= The Worst Person in the World (disambiguation) =

The Worst Person in the World is a 2021 Norwegian film, the third in Joachim Trier's Oslo trilogy.

The Worst Person in the World may also refer to:

- The Worst Person in the World, a 1979 children's book by James Stevenson, which was followed by several sequels
- "The Worst Person in the World", a character in sketches by the comedy duo Bob and Ray
  - "Worst Person in the World", a segment on Countdown with Keith Olbermann partly inspired by the above character
    - The Worst Person in the World (book), a 2006 book by Keith Olbermann based on the above segment

== See also ==
- "Heartbreaking: The Worst Person You Know Just Made a Great Point", a ClickHole satirical article
- Worst. Person. Ever., a Douglas Coupland novel
