= Olbermann (TV series) =

American sports talk show

- Starring: Keith Olbermann
- Country of origin: United States
- Original language: English
- No. of episodes: 434

Production
- Running time: 60 minutes (August 26, 2013- September 5, 2014) 30 minutes (September 8, 2014-July 24, 2015)
- Production company: ESPN

Original release
- Network: ESPN2
- Release: August 26, 2013 – July 24, 2015

Olbermann is a television sports talk show hosted by Keith Olbermann on the American cable network ESPN2. The show, broadcast live daily from Times Square Studios in New York City, premiered on August 26, 2013, and featured Olbermann offering commentary and analysis on issues in the sports world.

Olbermann was originally a sixty-minute nightly program, usually starting at 11:00 PM Eastern. For a brief period of time, specifically during the ESPN networks’ coverage of the Australian Open, the show temporarily aired at 6:00 PM in a thirty-minute format. During this period a repeat of the program aired on ESPNEWS at 2:00 AM.

In September 2014, Olbermann was moved from its nightly spot to a late afternoon time slot and began airing at 5:00 PM Eastern in a thirty-minute format. ESPNEWS added two additional repeat airings; the first aired at 6:30 p.m., the second one in the usual 2:00 a.m. slot, and the last at 5:00 a.m.

On July 10, 2015, two days after ESPN declined to renew his expiring contract, Olbermann announced on air that the series would be coming to an end on July 24. The announcement came after The Hollywood Reporter claimed that ESPN wanted Olbermann to tone down his critical commentary, but the network claimed the move was to cut costs related to Olbermann's salary and the use of the space at Times Square Studios, claims later confirmed by an aborted move of Mike & Mike to the same facility and releases of other network talent at the end of their contracts throughout 2015 and into 2016.

== Background ==
Olbermann marked the second tour of duty for Keith Olbermann with the ESPN organization, having served as a popular co-anchor (alongside Dan Patrick) of the main network's SportsCenter between 1992 and 1997; it's also Olbermann's second stint at ESPN's secondary network, ESPN2, where he briefly served as original anchor of the network's SportsNight in 1993–1994. In the decade before Olbermann's debut, Olbermann gained notice as an anchor/commentator on hard news and political discussion, serving as host of Countdown with Keith Olbermann, which aired on MSNBC and, briefly, Current TV.

Since Olbermann's return to the ESPN family was formally announced in July 2013, much mention had been made in media coverage of the anchor's abrasive off-screen demeanor and his acrimonious partings with several of his previous employers, including his 1997 departure from ESPN. Both Olbermann and ESPN executives had reported "no friction" between them in the run-up to Olbermann's debut (ESPN VP/Programming Jamie Horowitz has noted Olbermann's openness to ideas and suggestions for the program); the anchor himself has owned up to his tempestuous past and his efforts to rebuild bridges with his old colleagues. Olbermann had also indicated he is happy returning to covering sports on a regular basis, telling The New York Times, "If you cover politics for eight years without interruption like I did, you need a change."

== Format ==
The format rundown below was the format in use when the show was reduced to thirty minutes.

- Opening monologue: Olbermann opens the show speaking for approximately six minutes about a sports issue of the day. Some of these commentaries are along the lines of the "Special Comment" segments on Countdown where he criticizes a figure and demands action. Others are more lighthearted in nature such as his "Mr. Cranky" predictions. Another occasional feature on his monologs were musings on sports history, lore and his take on it.
- World's Worst: another Countdown feature adjusted for the sports audience, on people or organizations that have performed something egregious that sets them up for Olbermann's ridicule, and like Countdown, retains Bach's Toccata and Fugue in D Minor as background music. This segment is "more gentle and sarcastic" than its counterpart's sharp political tinge on Countdown; Olbermann pokes fun at "the miscreants, losers and riffraff, the unwashed and the unloved," suggesting that viewers "don't take it completely seriously, I don't mean it completely literally, we just call them 'The Worst Persons In the Sports World'." Occasionally though the 'completely' is dispensed with if the target's behavior was particularly egregious, along with the theme music for extended commentary. Three targets per night are featured, ranked "worse," "worser," and "worst" just as they were on Countdown. Also, as on Countdown, Olbermann tosses his notes at the camera following its conclusion (although he did this more on the Current TV series) and pretends to play the organ chord that closes the musical piece. Although the Worst segment is usually lighthearted in nature, Olbermann will occasionally use the segment to profile someone who did something so bad there is no other place to discuss them and will usually dispense with his end of segment theatrics by either throwing to break or by spinning his chair around so his back is facing the camera. Other times, for instance when Olbermann complimented model Chrissy Teigen on her Dodgers first pitch done while under the influence of alcohol, or ribbed his friend, Cleveland Indians manager Terry Francona, for a story about his over-consumption of ice pops, the "worst" ranking is done fully light-heartedly and disclaimed as the only place in the show's format where the story could fit in.
- X Joins KO: Olbermann conducts an interview with a featured guest, whether it be from the world of sports or entertainment. ESPN contributors Jason Whitlock, Buster Olney, and John Clayton were frequent guests as are ESPNW contributor Sarah Spain, who like Olbermann is a Cornell University graduate (which Olbermann routinely discusses during the show); Grantland and Baseball Tonight contributor Jonah Keri, MLB.com and former Houston Chronicle columnist Richard Justice, and comedian and writer Bill Scheft, who was Olbermann's designated emergency guest.
- The Bruno Bash: Every Friday, Olbermann and his former ESPN Radio colleague Tony Bruno would have a discussion focusing on various sports issues of the day, usually in a humorous fashion. The segment was temporarily on hiatus while Bruno focused on his return to daily sports radio hosting on WIP-FM in Philadelphia; he returned on April 2, 2015, with the segment done on Bruno's end most weeks via satellite from ABC O&O WPVI-TV in Philadelphia.
- Late Headlines/Keith Lights: The closing segment of every show. The segment leads off with Olbermann relaying some tidbits of sports news from earlier in the day, although some news breaks while the program is airing. These are followed by Olbermann commenting on sports highlights, usually from the previous day's action since the show's 5:00 PM airtime usually does not allow for current day highlights. As he recaps them Olbermann will rely on catchphrases he used during his SportsCenter days, such as saying a high-pitched "Hello!" for a collision between two players and "bye, Felicia" for plays that result in someone being dismissed or left behind (such as a strikeout or a fast break). Olbermann also lightheartedly mocks other sports announcers. For instance, for basketball highlights he will do an imitation of Johnny Most when a player makes a three-point shot. using accentuated, For baseball highlights, particularly those where home runs are featured, Olbermann puts a spin on the home run call of John Sterling where he follows the call with a series of three-syllable names, usually starting with Boba Fett. For golf highlights, Olbermann portrays course reporter "Bob Slurm" and speaks in a hushed tone like a stereotypical golf broadcaster would. A further running gag with the golf highlights involves Olbermann getting "caught" portraying Bob Slurm; since he uses the hushed tone, he has to hold his lapel mic close to his face so he can be heard and often the camera cuts away from the highlights while Olbermann is still in character. The voice is also used with Westminster Kennel Club Dog Show highlights in mid-February, and Olbermann interviews the trainer of the Best in Show dog the day after the show, as he did during the run of Countdown. Sometimes, if there are not any games to recap, the segment instead focuses on past highlights with the title "Keith Lights Throughout History".

Politics are not entirely off limits on Olbermann; rebuffing a report from The New York Times claiming that he was contractually forbidden from speaking about politics on the show, Olbermann said, "There’s nothing preventing me from doing it other than common sense," although he hinted that some aspects of politics would be covered if it crosses paths with the sports world.

The original sixty-minute format included all of the above segments, with the exception that there were two rounds of Keith Lights segments; the first recapped sports action to that point in the program and included the top sports news of the day while the second added any additional action that had been completed in the intervening time.

In October 2013 Olbermann adopted a more rigid format. The opening monolog and format rundown switched places, with Olbermann starting the show with the list of topics and introducing the program with "Olbermann is next, by the way, I'm Olbermann." In April 2014, the show again flipped the order of the monolog and the rundown so that the monolog returns to its cold open style and the rundown leads into the first commercial. For the show's finale, Olbermann, instead of opening with a monolog, explained "his crack staff did everything for me today so I don't have to work", which immediately led into first guest Kareem-Abdul Jabbar.

Olbermann would close the show in the following manner.

Alright, I've done all the damage I can do here. In New York, Keith Olbermann, ESPN; for (x), (x), and the entire Eyewitness News team, go forth and spread beauty and light.

Olbermann's signoff pays tribute to two people who influenced his life. After Chet Curtis, with whom Olbermann had worked at WCVB-TV in Boston when he was briefly the station's sportscaster in 1984, died in January 2014 Olbermann began adding the news close to his signoff and employed names of people featured earlier in the show (although he uses "news" and "Eyewitness News" interchangeably; oddly enough, Olbermann's time as a local sportscaster in Boston and Los Angeles did not see him work for any station using the Eyewitness News branding as WCVB brands its newscasts as NewsCenter, while KTLA had the NewsWatch branding and KCBS was using the Action News format while Olbermann was there).

Olbermann's signoff line is taken from Arthur Naething, an English teacher of Olbermann's at the Hackley School who used to say this to all of his students and who died in October 2014. Previously Olbermann signed off by using Edward R. Murrow's trademark "good night and good luck" signoff, which he had begun to use while at MSNBC, and had recently begun incorporating the phrase "hap'nin" in honor of his schoolmate Chris Berman. After signing off, Olbermann crumples what is left of his notes and tosses them at the camera, with the lens "shattering" for effect. In his final show on July 24, Olbermann, after a long montage of hilarity and quirks, thanked all of his directors, artists, and colleagues. He then signed off by saying "Bye, Felicia" one last time and threw his signed Abdul-Jabbar basketball toward the camera to close the series.

When Olbermann first made the move to 5:00 PM, it coincided with a move of Outside the Lines to follow it on the schedule and at the end of the show, Olbermann would toss to Bob Ley (or whoever happened to be hosting the show that day) in Bristol and briefly discuss the upcoming half-hour. The tosses were cut out of each subsequent reairing and dropped altogether when OTL moved back to ESPN

=== Former segments ===
- "This Week in Keith History" - an interlude that finds Olbermann providing amusing reactions to clips from his earlier ESPN stint that he has not seen in advance ("I haven't seen it, I don't know what it is, I didn't get a hint, and yes I did pay for that haircut"). This segment was only featured for the first two weeks of the show and has since been dropped.
- "Time Marches On" - originated as "Oddball" on Countdown and renamed to its current name when the show moved to Current, this segment saw Olbermann commenting on the "wild and wacky" stories in the world of sports with accompanying video clips. These segments were dropped when Olbermann was reduced to thirty minutes.

=== Guest hosts ===
Guest hosts have occasionally shown up on Olbermann for various reasons. These were initially done out of necessity due to Olbermann's previously announced commitment to anchor Turner Sports' coverage of the Major League Baseball postseason in October 2013. Larry King was the first substitute host, with Colin Cowherd and Jeremy Schaap following him. The format for these shows was largely scrapped, and Cowherd had his own segment at the end of the show where he ranked whether or not a sports figure was having a good day.

In early 2014, Olbermann suffered a bout of shingles and required some intermittent substitutes. The two most frequent were Adnan Virk and Pablo Torre, and in the former case (since Virk is a SportsCenter anchor) the "Keith Lights" segments returned. When Torre substituted the shows were more interview driven. In both cases, the program would often be reduced in length to thirty minutes.

Other guest hosts have included Robert Flores, Bram Weinstein, Max Bretos, Jay Harris, Matt Barrie, Ryen Russillo, and Steve Weissman.

==== Suspension ====
Olbermann was suspended on February 24, 2015, for a week after he made disparaging comments on Twitter regarding Penn State and Penn State IFC/Panhellenic Dance Marathon, which raises money for pediatric cancer. Adnan Virk and Pablo Torre hosted the show in his absence. Olbermann gave an apology for his Twitter comments on his first day back from suspension.

== International broadcasts ==
- Canada: Was initially carried on TSN2, normally at midnight ET, i.e. on a tape delay of about one hour. Receiving little promotion, the program was removed from the schedule at the start of October 2013. With the September 2014 move to an afternoon timeslot (combined with the launch of additional TSN channels), the program began airing simultaneously with U.S. broadcast most weekdays on one of the TSN channels, usually TSN2.
- Australia: Airs on ESPN Australia delayed to 11:00 PM EST.
