= The Resistance with Keith Olbermann =

Political web series

- Also known as: The Closer with Keith; Olbermann (2016)
- Genre: Political criticism
- Directed by: Dorenna Newton
- Creative director: Dorenna Newton
- Presented by: Keith Olbermann
- Country of origin: United States
- Original language: English
- No. of seasons: 2
- No. of episodes: 147

Original release
- Network: GQ
- Release: September 13, 2016 – November 27, 2017

The Resistance with Keith Olbermann (originally titled The Closer with Keith Olbermann) was a political web series hosted by Keith Olbermann for GQ. It premiered on September 13, 2016, and ended on November 27, 2017. Typically three new episodes were posted every week and centered around criticism of then United States presidential Candidate, and later President of the United States Donald Trump. They are stylistically similar to the Special Comments from Olbermann's previous work, Countdown with Keith Olbermann.

On November 27, 2017, Olbermann announced his retirement from political commentary after episode 147 had aired, citing his belief that "this . . . presidency of Donald John Trump will end prematurely and end soon, and I am thus also confident that this is the correct moment to end this series of commentaries".

== History ==
It premiered on September 13, 2016, as The Closer with Keith Olbermann. After Donald Trump won the 2016 U.S. presidential election, it was retitled The Resistance with Keith Olbermann.

Among the series' segments is one in which he criticized Rudy Giuliani for questioning Hillary Clinton's health, noting that Clinton did not question Giuliani's health when she was running for the Senate from New York, even though he previously had prostate cancer.

== Impact ==
As of March 2017, this series has nearly 170 million views on GQ's YouTube and Facebook.

As of October 23, 2016, the first episode of the series had been viewed more than 800,000 times on YouTube.

The web series also yielded a book adaption of the commentaries, "Trump is F*cking Crazy (This is not a joke)", announced in September 2017 and released in October 2017.
