= Drug-Free Century Act =

- Citation: S. 5 [106th]

Legislative history
- Bill citation: full text
- Introduced by: Sen. Michael DeWine [R-OH]
- First reading: January 19, 1999
- Committee report: Senate Judiciary

Keywords
- Also known as Drug-Free Families Act of 1999; International Crime Control Act of 1999; Money Laundering Deterrence Act of 1999

The Drug-Free Century Act was introduced to the United States Senate in January 1999. Its primary purpose was to reduce the transportation and distribution of illegal drugs and to reduce domestic demand. The bill failed to proceed beyond the first stage in the process of becoming a law. Among other provisions, it would have increased the criminal penalty for violence committed along the United States border, introduced stricter sanctions for obstructing a boarding by maritime law patrol, or providing false information.
