= Shannyn Moore =

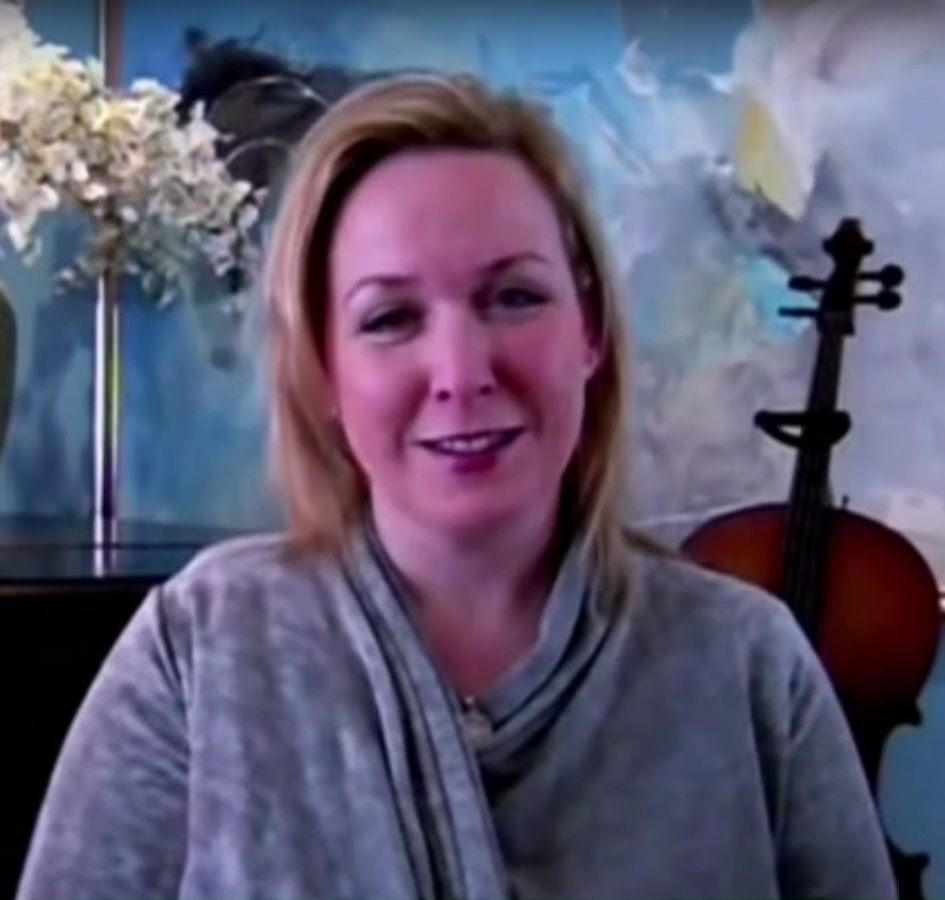
Shannyn Moore in 2012 on The Big Picture with Thom Hartmann.

Shannyn Moore (born June 12, 1970) is an American political blogger based in Alaska. Moore is a writer for The Huffington Post and has been a prominent critic of former Alaska governor Sarah Palin. She has appeared on such television shows as The Rachel Maddow Show and Countdown with Keith Olbermann. Moore also launched her own political talk show, Moore Up North, in November 2009.

After Sarah Palin announced her resignation as Governor of Alaska, Palin and her attorneys released a statement threatening legal action to those who "propagate defamatory material" about her. The statement added "To the extent several websites, most notably liberal Alaska blogger Shannyn Moore, are now claiming as 'fact' that Governor Palin resigned because she is 'under federal investigation' for embezzlement or other criminal wrongdoing, we will be exploring legal options this week to address such defamation", her attorney said. "This is to provide notice to Ms. Moore, and those who re-publish the defamation, such as Huffington Post, MSNBC, the New York Times and The Washington Post, that the Palins will not allow them to propagate defamatory material without answering to this in a court of law."

Moore responded in a press conference that Palin is "a coward and a bully" and that she never claimed the rumors were fact but only pointed out they existed.

== Radio ==
Shannyn Moore returned to radio station KUDO on January 18, 2010. She also guest hosted This Is America with Jon Elliott on Air America in December 2008. On December 11, 2010, KUDO went off the air after being sold by owner IBEW. On December 13, 2010, Shannyn Moore debuted her show on KOAN 1020, a Fox affiliate.

== Television ==
Shannyn Moore launched her television show "Moore Up North", an hour-long political talk show, on November 14, 2009 on KYES Channel 5.

== Print ==
Shannyn Moore is a contributor to the Alaska Dispatch News newspaper, based in Anchorage, Alaska.

== Awards ==
Shannyn Moore was awarded with the 2009 Steve Gilliard Journalism Grant at the Netroots Nation Conference on August 14, 2009. The award was due to her coverage of then vice presidential candidate and Alaska governor Sarah Palin on Moore's blog, Just a Girl from Homer.
