= 1992 United States Senate election in Ohio =

- November 3, 1992
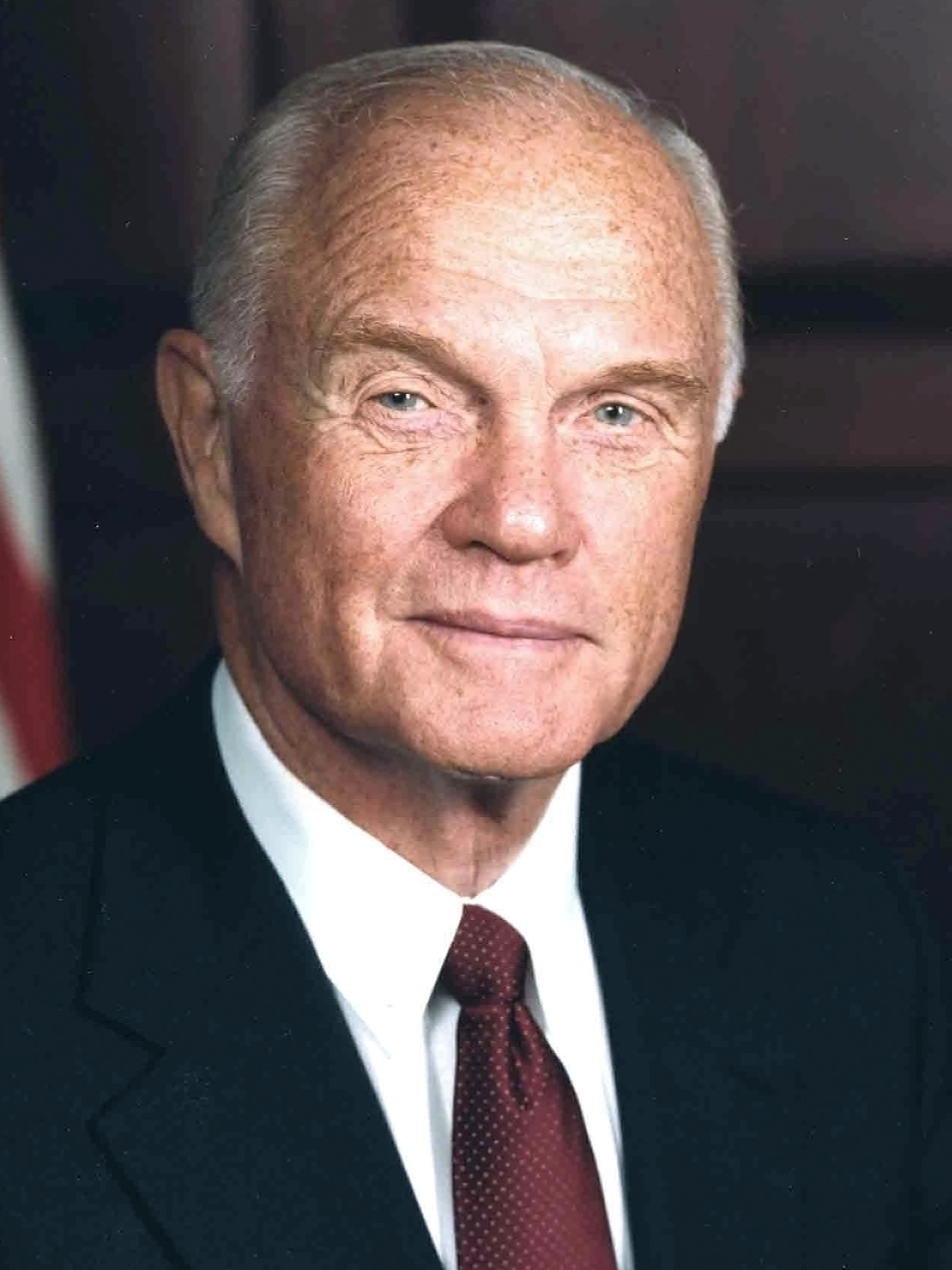

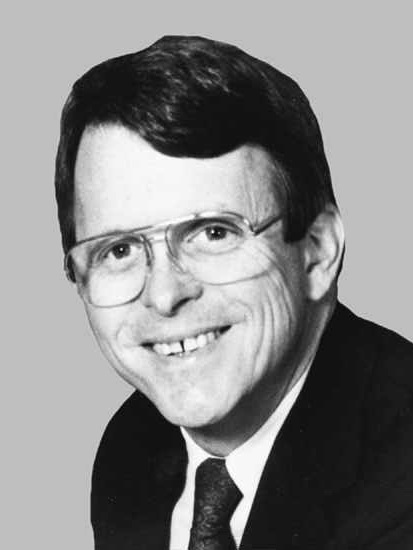

Nominee	John Glenn	Mike DeWine	Martha Grevatt
Party	Democratic	Republican	Workers World
Popular vote	2,444,419	2,028,300	321,234
Percentage	50.99%	42.31%	6.70%
- Glenn: 40–50% 50–60% 60–70% 70–80% 80–90% DeWine: 40–50% 50–60% 60–70% 70–80% 80–90% Grevatt: 40–50% Tie: 40–50%
U.S. senator before election
John Glenn
Democratic
Elected U.S. Senator
John Glenn
Democratic

The 1992 United States Senate election in Ohio was held on November 3, 1992. Incumbent Democratic U.S. Senator John Glenn defeated Republican Lieutenant Governor Mike DeWine to win re-election to a fourth term, coinciding with the presidential election.

Glenn's voting percentage of 51% represented the worst performance of his four runs for the Senate, partly due to the presence of third-party candidate Martha Grevatt of the far-left Workers World Party. DeWine would later be elected to Ohio's other Senate seat in 1994 and served with Glenn until the latter's retirement in 1999.

Until 2026, this was the last time the Democrats won the Class 3 Senate seat from Ohio when Sherrod Brown was elected through a special election. This is also the last time another Democrat other than Sherrod Brown won an Ohio Senate seat.

== General election ==
=== Candidates ===
- Mike DeWine, Lieutenant Governor of Ohio (Republican)
- John Glenn, incumbent U.S. Senator (Democratic)
- Martha Grevatt, activist and labor unionist (Workers' World)

=== Campaign ===
DeWine's campaign focused on the need for change and to introduce term limits for senators. If Glenn were to win, it would be his fourth consecutive term as senator, a feat that no Ohio senator had done before. DeWine was also critical of Glenn's campaign debts, mainly from Glenn's 1984 presidential campaign. His campaign used a bunny dressed as an astronaut beating a drum, with an announcer saying, "He just keeps owing and owing and owing", a play on the Energizer Bunny.

Glenn's campaign noted DeWine's anti-abortion leanings, and that he flip-flopped on his opposition of term limits. Glenn also said that DeWine was a career politician and was just looking for another job in politics. The extremely negative campaign caused a substantial number of voters to become disillusioned with both major-party candidates, leading to a large number of protest votes going to Martha Grevatt, nominee of the Marxist-Leninist Workers World Party, who was listed on the ballot as an independent.

=== Results ===
General election results
Party	Candidate	Votes	%
Democratic	John Glenn (incumbent)	2,444,419	50.99%
Republican	Mike DeWine	2,028,300	42.31%
Workers World	Martha Grevatt	321,234	6.70%
Majority		416,119	8.68%
Turnout		4,793,953	
Democratic hold			

== See also ==
- 1992 United States Senate elections
