= 1994 United States Senate election in Ohio =

- November 8, 1994
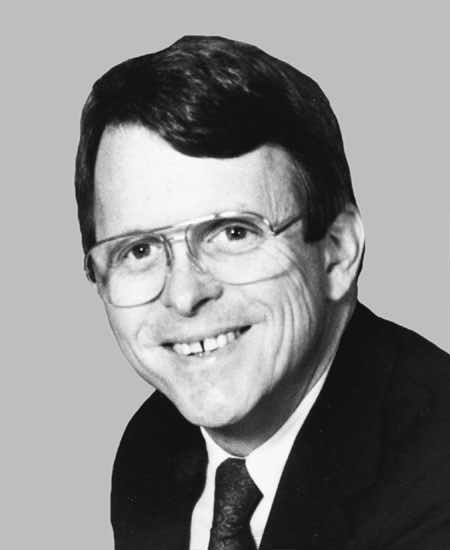

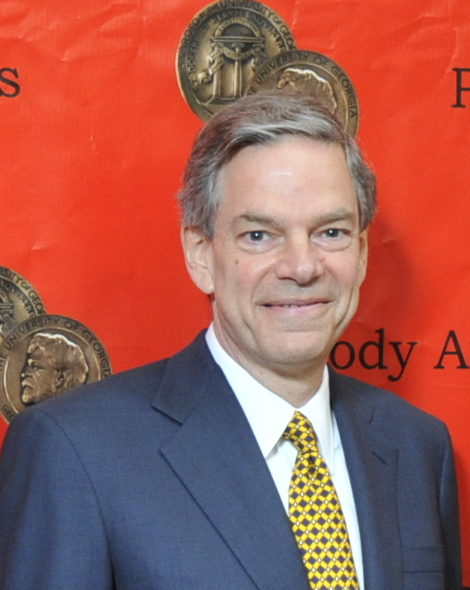

Nominee	Mike DeWine	Joel Hyatt	Joe Slovenec
Party	Republican	Democratic	Independent
Popular vote	1,836,556	1,348,213	252,031
Percentage	53.44%	39.23%	7.33%
- DeWine: 40–50% 50–60% 60–70% 70–80% 80–90% Hyatt: 40–50% 50–60% 60–70% 70–80% 80–90% Tie: 40–50% No votes
U.S. senator before election
Howard Metzenbaum
Democratic
Elected U.S. Senator
Mike DeWine
Republican

The 1994 United States Senate election in Ohio took place on November 8, 1994. Incumbent Democratic U.S. Senator Howard Metzenbaum decided to retire after 19 years in the United States Senate. Republican nominee Mike DeWine won the open seat against Democratic nominee Joel Hyatt, Metzenbaum's son-in-law. Independent candidate, conservative anti-abortion activist Joe Slovenec performed very well, getting over 7% of the vote. DeWine was the first Republican to win a U.S. Senate race in Ohio since 1970.

== Democratic primary ==
=== Candidates ===
- Ralph A. Applegate, Columbus businessman
- Mary O. Boyle, Cuyahoga County Commissioner and former State Representative from Cleveland Heights
- Joel Hyatt, attorney, businessman and son-in-law of incumbent U.S. Senator Howard Metzenbaum

=== Results ===
1994 Democratic U.S. Senate primary
Party	Candidate	Votes	%
Democratic	Joel Hyatt	432,361	46.25%
Democratic	Mary O. Boyle	415,853	44.48%
Democratic	Ralph A. Applegate	86,677	9.27%
Total votes		934,891	100.00%

== Republican primary ==
=== Candidates ===
- Mike DeWine, Lieutenant Governor and nominee in 1992
- Bernadine Healy, former Director of the National Institutes of Health
- George H. Rhodes, Mentor firefighter and aviation consultant
- Eugene J. Watts, State Senator from Columbus

=== Results ===
1994 Republican U.S. Senate primary
Party	Candidate	Votes	%
Republican	Mike DeWine	422,367	52.04%
Republican	Bernadine Healy	263,560	32.47%
Republican	Gene J. Watts	83,103	10.24%
Republican	George H. Rhodes	42,633	5.25%
Total votes		811,663	100.00%

== General election ==
=== Candidates ===
- Mike DeWine, Lieutenant Governor and nominee for Senate in 1992 (Republican)
- Joel Hyatt, businessman and son-in-law of incumbent U.S. Senator Howard Metzenbaum (Democratic)
- Joe Slovenec, anti-abortion activist (Independent)

=== Results ===
1994 U.S. Senate election in Ohio
Party	Candidate	Votes	%	±%
Republican	Mike DeWine	1,836,556	53.44%	+11.13%
Democratic	Joel Hyatt	1,348,213	39.23%	−17.74%
Independent	Joe Slovenec	252,031	7.33%	N/A
Majority		488,343	14.21%	−0.45%
Turnout		3,436,800		
Republican gain from Democratic				

== See also ==
- 1994 United States Senate elections
