= Derrick Pitts =

American astronomer

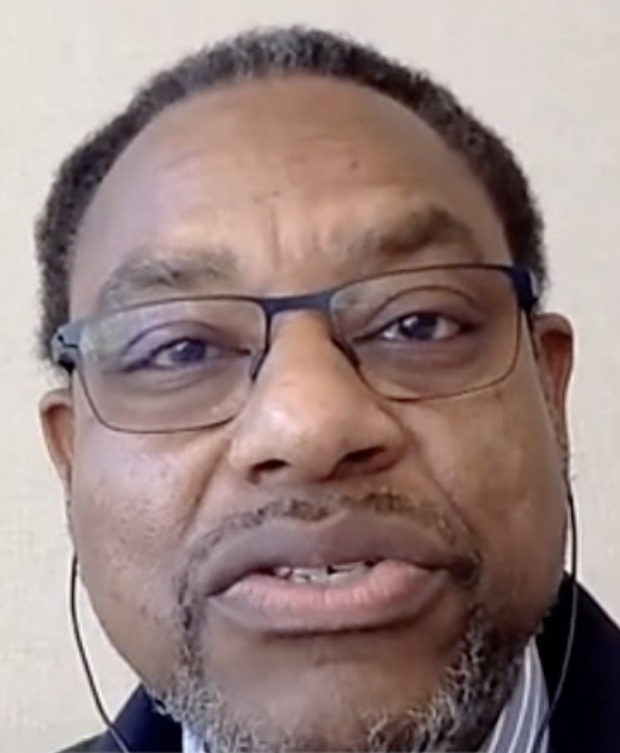
- Oct 2016
- Born: January 22, 1954 (age 72); Philadelphia, Pennsylvania
- Education: Germantown Academy St. Lawrence University
- Awards: Alumni Award
- Scientific career
- Fields: Astronomy, Science Communication
- Workplaces: Franklin Institute
- Website: fi.edu/en/authors/derrick-pitts-hond

Derrick Pitts (born January 22, 1955) is an American astronomer and science communicator. Pitts studied at St. Lawrence University and has been employed at the Franklin Institute since 1978 where he is chief astronomer and director of the institute's Fels Planetarium. Pitts is a frequent guest on radio and television to explain the science of astronomy and share his enthusiasm for science in general.

== Early life and education ==
Pitts was born in the Tioga-Nicetown section of Philadelphia on January 22, 1955. As a young child he was fascinated by space travel and astronomy. The power of science to determine reliable information about objects in space had a profound effect on him. He learned that by the careful examination of light many things could be learned even from very distant objects. This realization caused him to look "into the sky with a totally different understanding of it than I had just a few hours before". He attended Germantown Academy from 1969 to 1974 enrolling as its second African-American student.

Pitts attended St. Lawrence University, graduating in 1978 with a degree in geology.

== Franklin Institute ==
Pitts has been at the Franklin Institute since he was a college student. He is the institute's chief astronomer, show producer for the institute's Fels Planetarium, and primary public figure. His responsibilities include the design and presentation of exhibits and public programs. His goal is to create "content, exhibits, and programs that translate complex science topics to levels that can be understood by interested people of all ages".

== Views on science ==
Pitts says that "Science is really questioning what you see, therefore, the essence of science is looking. You have to look". It is Pitts's belief that science just can't be housed in a planetarium or museum; ubiquitous as gravity, it's everywhere. He often uses the slogan "Eat, breathe, do science. Sleep later".

== Media and public appearances ==
Pitts has made numerous television appearances, including shows such as The Colbert Report, The Late Late Show with Craig Ferguson, Countdown with Keith Olbermann, The Last Word with Lawrence O'Donnell, and The Ed Show. Since 1991, he's co-hosted a weekly radio discussion program called Skytalk on WHYY-FM in Philadelphia, PA. He narrated 2001: A Space Odyssey concert at the Mann Center for the Performing Arts to honor astronaut, and fellow Philadelphia local, Col. Guion Bluford Jr. Science advisor and host for PBS The Great Comet Crash, guest scientist for Newton's Apple, and science guy for Kid's corner. In January 2022 Pitts, along with actor and TikToker Kalpana Pot, began hosting a webseries for The Franklin Institute entitled "A Practical Guide to the Cosmos". The series explores "exoplanets, galaxies, black holes, and space missions" as well as how to spot celestial bodies, and astronomical phenomena in the night sky.

== Awards, memberships, and recognition ==
Pitts was named a NASA Solar System Ambassador, received honorary Doctor of Science degrees from La Salle University and Rowan University College of Mathematics and Science(Philadelphia, PA), the Mayor's Liberty Bell, the St. Lawrence University Distinguished Alumni Award, and the G. W. Carver Medal and Please Touch Museum's "Great Friend To Kids" Award. Pitts was inducted into the Germantown Historical Society Hall of Fame and selected as one of the "50 Most Important Blacks in Research Science" by Science Spectrum Magazine in 2004. He received the 2010 David Rittenhouse Award from LaSalle University in 2011. Pitts was a member of the Germantown Academy board of trustees.

== Personal life ==
Pitts is an a cappella singer. He sang barbershop quartet in high school and madrigal singing in college. As of 2020 he lived in Philadelphia with his wife, Linda.
