= Mike DeWine =

Governor of Ohio since 2019

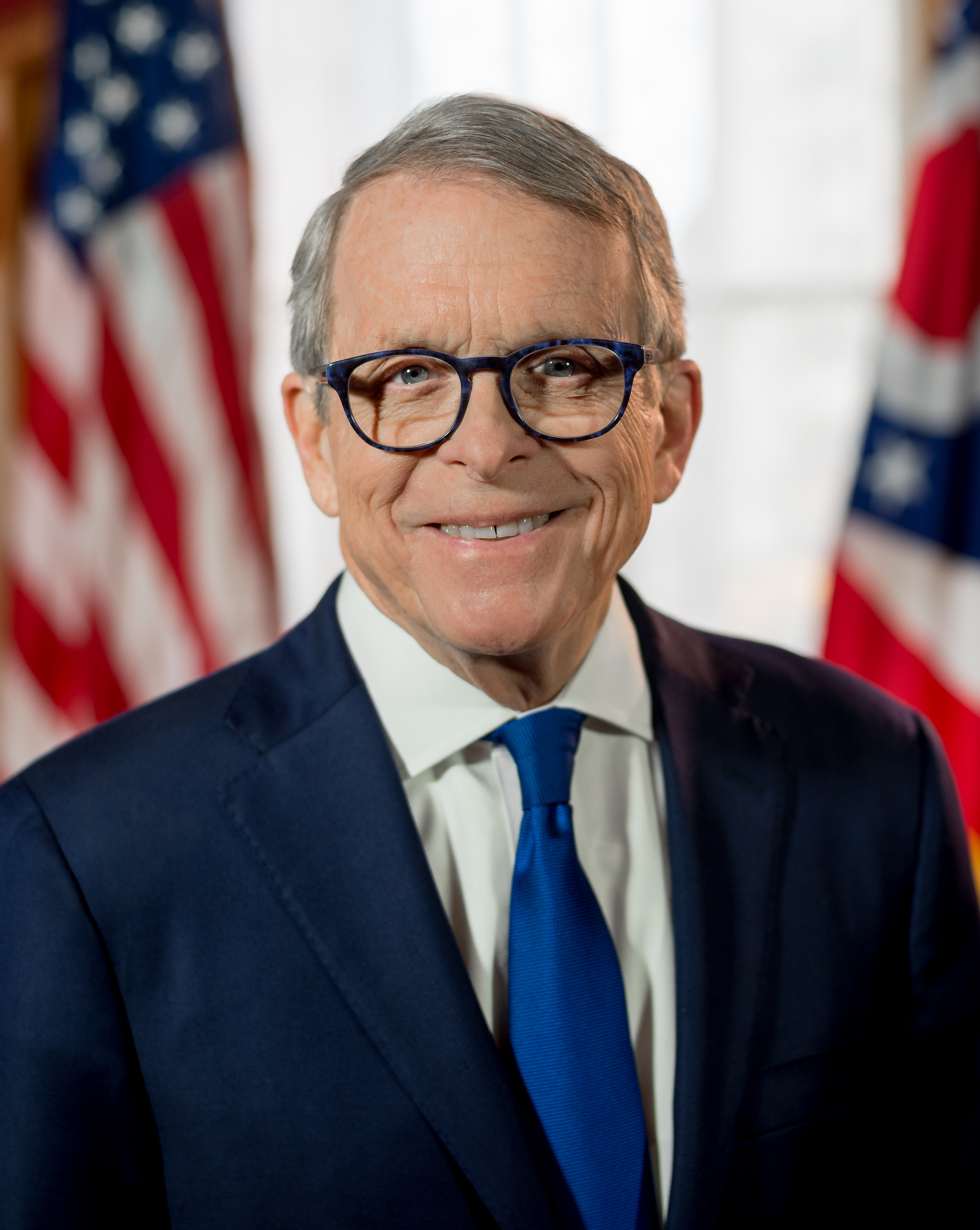
- Official portrait, 2018

70th Governor of Ohio
- Incumbent
- Assumed office January 14, 2019
- Lieutenant: Jon Husted; Jim Tressel
- Preceded by: John Kasich

50th Attorney General of Ohio
- In office January 10, 2011 – January 14, 2019
- Governor: John Kasich
- Preceded by: Richard Cordray
- Succeeded by: Dave Yost

United States Senator from Ohio
- In office January 3, 1995 – January 3, 2007
- Preceded by: Howard Metzenbaum
- Succeeded by: Sherrod Brown

59th Lieutenant Governor of Ohio
- In office January 14, 1991 – November 12, 1994
- Governor: George Voinovich
- Preceded by: Paul Leonard
- Succeeded by: Nancy Hollister

Member of the U.S. House of Representatives from Ohio's 7th district
- In office January 3, 1983 – January 3, 1991
- Preceded by: Bud Brown
- Succeeded by: Dave Hobson

Member of the Ohio Senate from the 10th district
- In office January 2, 1981 – December 13, 1982
- Preceded by: John Mahoney
- Succeeded by: Dave Hobson

Prosecutor of Greene County
- In office 1977–1981
- Preceded by: Nicholas Carrera
- Succeeded by: William Schenck

Personal details
- Born: Richard Michael DeWine; January 5, 1947 (age 79) Springfield, Ohio, U.S.
- Party: Republican
- Spouse: Frances Struewing (m. 1967)
- Children: 8, including Pat
- Relatives: Kevin DeWine (second cousin)
- Education: Miami University (BA); Ohio Northern University (JD)
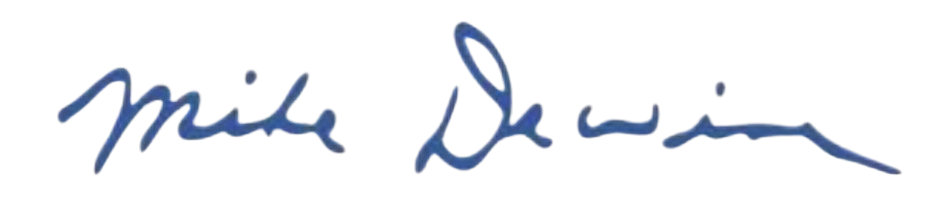
- Signature
- Website: Office website
- DeWine's voice DeWine supporting DR-CAFTA. Recorded June 30, 2005

Richard Michael DeWine (/dəˈwaɪn/ də-WYNE; born January 5, 1947) is an American politician and attorney serving as the 70th governor of Ohio since 2019. A member of the Republican Party, he served as the 50th attorney general of Ohio from 2011 to 2019, as a United States senator from Ohio from 1995 to 2007, and in the U.S. House of Representatives from 1983 to 1991.

A native of Yellow Springs, Ohio, DeWine graduated from Miami University in 1969 and Ohio Northern University College of Law in 1972. He was an assistant prosecutor in Greene County, Ohio, and served one term as county prosecutor from 1977 to 1981. He continued his political career in the Ohio Senate from 1981 to 1982, and then served four terms as a U.S. representative from 1983 until 1991. From 1991 to 1994, he served as the 59th lieutenant governor of Ohio, under Governor George Voinovich.

DeWine was elected to the U.S. Senate in a landslide during the 1994 Republican Revolution, and sat on the Senate Appropriations; Judiciary; Health, Education, Labor and Pensions (HELP); and Select Intelligence Committees. He was reelected in 2000 and defeated in 2006 by Democrat Sherrod Brown. DeWine returned to politics four years later as the 50th attorney general of Ohio. In that office, he challenged the Affordable Care Act and tackled the opioid epidemic. He was elected governor in 2018 and reelected in 2022.

During DeWine's tenure as governor, the 2019 Dayton shooting prompted him to urge the Ohio legislature to enact new gun control measures, such as expanding background checks and harsher penalties for those in possession of unregistered firearms. In early 2020, DeWine received national attention for his response to the COVID-19 pandemic in Ohio, ordering the closing of dine-in restaurant service and sporting events and delegating additional resources to elderly care facilities.

== Early life, education, and career ==
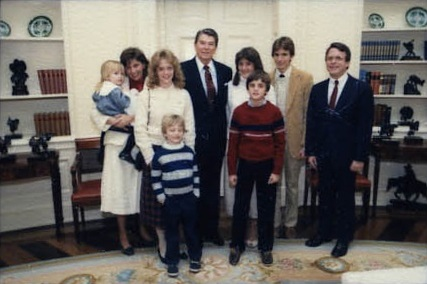
Congressman DeWine (far-right) and his family with President Ronald Reagan in 1985

DeWine was born in Springfield, Ohio, on January 5, 1947, and grew up in nearby Yellow Springs. He is the son of Jean Ruth (née Liddle) and Richard Lee DeWine. He was raised and identifies as a Catholic. DeWine earned a Bachelor of Science degree in education from Miami University in 1969 and a Juris Doctor from Ohio Northern University College of Law in 1972.

At age 25, DeWine started working as an assistant prosecuting attorney for Greene County, Ohio, and in 1976 he was elected county prosecutor, serving four years.

In 1980, DeWine was elected to the Ohio State Senate and served one two-year term.

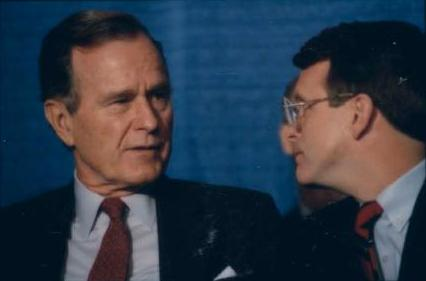
DeWine as U.S. representative with President George H. W. Bush in 1990

In 1982, U.S. representative Bud Brown of Ohio's 7th congressional district retired after 18 years in Congress; his father, Clarence Brown, Sr., had held the seat for 26 years before that. DeWine won the Republican nomination, assuring his election in November. He was reelected three more times from this district, which stretched from his home in Springfield to the Columbus suburbs. He ran unopposed in 1986 in what was regarded as a bad year for Republicans nationally.

In 1986, DeWine was one of the House impeachment managers who prosecuted the case in the impeachment trial of Judge Harry E. Claiborne. Claiborne was found guilty by the United States Senate and removed from his federal judgeship.

DeWine did not seek reelection to the House of Representatives in 1990, and briefly ran for governor, but withdrew before the primaries and instead ran for lieutenant governor as George Voinovich's running mate in that year's Ohio gubernatorial election. The Voinovich–DeWine ticket was easily elected.

== U.S. Senate (1995–2007) ==
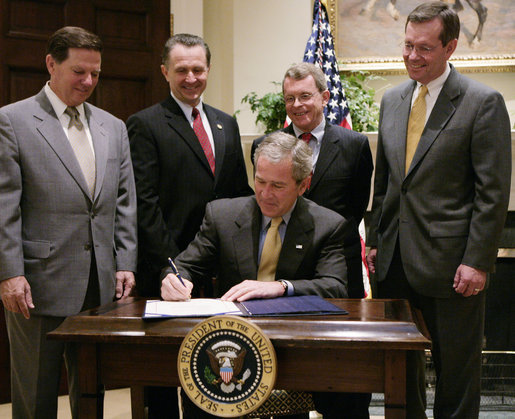
Senator DeWine (second from right) attending the signing of the Safe and Timely Interstate Placement of Foster Children Act by President George W. Bush in 2006

In 1992, DeWine unsuccessfully ran for United States Senate against former astronaut and three-term incumbent John Glenn. His campaign used the phrase "What on earth has John Glenn done?", echoing Jeff Bingaman's slogan "What on Earth has he done for you lately?" against former astronaut Harrison Schmitt in the 1982 United States Senate election in New Mexico.

In 1994, DeWine ran to succeed Senator Howard Metzenbaum, who was retiring. He defeated prominent attorney Joel Hyatt, Metzenbaum's son-in-law, by 14 percentage points. DeWine was reelected in 2000, defeating businessman Ted Celeste (former Ohio governor Dick Celeste's brother) by 24 percentage points.

DeWine sat at various points on the Senate Judiciary; Health, Education, Labor and Pensions (HELP); and Select Intelligence Committees, and was the first Ohio senator in nearly six decades to serve on the Appropriations Committee. He led the Joint House-Senate Intelligence Committee inquiry into U.S. intelligence failures before and after the September 11 attacks.

DeWine also co-chaired the Senate Great Lakes Task Force; the Senate Caucus on Missing, Exploited, and Runaway Children; and the Senate Global AIDS Crisis Working Group; and was a member of the Senate Drug Task Force. He was the initial sponsor of the Drug-Free Century Act in 1999 and was a member of the Gang of 14, a bipartisan group of senators that in 2005 made a compromise on judicial nominees. He voted in favor of the Authorization for Use of Military Force Against Iraq Resolution of 2002, authorizing the use of force against Saddam Hussein.

In 2006, DeWine ran for a third term and lost to Congressman Sherrod Brown by over 12 points. Before the election, DeWine's approval rating stood at 38%, making him the second-most unpopular senator in the country behind Rick Santorum of Pennsylvania, who also lost reelection that year. He received 905,644 fewer votes in 2006 than in 2000.

After leaving the Senate, DeWine accepted positions teaching government courses at Cedarville University, Ohio Northern University, and Miami University. In 2007, he joined the law firm Keating Muething & Klekamp as corporate investigations group co-chair. He also advised the John McCain 2008 presidential campaign in Ohio.

== Attorney General of Ohio (2011–2019) ==
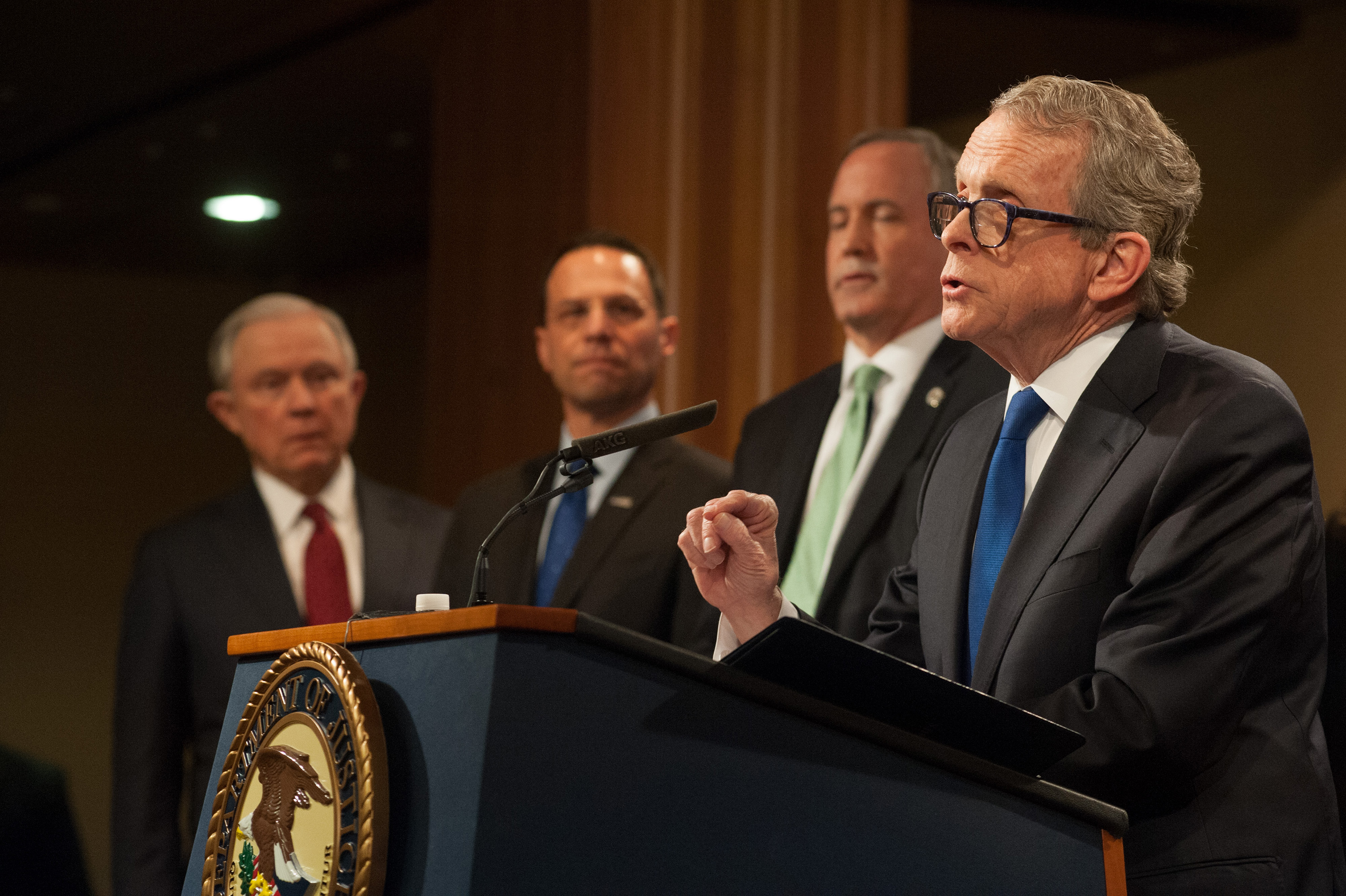
DeWine delivers remarks at the Department of Justice in 2018

On July 21, 2009, DeWine announced his candidacy for Ohio attorney general in the upcoming 2010 election. He defeated Democratic incumbent Richard Cordray, 48% to 46%. DeWine was reelected in 2014, defeating challenger David A. Pepper. He carried 83 of Ohio's 88 counties. DeWine's stated goal as attorney general was "protecting Ohio families".

In the 2012 Republican presidential primary, DeWine first endorsed Tim Pawlenty, then endorsed Mitt Romney after Pawlenty dropped out of the race. On February 17, 2012, DeWine announced he was retracting his endorsement of Romney and endorsed former senate colleague Rick Santorum. DeWine said, "To be elected president, you have to do more than tear down your opponents. You have to give the American people a reason to vote for you, a reason to hope, a reason to believe that under your leadership, America will be better. Rick Santorum has done that. Sadly, Governor Romney has not."

In 2015, DeWine filed a federal lawsuit against a part of the Affordable Care Act (ACA). In the suit, he alleged that the ACA's Transitional Reinsurance Program (which imposed a fee "paid by all employers who provide group health insurance in the workplace", which in 2014 was $63 per covered person and in 2015 was $44 per covered person) was unconstitutional as applied to state and local governments. When he filed the suit, DeWine claimed that the fee was "an unprecedented attempt to destroy the balance of authority between the federal government and the states". In January 2016, the federal court dismissed DeWine's suit, with U.S. district judge Algenon L. Marbley holding that the Transitional Reinsurance Program did not violate the Constitution. DeWine appealed, but the U.S. Court of Appeals for the Sixth Circuit affirmed Marbley's dismissal.

As attorney general, DeWine prioritized reducing DNA testing turnaround times at the Ohio Bureau of Criminal Investigation, cutting processing times for major criminal investigations from several months to less than one month. He also launched a statewide initiative to test nearly 14,000 previously untested rape kits, leading to thousands of DNA matches in the Combined DNA Index System and hundreds of indictments. DeWine created the Crimes Against Children Initiative, which combined investigators and prosecutors to pursue child exploitation and abuse cases, and supported task forces targeting human trafficking.

DeWine sent drugstore chains letters encouraging them to discontinue the sale of tobacco products. He targeted prescription drug "pill mills" in Ohio that fueled the opioid epidemic and pursued disciplinary action against doctors and pharmacists accused of improper prescribing practices. In 2013, he established a Heroin Unit to coordinate law enforcement and outreach efforts statewide. In 2017, he announced a broad anti-opioid strategy focused on enforcement, treatment, and prevention. DeWine also sued opioid manufacturers and distributors over their alleged role in the crisis.

In 2018, DeWine sued Major League Soccer and Columbus Crew SC owner Anthony Precourt after Precourt explored moving the team out of the state. After the Cleveland Browns moved to Baltimore in the late 1990s, the Ohio General Assembly passed a law requiring professional sports teams that had accepted taxpayer assistance to provide an opportunity for local owners to buy the teams before initiating a move. Later that year, an investor group led by Dee Haslam and Jimmy Haslam, owners of the Cleveland Browns, and the Edwards family reached an agreement to keep the Crew in Columbus.

== Governor of Ohio (2019–present) ==
=== Elections ===
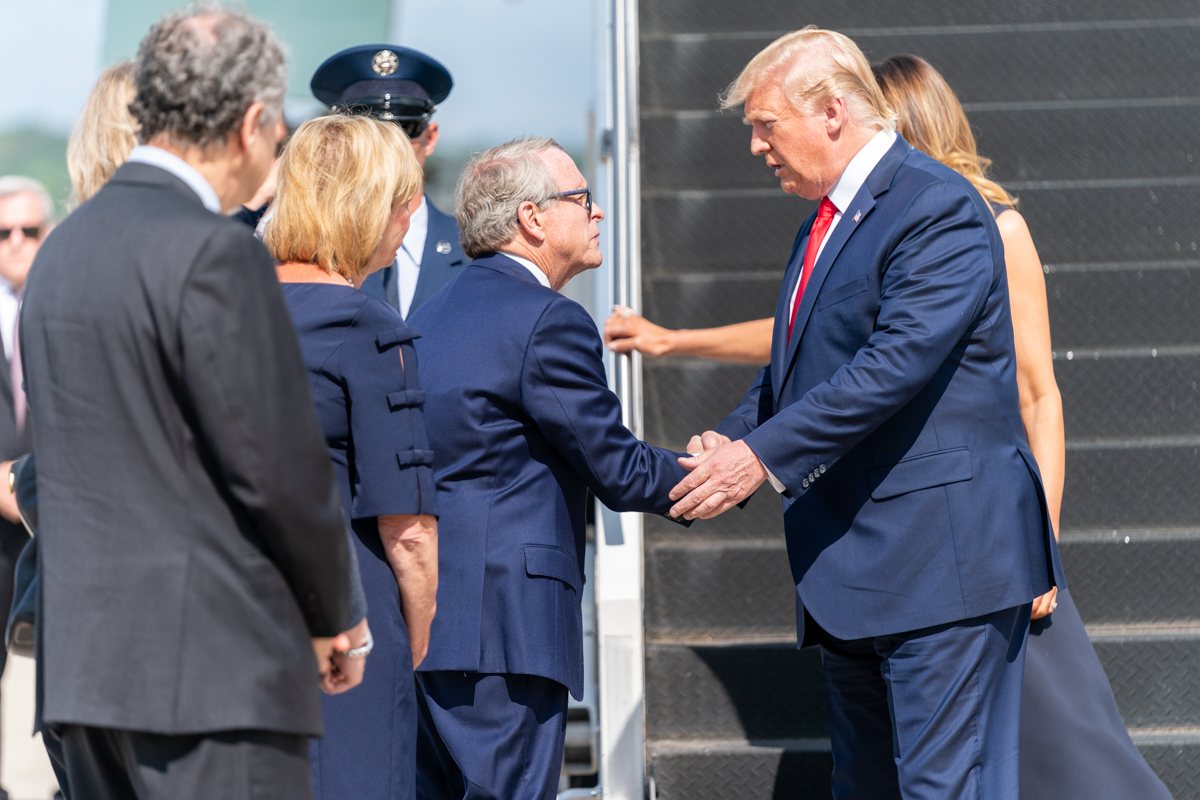
DeWine greeting President Donald Trump in 2019

DeWine announced his candidacy for governor on May 26, 2016, becoming the first major Republican to enter the race to succeed term-limited incumbent John Kasich. He launched his campaign at his annual ice-cream social in Cedarville, Ohio, on June 25, 2017. On December 1, 2017, DeWine selected Ohio secretary of state Jon Husted, who had initially run for governor, as his running mate for lieutenant governor. The move unified much of the state Republican establishment behind the ticket.

In the Republican primary on May 8, 2018, DeWine defeated incumbent Lieutenant Governor Mary Taylor, 59.8% to 40.2%. He faced Democratic nominee and former Consumer Financial Protection Bureau director Richard Cordray in the November 6 general election, a rematch of their 2010 attorney general race. DeWine defeated Cordray, 50.4% to 46.7%, a difference of about 166,000 votes. DeWine was inaugurated as Ohio's 70th governor on January 14, 2019, alongside Lieutenant Governor Husted.

Eligible for a second term, DeWine was challenged for the 2022 Republican nomination due to backlash against his strict COVID-19 restrictions. He defeated former Congressman Jim Renacci and farmer Joe Blystone in the primary, and defeated the Democratic nominee, Dayton mayor Nan Whaley, with 62.4% of the vote.

=== Tenure ===
DeWine's governorship has been characterized by a pragmatic, sometimes bipartisan approach that has occasionally put him at odds with the Ohio Republican Party's more conservative wing. Themes have included public-health preparedness, economic recovery after COVID-19, major infrastructure investment, children's issues (especially foster care and lead poisoning), environmental initiatives like the H2Ohio water-quality program, opioid and human trafficking prevention, education reform, workforce development, and a cautious approach to social issues.

==== First term (2019–2023) ====
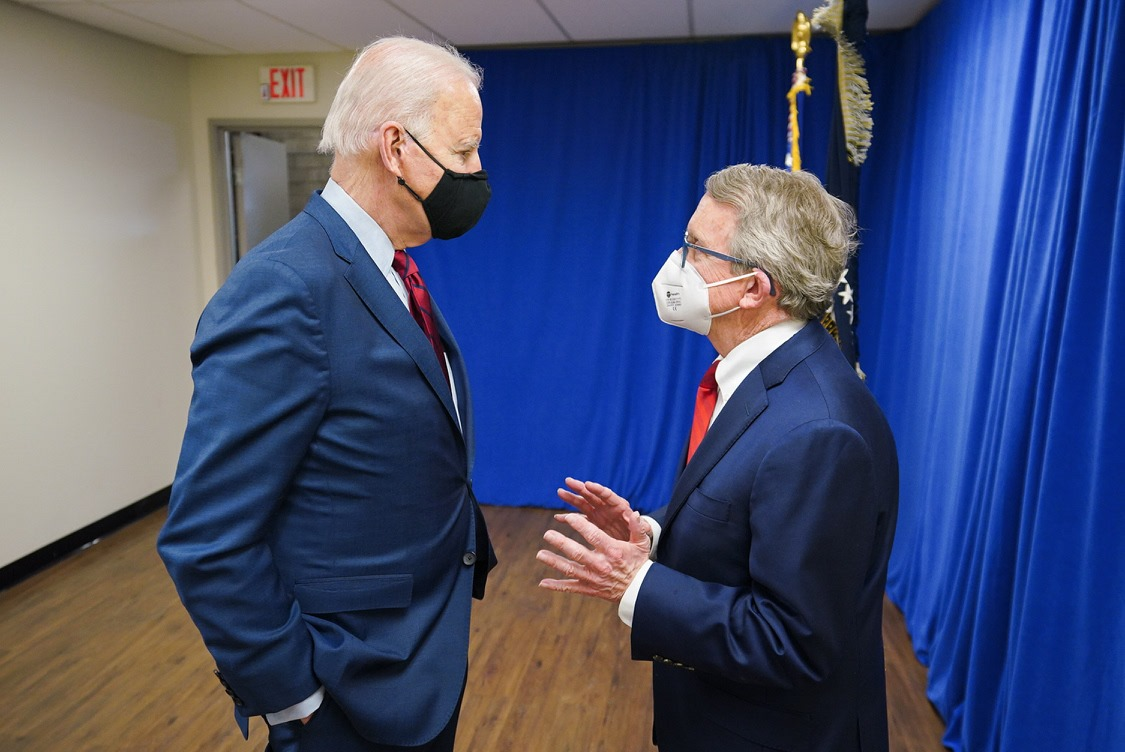
Governor DeWine discussing the COVID-19 response with President Joe Biden in 2021

DeWine was inaugurated on January 14, 2019. On his first day in office, he signed six executive orders establishing priorities: the Governor's Children's Initiative (foster care and infant mortality), disability inclusion, mental health prevention, anti-discrimination in state employment (including LGBTQ protections), and the RecoveryOhio Initiative to combat the opioid crisis through prevention, treatment, and recovery. In February, President Donald Trump appointed DeWine to the bipartisan Council of Governors. In March, DeWine delivered his first State of the State address, proposing a gas tax increase for infrastructure and investments in children's services, mental health, and water quality.

In April 2019, DeWine signed the Heartbeat Bill, prohibiting abortions after a fetal heartbeat is detected. In July, he signed the biennial budget (gas tax increase, school choice expansion) and House Bill 6, a controversial energy bill subsidizing nuclear and coal plants, later linked to a major bribery scandal involving FirstEnergy. In August, after the Dayton mass shooting, DeWine proposed a 17-point gun safety plan including red-flag laws. In November, he launched H2Ohio for water quality improvement. In December, he supported local plastic bag bans and lead exposure initiatives.

DeWine's early, aggressive response to the COVID-19 pandemic drew national praise and backlash. In January and February 2020, DeWine began monitoring emerging cases. In March, he limited the Arnold Sports Festival, banned large gatherings, closed schools statewide, closed dine-in services, postponed a primary election, and issued a stay-at-home order. Gradual reopening began in May, as DeWine had daily briefings with Ohio Department of Health Director Amy Acton, who resigned in June amid threats. In July, DeWine imposed a statewide mask mandate and briefly banned hydroxychloroquine for COVID treatment before reversing the ban. In May 2021, DeWine's "Vax-a-Million" lottery boosted COVID vaccination uptake. In July, he signed a biennial budget with broadband, Appalachian, and water investments. Also in 2021, he signed criminal justice reforms, including ending cash bail for misdemeanors.

In 2022, DeWine signed a stand-your-ground law. Redistricting was contentious: multiple maps were struck down for gerrymandering, and DeWine supported gerrymandered maps despite criticism. In January 2022, Intel announced a major semiconductor campus. DeWine awarded grants for human trafficking prevention and survivor services.

==== Second term (2023–present) ====
On inauguration day 2023, DeWine signed executive orders including anti-discrimination and skills-based hiring. In February, a Norfolk Southern train derailed in East Palestine; DeWine activated the National Guard and supported rail safety. Also in 2023, DeWine signed the "Backpack Bill" expanding vouchers. In December, he vetoed House Bill 68, which prohibited gender-affirming care for minors; his veto was overridden in January 2024.

DeWine issued executive orders banning gender-affirming surgery for minors and restricting care. In 2024, ground was broken on the Intel campus and H2Ohio expanded. Amid an influx of Haitian migrants, DeWine deployed state troopers and funding to Springfield.

In 2025, DeWine formed the Property Tax Working Group and issued an executive order that state employees return to work in person. In July, he signed a $60 billion budget. In August, he deployed the National Guard to Washington, D.C. In December, he announced $65.6 million for Welcome Home Ohio housing. In January 2026, he announced that he intended to make a statement on the death penalty, on which Ohio has had a de facto moratorium since 2019, but he has not yet done so. In April 2026, DeWine announced he would make an official statement about his personal feelings about the death penalty during the week after Ohio's gubernatorial primaries, which took place on May 5.

== Political positions ==
=== Abortion ===
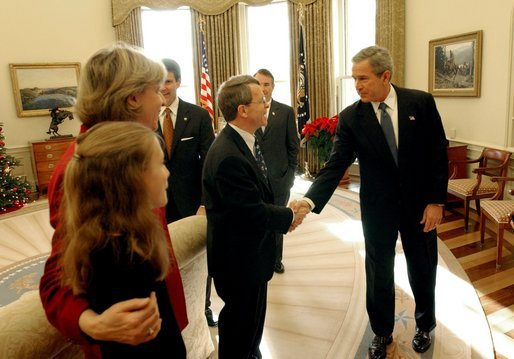
President George W. Bush congratulates Senator Mike DeWine on the passing of the Pediatric Equity Research Act of 2003

In April 2019, DeWine signed House Bill 493, known as the Ohio "Heartbeat Bill", into law, prohibiting abortion after a heartbeat is detected in a fetus, with no exceptions for cases of rape and incest, imposing one of the nation's most extensive abortion restrictions. DeWine opposes abortion. In the Senate, he was the lead sponsor of the Unborn Victims of Violence Act and voted for the Partial Birth Abortion Ban Act in 2003. In December 2020, DeWine signed a bill that said "fetal remains from surgical abortions in Ohio must be cremated or buried"; failure to do so would be a misdemeanor of the first degree.

November 2023 Ohio Issue 1 overturned Ohio's abortion ban.

=== Capital punishment ===
A leader of Ohio's ACLU chapter, which opposes capital punishment, has called the death penalty "a legacy issue" for DeWine. As a state senator in the 1980s, DeWine helped write the legislation that reinstated Ohio's death penalty following a nationwide moratorium. Although Catholic, DeWine did not join the Pope and Catholic bishops in openly opposing the death penalty; as governor, he avoided stating his views on the capital punishment for most of his tenure. In late May 2026, DeWine endorsed Republican gubernatorial candidate Vivek Ramaswamy; Ramaswamy supports capital punishment "only in the most egregious cases," while his opponent, Democratic gubernatorial candidate Amy Acton, said she would continue DeWine's moratorium on capital punishment.

On June 16, 2026, DeWine voiced support for abolishing the death penalty in Ohio; this stance differs from that of most other Republicans. It also differs from DeWine's previous stance on the death penalty, as he was once a proponent of capital punishment. In a statement on June 16, 2026, DeWine said he no longer believes the death penalty serves as a deterrent to murder and that the "moral justification I had for voting for the death penalty simply no longer exists". He discussed the harmful effect the decades-long delays in administering the death penalty had on murder victims' families, as well as the harmful psychological effects prison workers experienced from participating in executions, particularly botched ones. He called on state legislators to abolish the death penalty and also noted that voters had the power to amend the state constitution with ballot measures. Several Ohio lawmakers and candidates reacted to DeWine's proposal to end the death penalty in Ohio, with Ramaswamy and Ohio Attorney General candidate Keith Faber expressing their opposition with DeWine's abolitionist stance. Several other politicians and figures, including some Republicans, Ohio's former DRC director, and Democratic state senator Nickie Antonio, expressed their support of DeWine's stance and acknowledged the evolution his position had undergone over the years.

No executions have been conducted in Ohio since DeWine took office, and he stated he had delayed all executions due to "ongoing problems involving the willingness of pharmaceutical suppliers to provide drugs to the Ohio Department of Rehabilitation and Correction (DRC)"; before he announced his opposition to capital punishment, he said he was postponing executions in the interest of ensuring non-condemned Ohioans can use state-run programs to access the same drugs as those in Ohio's lethal injection cocktail. DeWine proposed that if his successors want to reinstate Ohio's death penalty, they should consider passing a "shield law" to keep pharmaceutical suppliers from finding out that the DRC used their drugs for executions. Every time an execution date has been scheduled during DeWine's tenure as governor, he has granted executive clemency postponing it for several years. Ohio has thus had a de facto death penalty moratorium since 2019.

In 2020, a reporter asked DeWine a question that implied DeWine was a death penalty proponent, and DeWine responded, "I didn't say that. I said I am following the law in Ohio [regarding capital punishment]." In the same answer, he implied that he disagreed with the common moral justification for capital punishment that it serves as a deterrent, considering that it takes decades for Ohio death row inmates to complete their appeals. DeWine also proposed that lawmakers legalize other methods of execution, but declined to offer suggestions. He said the death penalty was not a priority for the state, adding, "We're not going to execute anyone under the status quo." In December 2024, DeWine told a crowd of reporters, "We've not had any executions since I've been governor. We will not as long as I'm governor."

In late 2025, DeWine announced that he would use part of his final State of the State address to give his personal position on capital punishment; he said he would write his statement over Christmas and would have something to say the next month. But in January 2026, a spokesman said that DeWine had "no new public statements beyond his previous comments." Reporters previously speculated that DeWine would use the address to announce that he did not support the death penalty. His March 2026 State of the State address did not mention the subject. In a May 2026 forum discussing his endorsement of Ramaswamy and other issues, DeWine said he found the response to his upcoming statement overblown, but also confirmed he would deliver his remarks soon: "I don't want to build this up because I'm going to do it shortly, and I think there's been a lot of hype about this, but there really shouldn't be. It'll simply be Mike DeWine reflecting on the death penalty."

In 2025 and 2026, fellow Republican lawmakers in Ohio, including Attorney General Dave Yost and House Speaker Matt Huffman, expressed concern that DeWine might commute all death sentences before he leaves office in 2027. Yost and Huffman also confirmed that the predominantly Republican Ohio state legislature largely supports the death penalty and would not cooperate with any legislative efforts to abolish it. In his June 2026 statement announcing his opposition to the death penalty, DeWine noted that he and Huffman had discussed their opposing stances on the issue. Meanwhile, death penalty abolitionists have said they want DeWine to commute all the state's death sentences to life without parole, which would allow him to circumvent legislative resistance to ending capital punishment. In December 2019, DeWine said he believed the future of capital punishment should be up to citizen voters and legislators. Death penalty supporters have criticized DeWine's moratorium as expensive to uphold and denying closure to victims' families, while death penalty opponents have encouraged DeWine to abolish capital punishment due to racial discrimination, innocence cases, and geographical arbitrariness. As of 2026, there are over 108 inmates on Ohio's death row, many of whom have received reprieves from DeWine. DeWine has not said whether he will commute all active death sentences before leaving office.

=== Gerrymandering ===
In 2021, DeWine signed a redistricting map that favored Republicans. The map gave Republicans an advantage in 12 out of 15 districts, leaving two safely Democratic districts and one toss-up district. The map passed the Ohio legislature without any support from Democrats. Voting rights advocates called on DeWine to veto the pro-Republican redistricting map. In 2018, Ohio voted in a referendum for anti-gerrymandering reform that encouraged bipartisan support for redistricting maps. The same year, DeWine pledged to honor the voters' wishes and support a redistricting process conducted in a bipartisan way, but in 2021 he approved the changes for 2022 onward.

=== Gun control ===
Ohio governor Mike DeWine leaves the stage after speaking, and the crowd shouts "Do something!" in reaction to the 2019 Dayton shooting

In Congress, DeWine was known for his support for gun control measures. In 2004, he cosponsored an amendment to renew the Federal Assault Weapons Ban. He has repeatedly received an "F" rating from the National Rifle Association. The National Rifle Association endorsed him for governor. DeWine was one of only two Republican senators to vote against the Protection of Lawful Commerce in Arms Act, which banned lawsuits against gun manufacturers, distributors and dealers for criminal misuse of their products. In the 2006 election cycle, DeWine was the first senatorial candidate to be endorsed by the Brady Campaign to Prevent Gun Violence; he displayed the endorsement on his campaign webpage. In 2019, DeWine proposed a red flag law for Ohio that would allow courts to take guns from people seen as a threats to others or themselves. In January 2021, he signed into law a bill that removed the requirement to attempt to retreat before shooting in self-defense, and in March 2022 he signed a bill into law removing the requirement to possess a license to carry a concealed handgun in public.

=== Highway safety ===
As U.S. senator, DeWine joined a bipartisan effort to lower the national maximum blood-alcohol limit from .1% to .08% and to require reporting of vehicle-related deaths on private property like parking lots and driveways. He sponsored legislation on determining when aging tires become unsafe.

=== LGBTQ+ rights ===
DeWine opposes same-sex marriage and as a U.S. senator voted for the Defense of Marriage Act, which bars federal recognition of same-sex marriage and allows states to refuse to recognize such marriages performed in other states, and sponsored the Federal Marriage Amendment to the U.S. Constitution, which would have banned same-sex marriage. He argued in the Supreme Court in favor of bans on same-sex marriage, saying that such bans infringe on "no fundamental right" and that states should not have to recognize same-sex couples who married in other states. DeWine was the attorney general against Jim Obergefell in the case Obergefell v. Hodges. The Supreme Court issued a landmark ruling against DeWine and other defendants, finding same-sex marriage bans unconstitutional.

In 2021, DeWine opposed a bill that would have banned transgender athletes from playing on sports teams that do not match their sex at birth, saying, "This issue is best addressed outside of government, through individual sports leagues and athletic associations, including the Ohio High School Athletic Association, who can tailor policies to meet the needs of their member athletes and member institutions." In December 2023, he vetoed a bill that would have banned minors from receiving gender-affirming care in Ohio and transgender youth from playing on sports teams that did not match their sex assigned at birth. He said that if the bill became law, "Ohio would be saying that the state—that the government knows better what is medically best for a child than the two people who love that child the most, their parents." In January 2024, the Republican-dominated legislature overrode DeWine's veto of the gender-affirming care ban. Also in January 2024, DeWine signed an executive order that restricted gender-affirming surgery for youth while also proposing new administrative rules focused on transgender youth and adults. In February 2024, after backlash from trans people and healthcare providers, DeWine's administration dropped all the proposed rules to restrict treatment for transgender adults. In November 2024, DeWine signed into law a bill prohibiting students in public schools from using restrooms other than those for the gender they were assigned at birth.

=== Marijuana ===
In 2019, DeWine said: "it would really be a mistake for Ohio, by legislation, to say that marijuana for adults is just OK." In February 2020, NORML, a group advocating the legalization of marijuana, gave DeWine an "F" rating in relation to his policies. He opposed 2023 Ohio Issue 2, the "Regulate Marijuana Like Alcohol initiative". In 2024, DeWine requested lawmakers take action against Delta 8.

=== Hamas–Israel war campus protests ===
After the April 25, 2024, Ohio State University Gaza Solidarity Encampment resulted in at least 36 arrests of pro-Palestinian demonstrators, including 16 Ohio State University students, DeWine said, "I think that Ohio State did well", "what we don't want is any kind of hate", and that he opposes protests "right outside the door of a classroom". The demonstrators at the encampment were on the South Oval, which is not in the vicinity of any classrooms. DeWine also said he supported the arrests at Ohio State in the form of Ohio State Highway Patrol, which included an officer who aimed a rifle at protesters during the encampment's dispersal. He said that he supports Ohio and the U.S. "backing the country of Israel". In the same interview, he expressed support for Ohio Revised Code Section 9.76, which legally prohibits Ohio State from boycotting or divesting from companies on the basis of their support for Israel.

=== Other ===
In 2020, DeWine signed a bill that forbids colleges and universities in Ohio blocking controversial speakers. The same year, DeWine's compensation was 17th among state governors, at $159,189, compared to a maximum of $225,000 for the governor of New York and a minimum of $70,000 for the governor of Maine. The Ohio Checkbook shows that 92 employees of the Ohio state teachers retirement system, including director William Neville, equal or exceed the governor's salary.

=== Illegal immigration and immigration reform ===
In an August 10, 2026, opinion article published in The New York Times, DeWine advocated for immigration reform that combines stricter enforcement against illegal immigration with expanded legal immigration. According to DeWine, President Trump is in a unique position to pursue such reform because of his strong stance on border security. DeWine argued that the US needs immigrants to address an aging population, labor shortages, and the demand for skilled workers in strategic sectors. He proposed measures such as making it easier for qualified foreign students to remain in the country, reforming visas for skilled workers, and maintaining protections for immigrants facing humanitarian crises. DeWine wrote that securing the borders while expanding legal immigration could strengthen the US economy, its workforce, and its long-term competitiveness.

== Personal life ==
DeWine lives in the Whitelaw Reid House. He married Frances Struewing on June 3, 1967, and they have had eight children together. Their daughter Rebecca died at the age of 22 on August 4, 1993, in a car accident. One of their sons, Pat DeWine, is an Ohio Supreme Court Justice. Another son, Brian, is the president of the Minor League Baseball team the Asheville Tourists; the DeWine family purchased the team in 2010. DeWine's second cousin, Kevin DeWine, is the former Ohio Republican Party chairman.

== Electoral history ==
1982 Ohio seventh congressional district Republican primary
Party	Candidate	Votes	%	±%
Republican	Mike DeWine	32,615	69.03%	
Republican	Peter M. Knowlton	6,534	13.83%	
Republican	John F. Evans	4,223	8.94%	
Republican	Lynn Hokenson	1,572	3.33%	
Republican	Joseph J. Walker	1,476	3.12%	
Republican	Karl F. Hilt	830	1.76%	
Total votes		47,250	100.00%	

1982 Ohio seventh congressional district general election
Party	Candidate	Votes	%	±%
Republican	Mike DeWine	87,842	56.26%	−19.86%
Democratic	Roger D. Tackett	65,543	41.98%	+18.10%
Libertarian	John B. Winer	2,761	1.77%	+1.77%
Total votes		156,146	100.00%	

1984 Ohio seventh congressional district general election
Party	Candidate	Votes	%	±%
Republican	Mike DeWine (incumbent)	147,885	78.45%	+22.19%
Democratic	Don Scott	40,621	21.55%	−20.43%
Total votes		188,506	100.00%	

1986 Ohio seventh congressional district general election
Party	Candidate	Votes	%	±%
Republican	Mike DeWine (incumbent)	119,238	100.00%	+21.55%
Total votes		119,238	100.00%	

1988 Ohio seventh congressional district general election
Party	Candidate	Votes	%	±%
Republican	Mike DeWine (incumbent)	142,597	73.88%	−26.12%
Democratic	Jack Schira	50,423	26.12%	+26.12%
Total votes		193,020	100.00%	

1990 Ohio lieutenant gubernatorial Republican primary
Party	Candidate	Votes	%	±%
Republican	Mike DeWine	645,224	100.00%	
Total votes		645,224	100.00%	

1990 Ohio lieutenant gubernatorial general election
Party	Candidate	Votes	%	±%
Republican	Mike DeWine	1,938,103	55.73%	+16.35%
Democratic	Eugene Branstool	1,539,416	44.27%	−16.35%
Total votes		3,477,519	100.00%	

1992 Ohio Senate Republican primary
Party	Candidate	Votes	%	±%
Republican	Mike DeWine	583,805	70.30%	
Republican	George H. Rhodes	246,625	29.70%	
Total votes		830,430	100.00%	

1992 Ohio Senate general election
Party	Candidate	Votes	%	±%
Democratic	John Glenn (incumbent)	2,444,419	50.99%	−11.46%
Republican	Mike DeWine	2,028,300	42.31%	+4.76%
Workers World	Martha Grevatt	321,234	6.70%	+6.70%
Total votes		4,793,953	100.00%	

1994 Ohio Senate Republican primary
Party	Candidate	Votes	%	±%
Republican	Mike DeWine	422,367	52.04%	
Republican	Bernadine Healy	263,560	32.47%	
Republican	Eugene J. Watts	83,103	10.24%	
Republican	George H. Rhodes	42,633	5.25%	
Total votes		811,663	100.00%	

1994 Ohio Senate general election
Party	Candidate	Votes	%	±%
Republican	Mike DeWine	1,836,556	53.43%	+10.41%
Democratic	Joel Hyatt	1,348,213	39.22%	−17.75%
Independent	Joseph I. Slovenec	252,031	7.33%	+7.33%
Independent	Dan S. Burkhardt (write-in)	282	0.01%	+0.01%
Socialist Workers	Peter A. Thierjung (write-in)	166	0.01%	+0.01%
Total votes		3,437,248	100.00%	

2000 Ohio Senate Republican primary
Party	Candidate	Votes	%	±%
Republican	Mike DeWine (incumbent)	1,029,860	79.51%	+27.47%
Republican	Ronald Dickson	161,185	12.44%	
Republican	Frank Cremeans	104,219	8.05%	
Total votes		1,295,264	100.00%	

2000 Ohio Senate general election
Party	Candidate	Votes	%	±%
Republican	Mike DeWine (incumbent)	2,666,736	59.90%	+6.47%
Democratic	Ted Celeste	1,597,122	35.87%	−3.35%
Libertarian	John R. McAlister	117,466	2.64%	+2.64%
Natural Law	John A. Eastman	70,738	1.59%	+1.59%
Socialist Workers	Michael Fitzsimmons (write-in)	45	0.00%	−0.01%
Independent	Patrick Flower (write-in)	29	0.00%	+0.00%
Total votes		4,452,136	100.00%	

2006 Ohio Senate Republican primary
Party	Candidate	Votes	%	±%
Republican	Mike DeWine (incumbent)	565,580	71.71%	−7.80%
Republican	David R. Smith	114,186	14.48%	
Republican	William G. Pierce	108,978	13.82%	
Total votes		788,744	100.00%	

2006 Ohio Senate general election
Party	Candidate	Votes	%	±%
Democratic	Sherrod Brown	2,257,485	56.16%	+20.29%
Republican	Mike DeWine (incumbent)	1,761,092	43.82%	−16.08%
Independent	Richard A. Duncan (write-in)	830	0.02%	+0.02%
Total votes		4,019,407	100.00%	

2010 Ohio Attorney General Republican primary
Party	Candidate	Votes	%	±%
Republican	Mike DeWine	687,507	100.00%	
Total votes		687,507	100.00%	

2010 Ohio Attorney General general election
Party	Candidate	Votes	%	±%
Republican	Mike DeWine	1,821,408	47.54%	+9.11%
Democratic	Richard Cordray (incumbent)	1,772,717	46.26%	−10.48%
Constitution	Robert M. Owens	130,065	3.39%	−1.44%
Libertarian	Marc Allen Feldman	107,521	2.81%	+2.81%
Total votes		3,831,711	100.00%	

2014 Ohio Attorney General Republican primary
Party	Candidate	Votes	%	±%
Republican	Mike DeWine (incumbent)	544,763	100.00%	+0.00%
Total votes		544,763	100.00%	

2014 Ohio Attorney General general election
Party	Candidate	Votes	%	±%
Republican	Mike DeWine (incumbent)	1,882,048	61.50%	+13.96%
Democratic	David Pepper	1,178,426	38.51%	−7.75%
Total votes		3,060,474	100.00%	

2018 Ohio gubernatorial Republican primary
Party	Candidate	Votes	%	±%
Republican	Mike DeWine	499,639	59.84%	
Republican	Mary Taylor	335,328	40.16%	
Total votes		834,967	100.00%	

2018 Ohio gubernatorial election
Party	Candidate	Votes	%	±%
Republican	Mike DeWine	2,235,825	50.40%	−13.24%
Democratic	Richard Cordray	2,070,046	46.67%	+13.64%
Libertarian	Travis Irvine	80,055	1.80%	+1.80%
Green	Constance Gadell-Newton	49,536	1.12%	−2.21%
Independent	Renea Turner (write-in)	185	0.00%	+0.00%
Independent	Richard Duncan (write-in)	132	0.00%	+0.00%
Independent	Rebecca Ayres (write-in)	41	0.00%	+0.00%
Total votes		4,435,820	100.00%	

2022 Ohio gubernatorial Republican primary
Party	Candidate	Votes	%	±%
Republican	Mike DeWine (incumbent)	519,594	48.11%	
Republican	Jim Renacci	302,494	28.01%	
Republican	Joe Blystone	235,584	21.81%	
Republican	Ron Hood	22,411	2.07%	
Total votes		1,080,083	100.00%	

2022 Ohio gubernatorial election
Party	Candidate	Votes	%	±%
Republican	Mike DeWine (incumbent)	2,580,424	62.41%	+12.02%
Democratic	Nan Whaley	1,545,489	37.38%	−9.30%
Write-in		8,964	0.22%	N/A
Total votes		4,134,877	100.00%	

U.S. House of Representatives
Preceded by Bud Brown	Member of the U.S. House of Representatives from Ohio's 7th congressional district 1983–1991	Succeeded by Dave Hobson
Party political offices
Preceded by Bob Taft	Republican nominee for Lieutenant Governor of Ohio; 1990	Succeeded by Nancy Hollister
Preceded by Tom Kindness	Republican nominee for U.S. Senator from Ohio (Class 3); 1992	Succeeded by George Voinovich
Preceded by George Voinovich	Republican nominee for U.S. Senator from Ohio (Class 1); 1994, 2000, 2006	Succeeded by Josh Mandel
Preceded by Mike Crites	Republican nominee for Attorney General of Ohio; 2010, 2014	Succeeded by Dave Yost
Preceded by John Kasich	Republican nominee for Governor of Ohio; 2018, 2022	Succeeded by Vivek Ramaswamy
Political offices
Preceded by Paul Leonard	Lieutenant Governor of Ohio; 1991–1994	Succeeded by Nancy Hollister
Preceded by John Kasich	Governor of Ohio; 2019–present	Incumbent
U.S. Senate
Preceded by Howard Metzenbaum	U.S. Senator (Class 1) from Ohio; 1995–2007; Served alongside: John Glenn, George Voinovich	Succeeded by Sherrod Brown
Legal offices
Preceded by Richard Cordray	Attorney General of Ohio; 2011–2019	Succeeded by Dave Yost
U.S. order of precedence (ceremonial)
Preceded by JD Vance as Vice President	Order of precedence of the United States; Within Ohio	Succeeded by Mayor of city in which event is held
Preceded by JD Vance as Vice President	Order of precedence of the United States; Within Ohio	Succeeded by Otherwise Mike Johnson as Speaker of the House
Preceded by Bill Lee as Governor of Tennessee	Order of precedence of the United States; Outside Ohio	Succeeded by Jeff Landry as Governor of Louisiana
