= The Worst Person in the World (book) =

Book by Keith Olbermann

The Worst Person in the World: And 202 Strong Contenders
- Author: Keith Olbermann
- Language: English
- Publisher: John Wiley & Sons
- Publication date: September 2006
- Publication place: United States
- ISBN: 978-0-470-04495-7

The Worst Person in the World: And 202 Strong Contenders is a book by former MSNBC newscaster-commentator Keith Olbermann.

Published in September 2006 by John Wiley & Sohns, Inc., it is based on the regular feature of the same title prominent in MSNBC's week-nightly television program Countdown with Keith Olbermann, in which Olbermann castigates those whose words or deeds have offended him. The book contains transcripts of the show's "Worst Person" segments from its inception in July 2005 to May 31, 2006, as well as some original "awards", including an "Honorary Worst" to President George W. Bush (later given several regular "worsts" on the program) and a special "Worst in Show" to Olbermann's staple target, rival news commentator Bill O'Reilly.

In the book's introduction, Olbermann credits the comedy team of Bob and Ray for inspiring the segment's title. Their "Worst Person in the World" (W.P.I.T.W. for short) was an "ominous character" who spoke only in "crunching and slurping sound effects" and consumed sandwiches without removing their wax paper covering. According to Olbermann, this character was inspired by theater critic John Simon, who was unimpressed with Bob and Ray's 1970 Broadway show. When New York Times television critic Alessandra Stanley gave Olbermann's fellow MSNBC commentator Tucker Carlson's show an unfavorable review in June 2005, the Bob and Ray character came to mind and with it the idea for the Countdown segment.
