= Countdown with Keith Olbermann =

2003–2012 American TV series

- Presented by: Keith Olbermann
- Country of origin: United States
- Original language: English
- No. of episodes: 1,400+

Production
- Production locations: Secaucus, New Jersey (April 3, 2003 – October 19, 2007); New York City (October 22, 2007 – January 21, 2011; June 20, 2011 – March 29, 2012)
- Running time: 60 minutes (March 2003 – January 2011; June 2011 – March 2012); 63 minutes (some episodes in June 2011)

Original release
- Network: MSNBC
- Release: March 31, 2003 – January 21, 2011
- Network: Current TV
- Release: June 20, 2011 – March 29, 2012
- Network: iHeartRadio
- Release: August 1, 2022 – present

Logo used from 2011 to 2012

Countdown with Keith Olbermann is a weekday podcast that originated as an hour-long weeknight news and political commentary program hosted by Keith Olbermann that aired on MSNBC from 2003 to 2011 and on Current TV from 2011 to 2012. The show presented five selected news stories of the day, with commentary by Olbermann and interviews of guests.

Our charge for the immediate future is to stay out of the way of the news. ... News is the news. We will not be screwing around with it. ... As times improve and the war [in Iraq] ends we will begin to introduce more and more elements familiar to my style.

The show was known for Olbermann's fast-paced rhetoric, historical and pop culture references, and liberal commentary. Olbermann melded news stories, both serious and light, with commentary, much of it critical of Republicans and conservative politics. The show has been the source of controversy owing to these criticisms, as well as the host's ongoing commentary against Fox News and his feud with its leading primetime personality Bill O'Reilly.

During the January 21, 2011, edition of Countdown, Olbermann announced that it would be his last appearance on the show, but he gave no explanation why. The New York Times reported the following day that Olbermann had negotiated his exit from MSNBC with a secret deal. After being hired by Current TV, Olbermann announced on April 26, 2011, that his nightly news program on the new network would begin June 20, 2011, and would also be called Countdown with Keith Olbermann. On March 30, 2012, Current TV abruptly terminated its relationship with Olbermann and replaced his show with a program hosted by Eliot Spitzer.

On August 1, 2022, Olbermann began producing and hosting a weekday podcast also titled "Countdown with Keith Olbermann", for iHeart Media.

== History ==
=== MSNBC period ===
Countdown with Keith Olbermann began as a successor program to Countdown: Iraq with anchor Lester Holt, which ran from October 2002 until March 31, 2003, anticipating and providing coverage for the Iraq War. Countdown: Iraq was broadcast at 8:00 p.m. on weekday nights, having replaced a cancelled talk show hosted by Phil Donahue. Olbermann, who left MSNBC in the late 1990s, returned to the network around this time and replaced Holt, becoming the permanent host for the renamed Countdown with Keith Olbermann. The show did not feature political commentary in its first few years, simply recapping the news of the day in a "5-4-3-2-1" format as the title suggested.

Countdown began to attract liberal and progressive viewers in 2005 when Olbermann began critiquing and satirizing conservative media commentators, specifically Fox News and its main primetime anchor Bill O'Reilly. He criticized Fox and O'Reilly for purportedly deceiving their viewers in service to their alleged right-wing biases, frequently including the latter in Countdown's "Worst Person in the World" segment. O'Reilly, while not directly mentioning Olbermann, launched an online petition implicitly asking MSNBC to fire him, and, in conjunction with a call-in campaign organized by Mike Stark, threatened Stark for mentioning Olbermann by name after phoning in to O'Reilly's radio show. O'Reilly and other Fox personalities accused MSNBC of facilitating a liberal media bias, in what Olbermann described as a war of attrition intended to force him into silence.

In 2006, Olbermann started delivering occasional "Special Comments" in which he has expressed sharp criticisms of members of the George W. Bush administration, including then-Secretary of Defense Donald Rumsfeld, Vice President Dick Cheney and President George W. Bush. While further Special Comments were directed at members of the Republican Party, Olbermann occasionally targeted Democrats as well. Issues addressed in the Special Comments dealt with the Bush Administration's foreign and domestic policies, mainly the wars in Iraq and Afghanistan. One of the Special Comments spoke out against the passage of Proposition 8 in California on November 4, 2008, for which he was awarded the 2009 GLAAD Media Award for "Outstanding TV Journalism Segment". Olbermann's Special Comments were compared to Edward R. Murrow's signature essays.

On two occasions, guest hosts for Countdown proved popular enough to be given their own MSNBC shows, contributing to a widespread perception of MSNBC being a left-leaning network. In 2008, Air America Radio personality Rachel Maddow hosted Countdown in Olbermann's absence, leading to the debut of her own program, The Rachel Maddow Show. In 2009, left-wing political analyst Lawrence O'Donnell hosted Countdown for an extended period, leading to the eventual launch of his show The Last Word. Subsequent guest hosts included progressive radio hosts Cenk Uygur and Sam Seder, Obama biographer Richard Wolffe, journalist Chris Hayes, and DNC chairman Howard Dean.

==== Hiatus and first cancellation ====
On October 28, 2010, five days before the 2010 U.S. elections, Olbermann donated $2,400 each to three Democratic candidates for Congress: Kentucky Senate candidate Jack Conway and Arizona Democratic Representatives Raul Grijalva and Gabby Giffords. In response, MSNBC President Phil Griffin suspended Olbermann indefinitely without pay on November 5 for violating a network policy regarding political contributions which required prior approval from management. An online petition calling for his reinstatement received over 250,000 signatures, and two days after the suspension began, Griffin announced that Olbermann would return to the air starting with the November 9 program.

On the January 21, 2011, episode of Countdown, Olbermann abruptly announced that the show would be his final MSNBC broadcast. Olbermann thanked viewers, producers, and technical staff for his show's eight-year success. However, he did not thank Griffin or NBC News president Steve Capus. Neither MSNBC nor Olbermann divulged the reason for his departure. Many liberal bloggers and commentators blamed the cable operator Comcast for Olbermann's firing, accusing the company of silencing the host for political purposes just days after Comcast acquired NBC Universal on January 18. Statements from MSNBC and Comcast denied this allegation. Media critic Howard Kurtz, former MSNBC anchor David Shuster, and an anonymous NBC News executive said that Olbermann's 2010 suspension was a more likely precipitating factor in Countdown's cancellation.

In subsequent interviews, Olbermann went into greater detail about the circumstances surrounding his exit from MSNBC. In an interview with The Hollywood Reporter published on June 7, 2011, Olbermann said he had faced increasing opposition from network management after the death of Tim Russert in June, 2008; Russert, the NBC Washington news bureau chief and moderator of Meet the Press, had been Olbermann's advocate and a peacemaker at the network. Olbermann further stated that "there were lots of people who were forced to choose sides" over his presence at MSNBC, including Maddow. Olbermann further claimed that he was not informed of his dismissal from MSNBC until less than a half-hour before his on-air farewell.

However, Olbermann's 2012 breach-of-contract lawsuit against Current TV indicated that Olbermann had been moved to leave MSNBC by Current founders Al Gore and Joel Hyatt. The lawsuit alleged that Gore and Hyatt had attempted to court Olbermann, despite being informed that he had two years remaining on his MSNBC contract, and reached an agreement for him to join the network the same month as his departure from MSNBC, according to court documents acquired by Warner Bros.-owned TMZ.

=== Current TV period ===
On February 8, Olbermann announced that he had been hired as the host of a new primetime show on Current TV, the cable television network founded by former vice president Al Gore and businessman Joel Hyatt; in April it was announced that the show would retain the Countdown title. Olbermann also became Current TV's "Chief News Officer" and bought an equity stake in the network. On May 11, Olbermann announced that Daily Kos founder Markos Moulitsas, filmmakers Michael Moore and Ken Burns, and comedian Richard Lewis would become contributors to the new Countdown. During a June 16 interview on NBC's Late Night with Jimmy Fallon, Olbermann further announced that journalists Matt Taibbi and Jeremy Scahill, former Nixon administration official and author John Dean, actor Donald Sutherland, and astronomer Derrick Pitts would also be contributors.

On June 20, Countdown debuted on Current TV, concluding with an abbreviated "Special Comment" in which Olbermann outlined his mission statement, quoting Harriet Beecher Stowe. The program drew 179,000 viewers, a significant increase from Current TV's typical 30,000 viewership; it drew more viewers than CNN in the key 25-54 audience demographic. Countdown continued to beat CNN in the 25-54 demo throughout its first week on Current TV. Countdown saw a drop in ratings in its second week, but sustained an audience of 310,000 total viewers by September. The show was taped at NEP Studio 33.

For the first two weeks of its Current TV run, Countdown ran slightly longer than an hour at sixty-three minutes in a covert effort to erode MSNBC's viewership. However, Olbermann changed his mind and reverted the running time to the usual sixty minutes, realizing the move "would only serve to annoy fans of" both Countdown and Rachel Maddow's MSNBC show while doing nothing to improve the ratings for his own program. By the fall of 2011, Olbermann came into conflict with Current TV management over production values and creative control and nearly left the network.

==== Second cancellation ====
On March 30, 2012, Current TV terminated its contract with Olbermann, thereby cancelling Countdown for a second time. In its statement, Current TV cited Olbermann's implied lack of "respect, openness, collegiality, and loyalty to our viewers." Internal sources reported that Olbermann's repeated absences, his failure to promote Current TV, and disparaging public comments he had made about the network contributed to the decision to fire him. Olbermann called Current TV's claims "untrue" and sued the network for breach-of-contract, demanding $50 million in damages. A counter-suit by Current TV cited Olbermann's work absences, as well as his allegedly abusive treatment of executives and staff. In March 2013, Olbermann and Current TV reached a settlement, with Olbermann receiving an undisclosed amount.

On April 3, 2012, Olbermann appeared on CBS's Late Show with David Letterman and voiced concern for his viewers and the production crew on Countdown, stating: "I screwed up. I screwed up really big on this." Olbermann referred to production issues, in-fighting, and key absences during political events as the primary reasons Current TV decided to pull Countdown from the network lineup.

=== Podcast ===
The daily podcast Countdown with Keith Olbermann launched on August 1, 2022, airing on iHeartMedia. It contains features from Olbermann's previous tv show of the same title, such as current events, political analysis, and sports, as well Olbermann’s career anecdotes and his “Worst Person in the World” segment.

== About the show ==
The show's theme music was the opening bars of the second movement of Beethoven's Ninth Symphony, a nod to NBC's Huntley-Brinkley Report and NBC Nightly News themes from the 1960s and 1970s. During the opening sequence of each nightly episode, Olbermann, in voice-over, previewed upcoming stories after asking: "Which of these stories will you be talking about tomorrow?" On MSNBC, the stories featured in the show's "countdown" were introduced by a "5-4-3-2-1" format; this format, however, was downplayed after Countdown's move to Current TV.

Musical commentary on the podcast is often provided by Nancy Faust on the "Stadium Organ." Olbermann frequently refers to her in closing credits as "the best baseball stadium organist ever".

=== "Worst Person in the World" segment ===
The "Worst Person in the World" segment was a nightly feature in which Olbermann recounts three news stories involving people saying or doing things that offended Olbermann. "Nominees" for the "Worst Person in the World" award were declared "worse", "worser", and "worst", which Olbermann refers to as bronze, silver, and gold levels, respectively. On a few occasions, during the show's MSNBC run, the segment was either briefly suspended or renamed in response to concerns that it contributed to an atmosphere of political divisiveness.

Based on this segment of the show, a book titled The Worst Person in the World was published in September 2006. It includes transcripts of segments that aired from this feature's inception on July 1, 2005, through May 31, 2006, as well as some original material. Another such book, Pitchforks and Torches—named after Olbermann's catchphrase in introducing the segment—was released in 2010.

A modified version, focused on sports, was featured on Olbermann's self titled ESPN2 sports show during its run. In this iteration the segment was preceded by a disclaimer that the nominations weren't meant entirely seriously and that those nominated were not literally the worst people in the sports world.

On October 7, 2020, Olbermann revived the "Worst Person in the World" branding for a current-events webseries, delivering an extended commentary on one selected individual (either Donald Trump or someone associated with his administration) followed by a brief rundown of other news headlines. Beginning with the fifteenth episode, dated October 27, the series was renamed "Olbermann vs. Trump".

=== "Time Marches On" segment ===
In the "Time Marches On" segment, another nightly feature, Olbermann showed footage of strange news stories from around the world. The segment was originally called "Oddball", a reference to the MSNBC program Hardball with Chris Matthews.

=== The "Keith number" ===
During the 2008 U.S. Presidential Primary season, Olbermann began using the term "Keith number" in reference to the sum of a pre-election opinion poll's margin of error and the percentage of respondents who are undecided. Olbermann believes this value tends to be predictive of the extent to which a poll may vary from actual election results, and also of the volatility of the electorate's leanings.

To summarize:

- The greater the poll's margin of error, the farther the results may be from the current views of the voters.
- The more undecided voters, the more likely voters are to change their views in the future.

On the January 11, 2008, episode of Countdown, Olbermann described the number as follows:

What, you ask, is the 'Keith number'? This is the margin of error plus the percentage of undecided — in this case, four-and-a-half margin of error plus five percent undecided. I thought of it, so I named it after myself. You think of a better caveat for polls from now on and we'll name it after you.

Olbermann's "Keith number" is unrelated (mathematically or otherwise) to the more traditional use of the term.

== Criticism and response ==
Olbermann has addressed the assertions of liberal bias by stating that he would be equally critical of a Democratic president who had invited criticism by his actions:

I mean, no one in 1998, no one accused me of being a liberal in 1998 because I was covering the Lewinsky scandal. And whatever I had to do about it, I tried to be fair and honest and as accurate and as informed as possible, and allow my viewer to be the same way. And nowadays it's the same thing. And now all of a sudden I'm a screaming liberal.

However, Howard Kurtz has written that Olbermann departed MSNBC the first time as a result of the Clinton-Lewinsky coverage, which he did not personally agree with. Elsewhere, Los Angeles Times TV critic Howard Rosenberg commented on the show's absence of guests who challenged Olbermann's views, writing: "'Countdown' is more or less an echo chamber in which Olbermann and like-minded bobbleheads nod at each other."

On November 25, 2006, Fox News Watch panelist Cal Thomas named Olbermann as his choice for 2006's "Media Turkey Award" for what Thomas alleged were Olbermann's "inaccuracies" and "hot air". Olbermann in turn gave the show the Bronze for "Worst Person in the World", not for naming him "Turkey of the Year" but for misspelling his last name as "Olberman" on the onscreen graphic.

== Guests ==
Regular contributors featured on the show in its Current TV run included:

- David Shuster, former MSNBC anchor and "primary substitute anchor" since June 7, 2011
- Matt Taibbi, Rolling Stone journalist
- Michael Moore, filmmaker
- Ken Burns, documentarian
- Richard Lewis, comedian and actor
- Sam Seder, host of The Majority Report and occasional substitute anchor.
- Markos Moulitsas, creator of Daily Kos
- John Dean, former White House Counsel to Richard Nixon—political
- Heather McGhee, Director of the Washington office of Demos
- Jonathan Turley, law professor at The George Washington University School of Law
- Maysoon Zayid, comedian and activist
- Kate Sheppard, Mother Jones energy and environmental reporter
- Jeremy Scahill, investigative journalist and author
- Donald Sutherland, actor
- Mark Ruffalo, actor
- Derrick Pitts, astronomer
- Nicole Lamoureux, the executive director of the National Association of Free Clinics

Regular contributors in the show's broadcast history on MSNBC included:

- Jonathan Alter, senior editor for Newsweek magazine—political
- Margaret Carlson, Time columnist and author of Anyone Can Grow Up: How George Bush and I Made it to the White House
- Chris Cillizza, blogger for The Washington Post
- Howard Fineman, editor and correspondent for Newsweek and The Huffington Post
- Christian Finnegan, comedian—tabloid/entertainment
- Christopher Hayes, Washington, D.C. editor for The Nation
- Chris Kofinis, Democratic political strategist
- Howard Dean, former Democratic National Committee chairman
- David Corn, political journalist and Washington D.C. bureau chief of Mother Jones
- Eugene Robinson, newspaper columnist for The Washington Post
- Joan Walsh, political pundit and journalist
- Paul F. Tompkins, comedian—tabloid/entertainment
- Richard Wolffe, political journalist and author
- Lynn Woolsey, chair of the Congressional Progressive Caucus
- Melissa Harris-Perry, professor of politics and African-American studies, Princeton University
- Jason Bateman, actor
- Shannyn Moore, contributor to The Huffington Post
- Wesley Clark, retired four-star general—military analyst for MSNBC
- E. J. Dionne, columnist for The Washington Post
- John Harwood, The New York Times writer and CNBC contributing reporter—political
- Richard Justice, Sports Writer for the Houston Chronicle
- Rachel Maddow, who also served as a substitute anchor from April through August 2008, prior to the launch of her own program on MSNBC, The Rachel Maddow Show.
- Ron Reagan, political commentator and author who also served as a substitute anchor
- Arianna Huffington, columnist and co-founder of The Huffington Post
- General Barry McCaffrey, Ret. — military
- Joel McHale, host of the E! show The Soup - pop culture
- Maria Milito, New York disc jockey — American Idol
- Michael Musto, editor of The Village Voice— tabloid/entertainment
- Lawrence O'Donnell, MSNBC political analyst and host of The Last Word with Lawrence O'Donnell
- Tom O'Neil, editor of Entertainment Weekly—entertainment
- Clarence Page, columnist and member of the editorial board of the Chicago Tribune
- Nate Silver, founder of FiveThirtyEight.com - for 2008 presidential election prediction
- Jon Soltz, Iraq War Veteran, co-founder and chairman of VoteVets.org
- Chuck Todd, political director for NBC News
- Clint Van Zandt, former FBI profiler—abductions/murders
- Robin Wright, diplomatic correspondent for The Washington Post —terrorism and international events

Interviews with comedians were featured regularly during the final segment of the show; notable appearances have included George Carlin, Lewis Black, Mo Rocca, and John Cleese.
