= Joel Hyatt =

American businessman

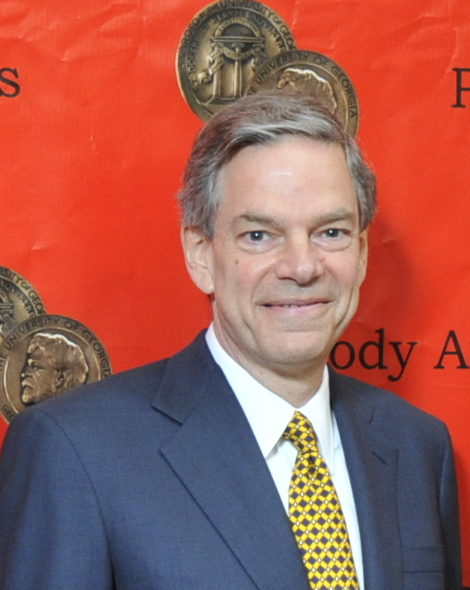
- Hyatt at the 69th Annual Peabody Awards
- Born: Joel Hyatt Zylberberg; May 6, 1950 (age 76)
- Education: Dartmouth College; Yale Law School
- Occupations: Entrepreneur; (former) Attorney; (former) Professor
- Political party: Democratic

Joel Z. Hyatt (born Joel Hyatt Zylberberg; May 6, 1950) is an American entrepreneur and former politician. He founded Hyatt Legal Services, and was featured in his firm's nationwide television commercials which always ended with the slogan, "I'm Joel Hyatt and you have my word on it." Hyatt was a co-founder of Current TV.

== Life and career ==
Hyatt graduated from Dartmouth College and Yale Law School. He briefly practiced law as an associate at Paul, Weiss, Rifkind, Wharton & Garrison.

Hyatt co-founded Hyatt Legal Services in 1977 as a low-cost legal service, making legal services available to millions of hitherto disenfranchised middle- and lower-class Americans. He later founded Hyatt Legal Plans, which became the country's largest provider of employer-sponsored group legal services, pioneering the concept of legal services as a fringe benefit (provided in the same manner as, for example, dental insurance). Hyatt Legal Plans was acquired by MetLife in 1997.

Hyatt was a founding member of the U.S. Senate Democratic Leadership Circle and was a member of that group from 1981 to 1986. He was the Democratic National Committee's assistant treasurer from 1981 to 1983.

Hyatt is the son-in-law of Howard Metzenbaum, former United States Senator for Ohio. Hyatt was Metzenbaum's campaign manager for his first two successful bids for the Senate. In the 1994 election, when Metzenbaum decided to retire, Hyatt ran to replace him. Hyatt won the Democratic nomination, but lost to then Lieutenant Governor of Ohio Michael DeWine in the general election, in a campaign year in which Republicans swept all twelve of the Senate vacancies and unseated many incumbents.

In 1990, Hyatt Legal Services paid a $157,000 settlement for having illegally fired an attorney in their Philadelphia offices, Clarence B. Cain, in reference to his AIDS diagnosis. The case was an inspiration for the 1993 film Philadelphia, alongside the more renowned Geoffrey Bowers case three-years prior. Hyatt is known to have expressed his disappointment in his own firm's handling of the case, and of its treatment of Mr. Cain.

Hyatt was appointed to the California Public Utilities Commission in June 1999, by Governor Gray Davis. He served six months of a six-year term, resigning in December 1999.

Hyatt served as National Finance Chair for the Democratic party in 2000, and is a business partner of former U.S. Vice President Al Gore. In 2004, Hyatt and Gore purchased Newsworld International, a cable news channel, programmed by the Canadian Broadcasting Corporation, which aired news programming from around the world. On August 1, 2005, Gore and Hyatt relaunched the network as Current TV, a young adult-programmed news and information service which pioneered the concept of user generated content on cable TV. Hyatt and Gore later sold the channel to Al Jazeera Media Network on January 2, 2013 for a reported $500 million. In August 2014, Hyatt and Gore sued Al Jazeera for fraud and breach of contract in connection with a residual payment of $65 million that remained unpaid. The allegations were denied by Al Jazeera as "blatantly false" and "potentially misleading."

Hyatt taught entrepreneurship at Stanford University Graduate School of Business from 1998 to 2003 and at Stanford Law school. He is a member of the board of trustees of Morehouse College and of The Brookings Institution. Hyatt was elected to the board of directors of Hewlett-Packard Company in May 2007, and of The RAND Corporation in March 2015. Hyatt is a member of the Council on Foreign Relations. He also serves on the board of Stanford Hospital.

Hyatt was an investor in and chairman of VideoSurf, a computer vision search engine that was acquired by Microsoft in 2011.

Globality Inc, based in Menlo Park, California, is Joel Hyatt's current business venture. The company was co-founded by Joel Hyatt and Lior Delgo in March 2015. At the time of its launch, Globality had invited 350 advertising companies to use its services. In 2019, SoftBank invested $100m.

== Books ==
- The Long Boom: A History of the World's Future, 1980-2020, by Peter Schwartz, Peter Leyden, and Joel Hyatt (Basic Books, 2000)

== Electoral History ==
1994 Ohio Senate Democratic primary
Party	Candidate	Votes	%
Democratic	Joel Hyatt	432,361	46.25%
Democratic	Mary O. Boyle	415,853	44.48%
Democratic	Ralph A. Applegate	86,677	9.27%
Total votes		934,891	100.00%

1994 Ohio Senate general election
Party	Candidate	Votes	%	±%
Republican	Mike DeWine	1,836,556	53.43%	+10.41%
Democratic	Joel Hyatt	1,348,213	39.22%	−17.75%
Independent	Joseph I. Slovenec	252,031	7.33%	+7.33%
Independent	Dan S. Burkhardt (write-in)	282	0.01%	+0.01%
Socialist Workers	Peter A. Thierjung (write-in)	166	0.01%	+0.01%
Total votes		3,437,248	100.00%	

Party political offices
Preceded by Howard Metzenbaum	Democratic nominee for U.S. Senator from Ohio (Class 1); 1994	Succeeded by Ted Celeste
