= NewsCenter =

NewsCenter, or NewsCentre, is a brand that has been used by many broadcasting entities to refer to its regular newscasts mostly with NBC's Owned Television Stations and affiliate stations.

In particular, NewsCenter may refer to:

== United States ==
=== NBC Owned-and-operated Stations ===
- KNBC-TV, in Los Angeles with NewsCenter 4 from 1974 to 1982
- WMAQ-TV, in Chicago with NewsCenter 5 from 1974 to 1982
- WNBC-TV, in New York with NewsCenter 4 from 1974 to 1980
- WRC-TV, in Washington D.C. with NewsCenter 4 from 1974 to 1982

=== Others ===
- Common Dreams NewsCenter
- KARK-TV, in Little Rock with NewsCenter 4 from 1974 to 1980
- KCST-TV (now KNSD) in San Diego with NewsCenter 39 from 1977 to 1988
- KGUN-TV in Tucson with NewsCenter 9 during the 1970s and 1980s
- KHBS/KHOG-TV in Fort Smith, Arkansas
- KHOU, in Houston with NewsCenter 11 from 1979 to 1984
- KJRH-TV in Tulsa with Newscenter 2 in the 1970s to 1990
- KKTV in Colorado Springs, Colorado with NewsCenter 11 from 1979 until 1989
- KMTV-TV in Omaha with NewsCenter 3 in the 1980s and 1990s
- KNBN in Rapid City, South Dakota with its NewsCenter1 branding
- KOA-TV (now KCNC-TV) in Denver with NewsCenter 4 from 1980 until 1989
- KPRC-TV in Houston with its newsroom branded as the "KPRC Newscenter" from 1997 to 2006
- KRON-TV in San Francisco with NewsCenter 4 from 1977 to 2001
- KTTC in Rochester, Minnesota
- NotiCentro, the branding of the news division of WAPA-TV in San Juan, Puerto Rico
- WBKO in Bowling Green, Kentucky with NewsCenter13 from the early 1980s until 2002.
- WCAU in Philadelphia with NewsCenter 10 from January to September 1995
- WCSH in Portland, Maine, along with Bangor satellite station WLBZ with News Center Maine
- WCVB-TV in Boston using NewsCenter 5 since its sign on in 1972
- WDSU-TV in New Orleans with NewsCenter 6 from June 1, 1978 to 1987
- WECT in Wilmington, North Carolina, with NewsCenter 6 in the 1980s and “WECT NewsCenter” 1989 until 1993.
- WESH-TV in Orlando, using NewsCenter 2 from 1980s to 1991
- WGRZ-TV, in Buffalo, New Yorkn with NewsCenter 2 from 1974 to 1980
- WHIO-TV at Dayton, Ohio, using NewsCenter 7 since the 1970s
- WJKW (now WJW) in Cleveland using NewsCenter 8 from 1978 to 1995
- WKMG-TV in Orlando with WKMG Newscenter 6 from 2000 to 2001
- WMGM-TV in Atlantic City, New Jersey, with NewsCenter 40
- WRGB in Schenectady, New York, with NewsCenter 6
- WSVN in Miami withg NewsCenter 7 from February 1980 to 1988
- WTHR-TV in Indianapolis which used the hybrid brand Eyewitness NewsCenter 13 from 1976 to 1979

== Outside U.S. ==
=== Australia ===
- News Centre Nine
- News Centre Six for BTV/GMV

=== Canada ===
- CBUT, the CBC owned and operated station in Vancouver, British Columbia, briefly branded its local newscasts as Newscentre in the mid- to late-1980's
- CFQC-TV, the CTV affiliate in Saskatoon, Saskatchewan used the NewsCentre branding for their local newscasts during the 1980's and early 1990's.
