= Richard Justice (sports journalist) =

American sports journalist

Richard Justice is a columnist for MLB.com. He used to work for The Baltimore Sun, The Washington Post, The Dallas Morning News and the Houston Chronicle. Justice is an alumnus of The University of Texas at Austin.

He is also a correspondent for ESPN, and occasionally appears as a guest on their programs Pardon the Interruption and formerly on Classic Now. He has made five appearances on the program/game show Around the Horn, though he has won only once. He is also a frequent guest on Tony Kornheiser's podcast.

Following a stint as a weekly contributor to the morning show on Sportsradio 610, Justice hosted his own sports talk program on 1560 AM KGOW ('"The Game"). The show aired M–F at 10:00 am – 12:00 pm. It was cancelled due to a lack of response from the listeners and community as well as bad satellite interruption. He is now featured weekly on each of 1560 AM KGOW's ("The Game") shows on different days and brings additional baseball commentary.
