= Kevin Blackistone =

American sportswriter (born 1959)

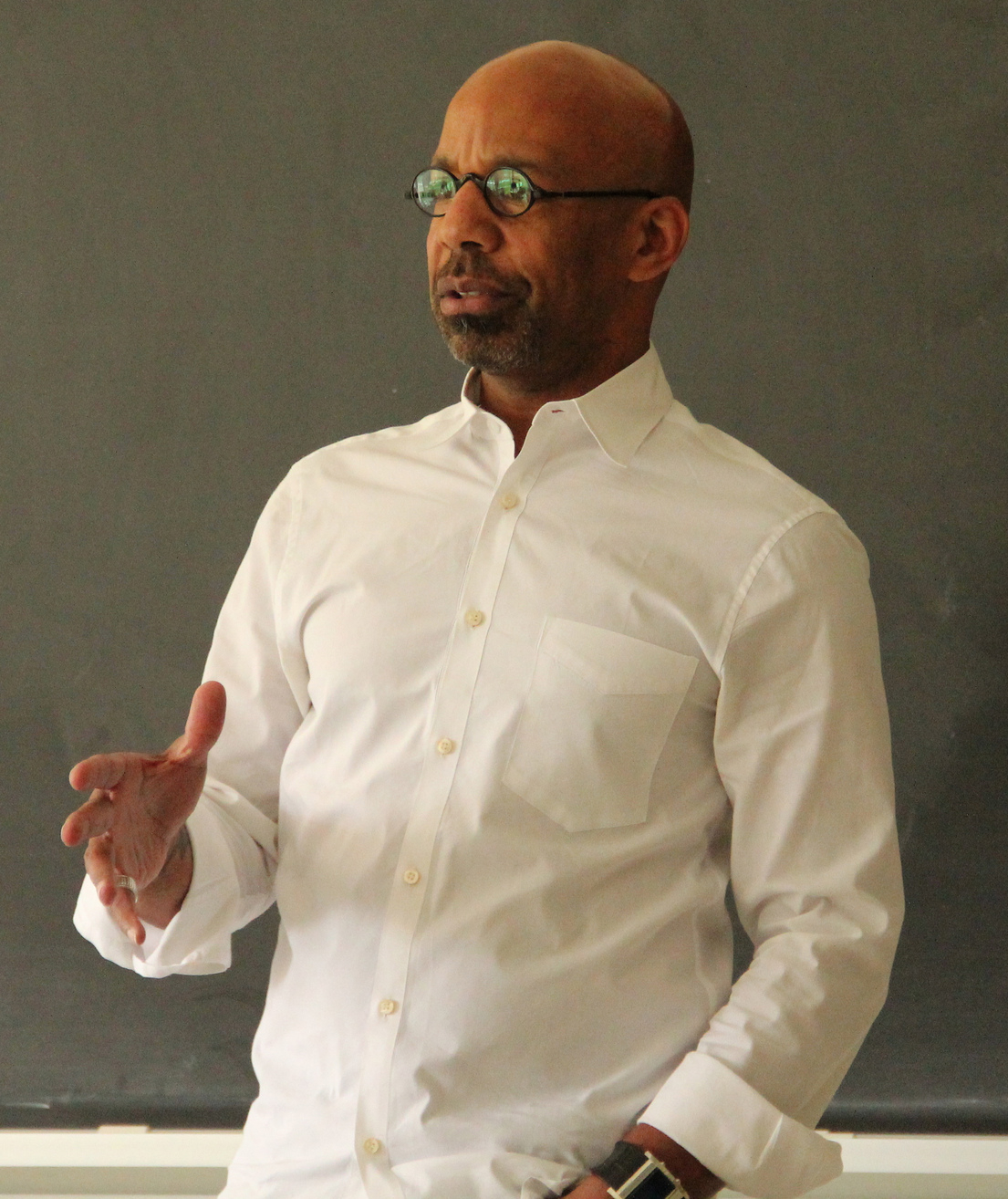
- Blackistone in 2012
- Born: October 17, 1959 (age 67); Washington, D.C.
- Education: Northwestern University, '81; B.S., Journalism
- Occupations: Sports columnist Radio host Television host Professor
- Children: 1 daughter

Kevin Blackistone (born October 17, 1959) is an American sports journalist and professor for Philip Merrill College of Journalism at the University of Maryland, as well as a frequent panelist for ESPN's Around the Horn. On radio, he appears as a frequent guest co-host on the Sports Reporters on DC's ESPN980. From 2003 up until Around the Horn's conclusion in 2025 Blackistone had 386 wins when he was on the show. He has also hosted some episodes of Pardon the Interruption when Tony Kornheiser or Michael Wilbon were not in. Blackistone's reporting focuses primarily on the intersection of sports, race, and politics.

== Career ==
Blackistone was born in Washington, D.C., and raised in Hyattsville, Maryland. He is a graduate of Our Lady of Good Counsel High School.

Blackistone started his career in journalism as a city side reporter at The Boston Globe newspaper in 1981, after graduating from Northwestern University's Medill School of Journalism. In 1983, he wrote for The Chicago Reporter, a monthly investigative magazine on Chicago's racial and social issues. In 1986, Blackistone joined The Dallas Morning News as a reporter in the City section; he later moved to the Business section covering economics, and the Metropolitan section covering city events and issues.

After covering Nelson Mandela's U.S. tour in 1990, moved to SportsDay to cover sports business and write columns. A year later, he became a full-time SportsDay columnist. He continued until September 2006, when Blackistone was one of 111 journalists to accept a buyout offer from the News, forcing his departure from the newspaper on September 15, 2006. Editor Bob Mong, in an article on the buyouts, wrote of Blackistone: "His thoughtful and probing journalism almost always stimulated response from readers, and, in this hyper-busy world, that's saying something."

Blackistone recently has served as a contributing writer to the web site Politico.com. He served as a columnist for the sports–oriented website FanHouse from October 2007 – March 2011; Blackistone left the website when it was bought by the Sporting News. He is currently an independent columnist, and contributes to the iPad-only newspaper The Daily.

In August 2008, he accepted the position of the Shirley Povich chair of the Philip Merrill College of Journalism at the University of Maryland, where he now teaches sports journalism.

In addition to his teaching position and his frequent appearances on Around the Horn, Blackistone delivers analysis on sports for the PBS NewsHour from time to time.

In 2020, he joined The Washington Post as a sports columnist.

Blackistone co-produced "Imagining the Indian," a 2022 documentary about the exploitation of Native American culture as team mascots.

=== Awards ===
Blackistone's several honors include first- and second-place awards for sports column writing from the Texas Associated Press Managing Editors (APME), a Chicago Newspaper Guild award for investigative reporting, and a National Association of Black Journalists award for enterprise reporting. He was also a member of a team that won a Texas APME award and, several times, a finalist for a Press Club of Dallas Katie Award.
