= Adam Schefter =

American sportswriter and reporter (born 1966)

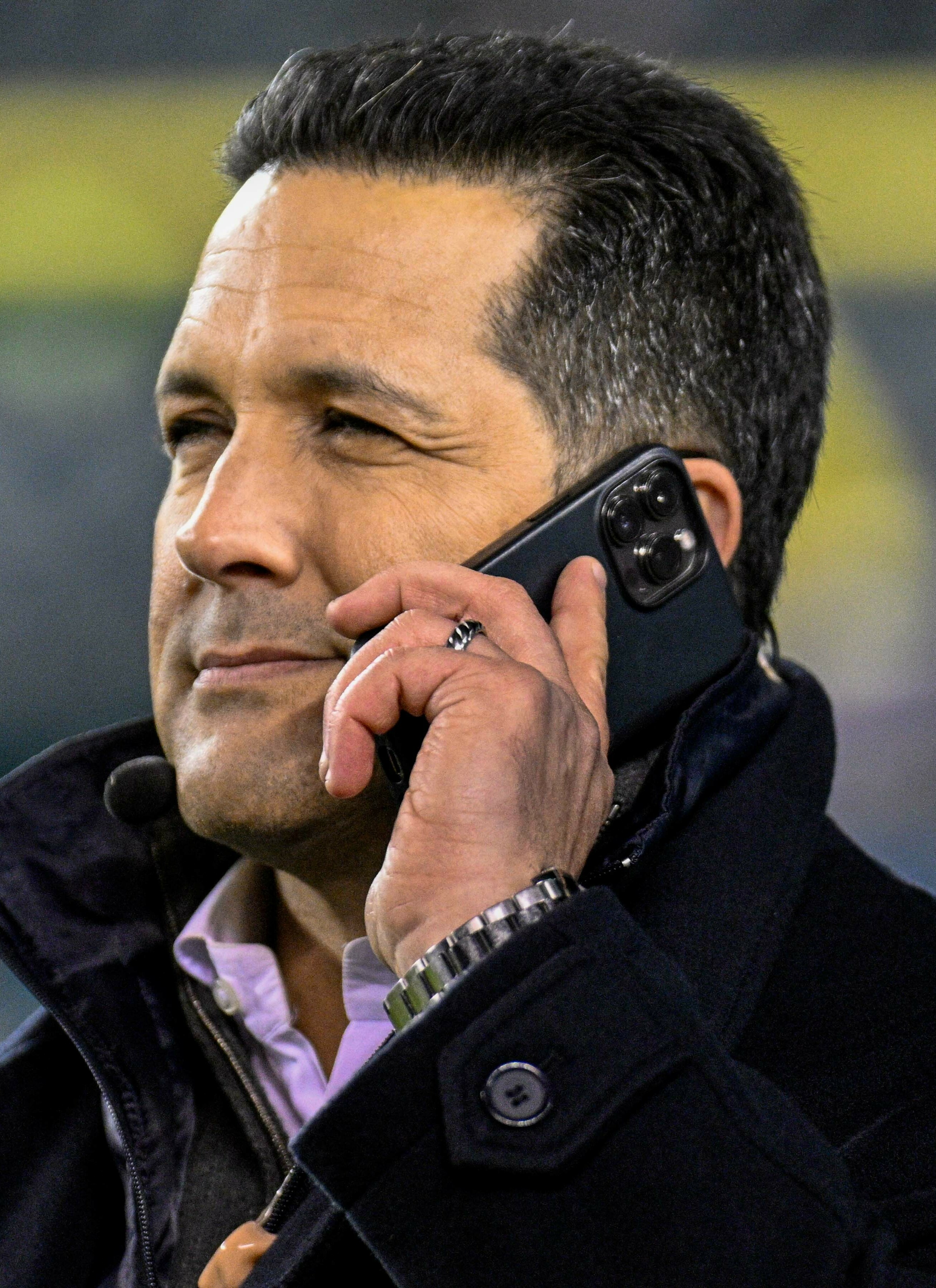
- Schefter in 2022
- Born: December 21, 1966 (age 59); Valley Stream, New York, U.S.
- Education: University of Michigan; Northwestern University
- Occupation: Sports writer
- Spouse: Sharri Maio (m. 2007)
- Children: 2

Adam Schefter (born December 21, 1966) is an American sports writer and reporter. After graduating from University of Michigan and Northwestern University with degrees in journalism, Schefter wrote for several newspapers, including The Denver Post, before working at NFL Network. He has worked as an NFL insider for ESPN since 2009.

== Education and early career ==
Schefter was born to a Jewish family in Valley Stream, New York, and grew up in Bellmore, New York, where he attended John F. Kennedy High School. He graduated in June 1985. He is a 1989 graduate of the University of Michigan and a graduate of Northwestern University's Medill School of Journalism. Schefter was an editor at The Michigan Daily, where he began his newspaper career. While at Northwestern, Schefter worked as a freelance reporter for the Chicago Tribune. After graduating from Northwestern in June 1990, Schefter was an intern for the Seattle Post-Intelligencer before moving to Denver in 1990, when he started writing for the Rocky Mountain News in September 1990 and then The Denver Post in July 1996. While at the Denver Post, Schefter served as President of the Pro Football Writers of America from 2001 to 2002.

== Journalism career ==
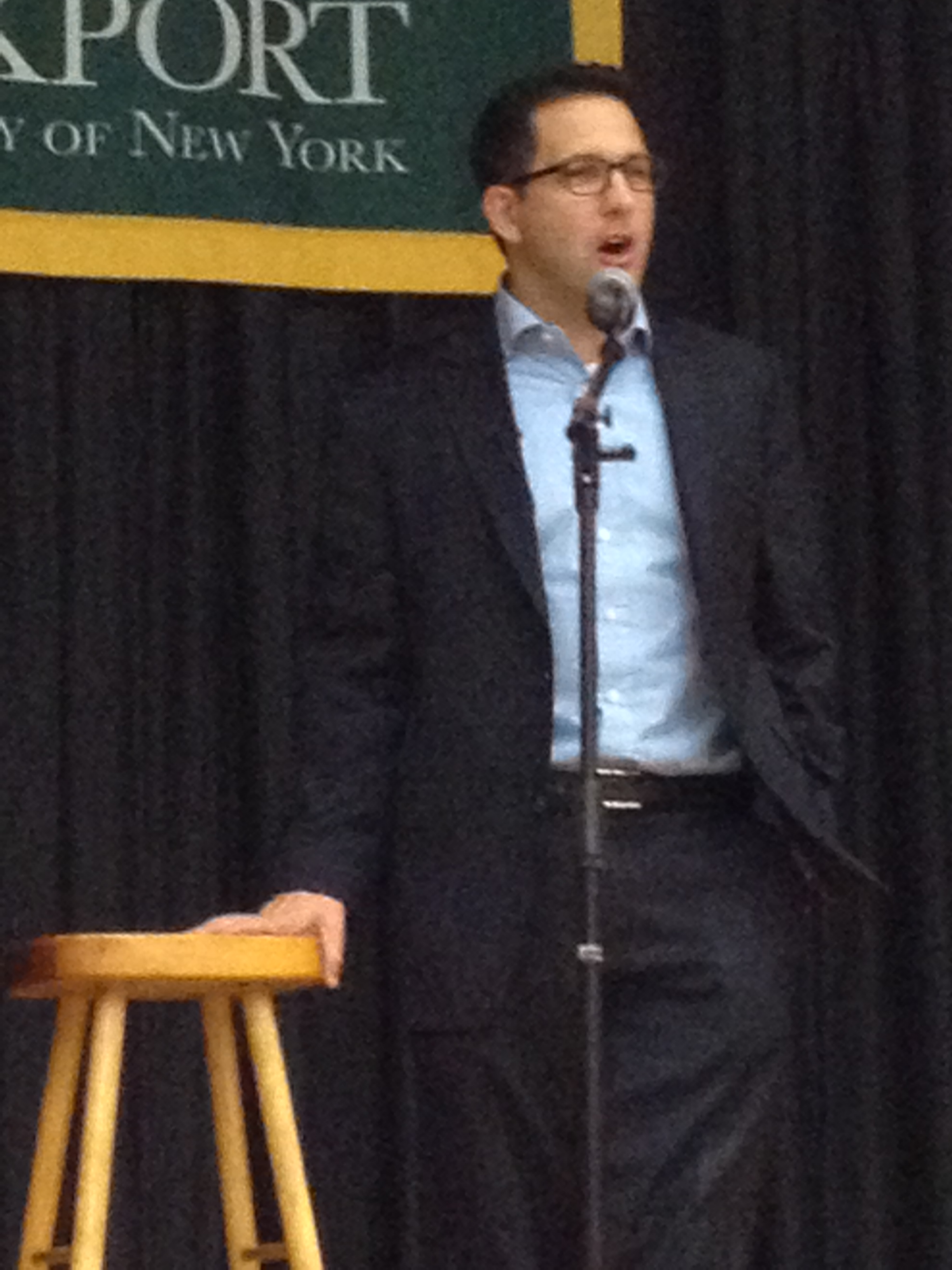
Schefter in 2013

Schefter joined the NFL Network in 2004 and appeared on NFL Total Access and also wrote for NFL.com. Before joining the NFL Network, Schefter appeared five times on ESPN's Around the Horn as a substitute for Woody Paige. Paige was based in Denver at the time. Before Around the Horn, Schefter appeared on ESPN's The Sports Reporters. Schefter appeared on NBC twice in the summer of 2008, working as the sideline reporter for Al Michaels and John Madden during the Redskins–Colts Pro Football Hall of Fame Game and then the Redskins–Jaguars preseason finale.

According to a USA Today survey of fans published January 19, 2009, "NFL Network's Adam Schefter edged ESPN's Chris Mortensen (34%–32%) for best (NFL) insider despite the NFL Network being in less than half as many U.S. households." Schefter was again selected as the best (NFL) insider in a November 2010 USA Today fan poll. Schefter was voted USA Today's best "insider" for a third straight year in November 2011.

In 2009, Schefter became a football analyst with ESPN. He began appearing on-air on August 17, 2009. In October 2010, Sports Illustrated writers included Schefter in its "Top 40," a listing of the NFL's top officials, executives, coaches, players and media members.

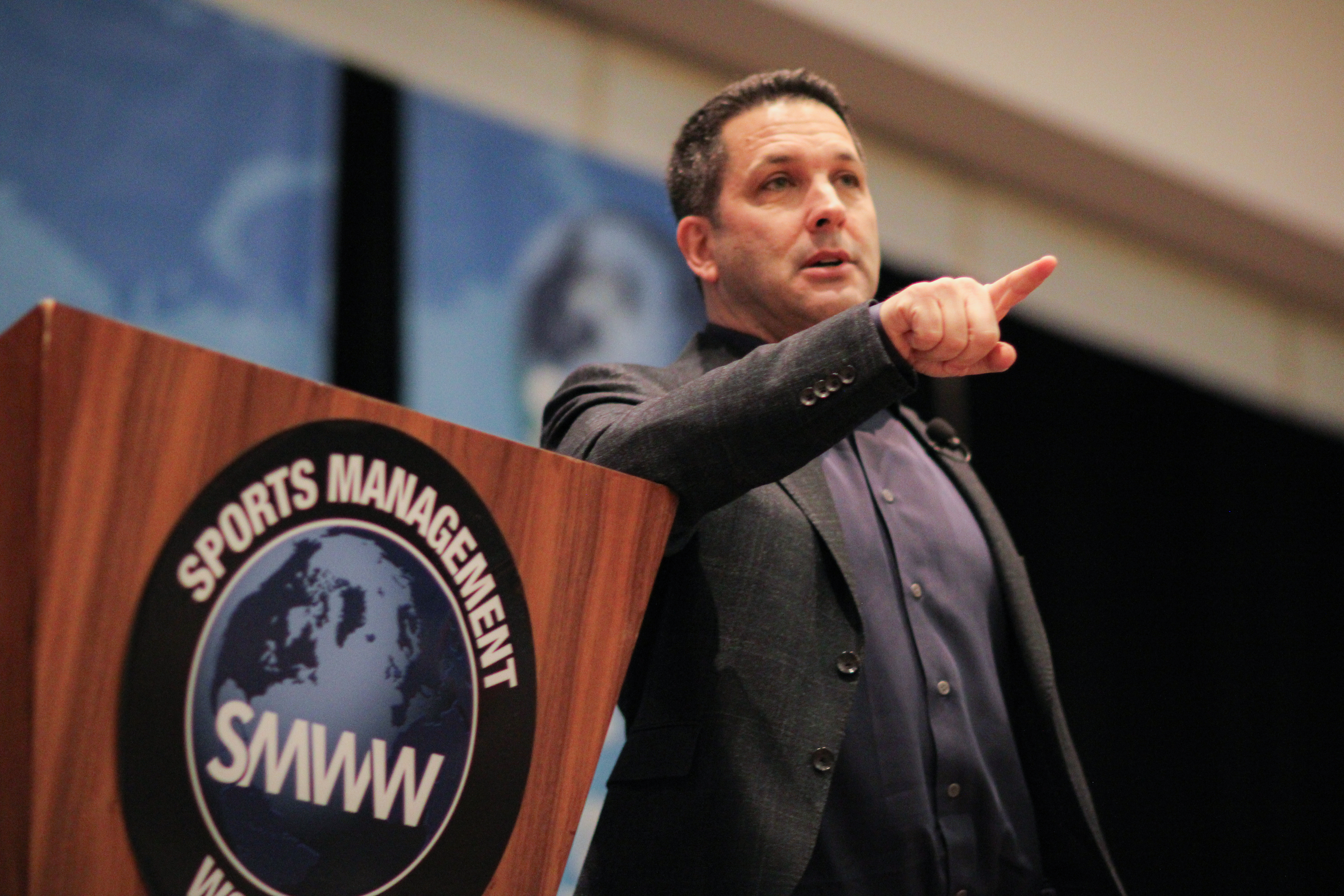
Adam Schefter speaking at the 2024 SMWW Football Career Conference

In 2014, Schefter was named the "Most Influential Tweeter in New York" by New York magazine in February, "Best Newsbreaker" by the sports media website Awful Announcing in its second annual People's Sports TV Award Winners in May, and SI.com's “Media Person of the Year.”

On July 9, 2015, Schefter tweeted a medical chart photo indicating that Jason Pierre-Paul had his right index finger amputated. On February 5, 2016, it was reported that two individuals were fired from Jackson Memorial Hospital after a lengthy investigation for violating HIPAA laws. Pierre-Paul sued Schefter and ESPN for breach of privacy in February 2016. In February 2017, Pierre-Paul and ESPN settled the lawsuit.

In November 2015, Schefter was named The Cynopsis Sports Media Personality of the Year, which is presented annually to an individual whose work in the sports industry has transcended how sports connect with fans. In the same year, he was named honorable mention for Sports Illustrated Now's 2015 Media Person of the Year, and 2015 Sports Media Personality of the Year by the Tampa Bay Times.

In January 2017, Schefter accepted an unpaid position on the advisory board of the Pacific Pro Football League. Soon afterward, he stepped down to avoid any perception of a conflict of interest.

Schefter joined the NBA on ESPN team for multiple games as a sideline reporter in 2017. His first assignment was February 15 between the New York Knicks and the Oklahoma City Thunder. ESPN presented Schefter with the opportunity to work select NBA games as part of his new contract.

In February 2017, ESPN Audio launched Schefter's "Know Them From Adam" podcast, featuring long-form conversations with newsmakers who have a connection to football. He is also an annual "NFL Combine Football Career Conference" speaker for the online sports-career training school Sports Management Worldwide.

In September 2021, Timothy L. O'Brien of Bloomberg reported that Schefter had invested in the sports gambling company Boom Entertainment, and questioned whether that interest could affect his reporting.

In June 2021, an email Schefter sent to Bruce Allen (then the general manager of the Washington Redskins) was filed as an exhibit in federal court as part of a defamation suit by Washington Football Team owner Daniel Snyder against an Indian media company. The message included a draft of an unpublished article about the 2011 NFL lockout which Schefter asked Allen to review and suggest changes to, and referred to Allen as "Mr. Editor". In response, Schefter stated that checking information with sources is a widespread practice. However, according to Joe Rivera of Sporting News, allowing a source to review an entire piece is a significant breach of journalistic ethics. Schefter's actions were also criticized by writer and former ESPN host Jemele Hill. Later, Schefter issued a statement through ESPN which stated that while he did not give editorial control over the story to Allen, sending it to him had been a mistake.

In 2022, Schefter was criticized for his initial report on Twitter about Dwayne Haskins's death, which many found to be insensitive as it mentioned his struggles in the NFL. Schefter later deleted the tweet and replaced it with a video tribute, as well as issuing an apology.

== Radio career ==
Schefter is a regular guest on numerous radio programs, including 104.3 KKFN in Denver, Colorado, ESPN 980 in Washington D.C., ESPN 1000 in Chicago, Illinois, and 97.5 The Fanatic in Philadelphia, Pennsylvania.

== Movie appearances ==
Schefter had a cameo appearance in the 2005 movie The Longest Yard.

== Personal life ==
In 2007, Schefter married Sharri Maio, eleven months after meeting her on a blind date. Schefter had been married once before, but it ended in divorce; Sharri's prior husband, Joe Maio, had been killed at the World Trade Center in the 9/11 attacks. Sharri brought Devon, her son with Joe who was born in the year 2000, into the marriage with Schefter. Schefter and Sharri have a daughter together named Dylan. Schefter's book about his wife's first husband and his own experience joining the family after Joe's death, titled The Man I Never Met, was released in 2018.

== Publications ==
- The Man I Never Met: A Memoir, ISBN 1250161894, September 2018
- Romo: My Life on the Edge: Living Dreams and Slaying Dragons, ISBN 0-06-075863-5, with Bill Romanowski, 2005
- "Real Sports Reporting" Edited by Abraham Aamidor, 2003 (Chapter on football)
- Think Like A Champion: Building Success One Victory at a Time, ISBN 0-06-662039-2, with Mike Shanahan, September 1999
- TD: Dreams in Motion: The Memoirs of the Denver Broncos' Terrell Davis, ISBN 0-06-019282-8, with Terrell Davis, September 1998
- The Class of Football: Words of Hard-Earned Wisdom from Legends of the Gridiron
