= Pardon the Interruption =

American sports television show

- Starring: Tony Kornheiser; Michael Wilbon; Tony Reali (2001–2014)
- Country of origin: United States
- No. of episodes: 3,000+

Production
- Production locations: Atlantic Video Washington, D.C. (2001–2010); ABC News Washington Bureau (2010–present); Washington, D.C., Tony Kornheiser's house (2020–present)
- Running time: 30 minutes + ≈3 minutes (SportsCenter segment)

Original release
- Network: ESPN
- Release: October 22, 2001 – present

Related
- The Sports Reporters; Around the Horn

Pardon the Interruption (abbreviated PTI) is an American sports talk television show that airs weekdays primarily on ESPN but can air on various TV channels in the event of live sports or breaking news. It has been hosted by Tony Kornheiser and Michael Wilbon since the beginning. They discuss and debate the top stories of that particular day in "sports... and other stuff" (as Kornheiser put it in the show's original promo).

Similar in format to Gene Siskel and Roger Ebert's At the Movies, PTI is known for its playful banter between the cohosts, humorous and often loud tone, and a "rundown" graphic which lists the topics yet to be discussed on the right-hand side of the screen. The show's popularity has led to the creation of similar shows on ESPN and similar segments on other series, and the rundown graphic has since been implemented on the morning editions of SportsCenter, among many imitators.

== History ==
The show began in 2001, and has emanated from Washington, D.C. since its debut, as both Kornheiser and Wilbon were writing for The Washington Post at the time. In addition, both men appeared frequently on ESPN's Sunday-morning discussion program The Sports Reporters. The pair's frequent arguments during their time at the Post are often cited (including by Wilbon himself) as both the antecedent and inspiration for PTI.

The founding production team behind PTI includes Mark Shapiro, Erik Rydholm, Todd Mason, James Cohen, and Joseph Maar. The original deal was for two years with an option for a third. Originally, the show also aired Sunday evening, but this stint was short-lived.

Originally produced at Atlantic Video's facilities in Washington, the show now occupies space at ABC News' Washington bureau. Voice actress Kat Cressida lends her voice to commercial bumpers for the series and has since its premiere. From the premiere of PTI until September 5, 2014, Tony Reali served as the show's statistician (earning him the nickname "Stat Boy") and eventually became a de facto co-host. Reali became the host of Around the Horn in 2004, but remained on PTI until 2014, when he relocated to New York City to work on Good Morning America while continuing as host of ATH.

Kornheiser began exclusively hosting from his home upon the show's return from its 2020 COVID-19 hiatus (during part of which he and Wilbon had short video-call segments that appeared on SportsCenter under the altered title Pardon The Isolation). He made his first in-studio return on December 5, 2023. Despite cautioning viewers "Don't get used to it" at the time, he did make future appearances sporadically, and as of 2026 generally appears in-studio once or twice a week.

The show won a Sports Emmy Award for Outstanding Studio Show in 2009, 2016, and 2019.

== Broadcast details ==
PTI airs at 5:30 p.m. Eastern Time on ESPN, occasionally moving to ESPN2 in the event of live sports or breaking news coverage airing on the main channel. Replays also appear on ESPN2 or ESPNEWS at various times.

In Canada, TSN airs the show live at 5:30 p.m. ET. In 2011, the SportsCentre edition following PTI now features the final segment, but previously TSN did not air it. Tony acknowledged this frequently at the end of the show, often signing off while waving a Canadian flag.

Since April 17, 2006, ESPN has also offered a free audio podcast which cuts out commercials and includes all segments. The podcast is usually made available two to three hours after its original telecast on ESPN.

=== Viewers ===
PTI averages a little more than one million viewers daily.

Famous fans include Barack Obama, George W. Bush, Tom Hanks, Bill Murray, David Letterman, Tom Cotton, Hank Azaria, Chris Christie, Eric Stonestreet, Matthew Morrison, John Heilemann, Penny Marshall, Michael Kelly, Eva Longoria, John McCain, Tim Russert, and Maury Povich.

The October 24, 2011 episode featured a message from then-President Obama commemorating the tenth anniversary of the show. On July 12, 2013, Kornheiser, Wilbon, and Reali were guests at the White House. After lunch, the trio met in the Oval Office with Obama. Obama also provided taped congratulations on the show's 20th anniversary episode on October 22, 2021.

== The set ==
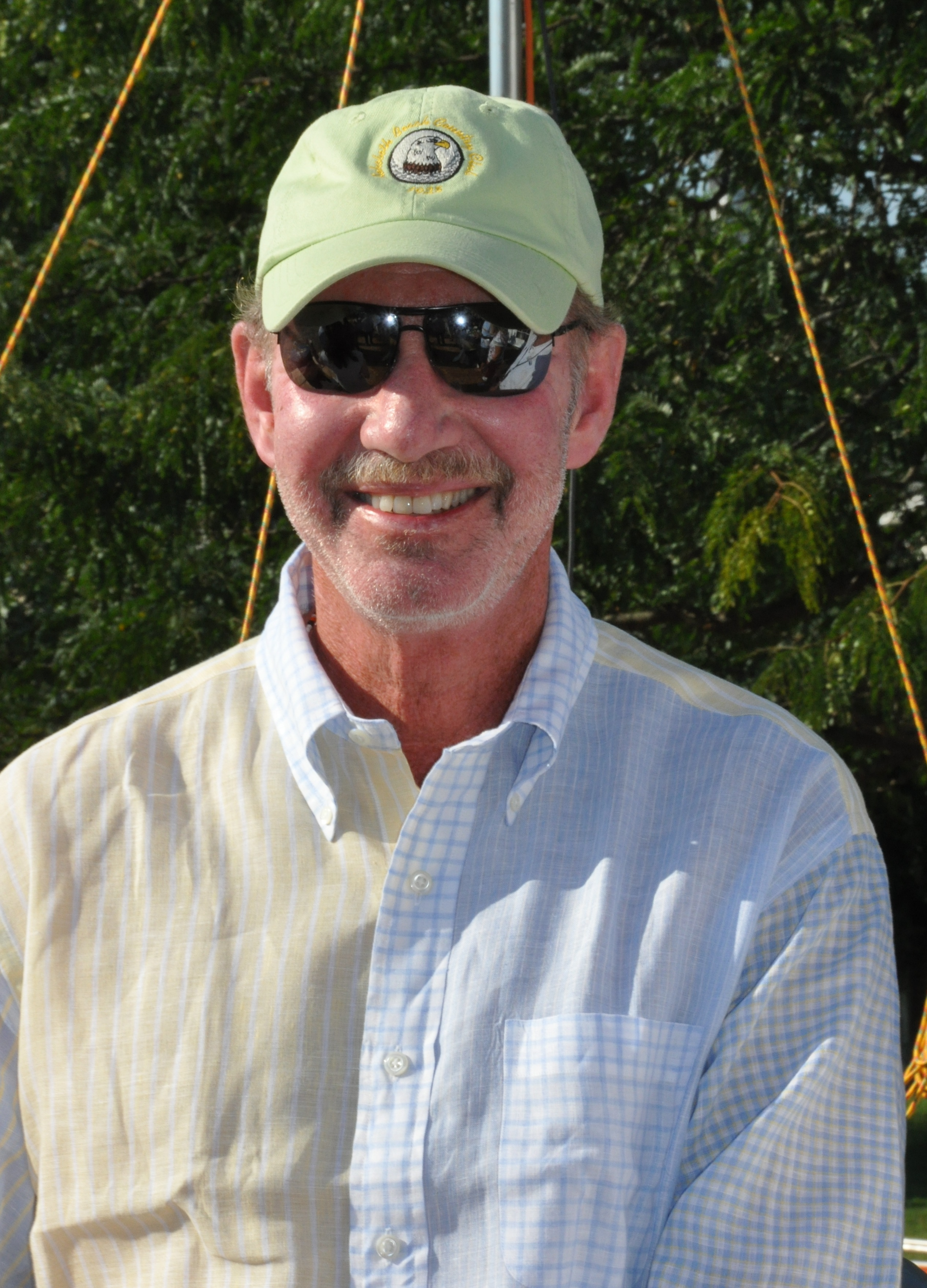
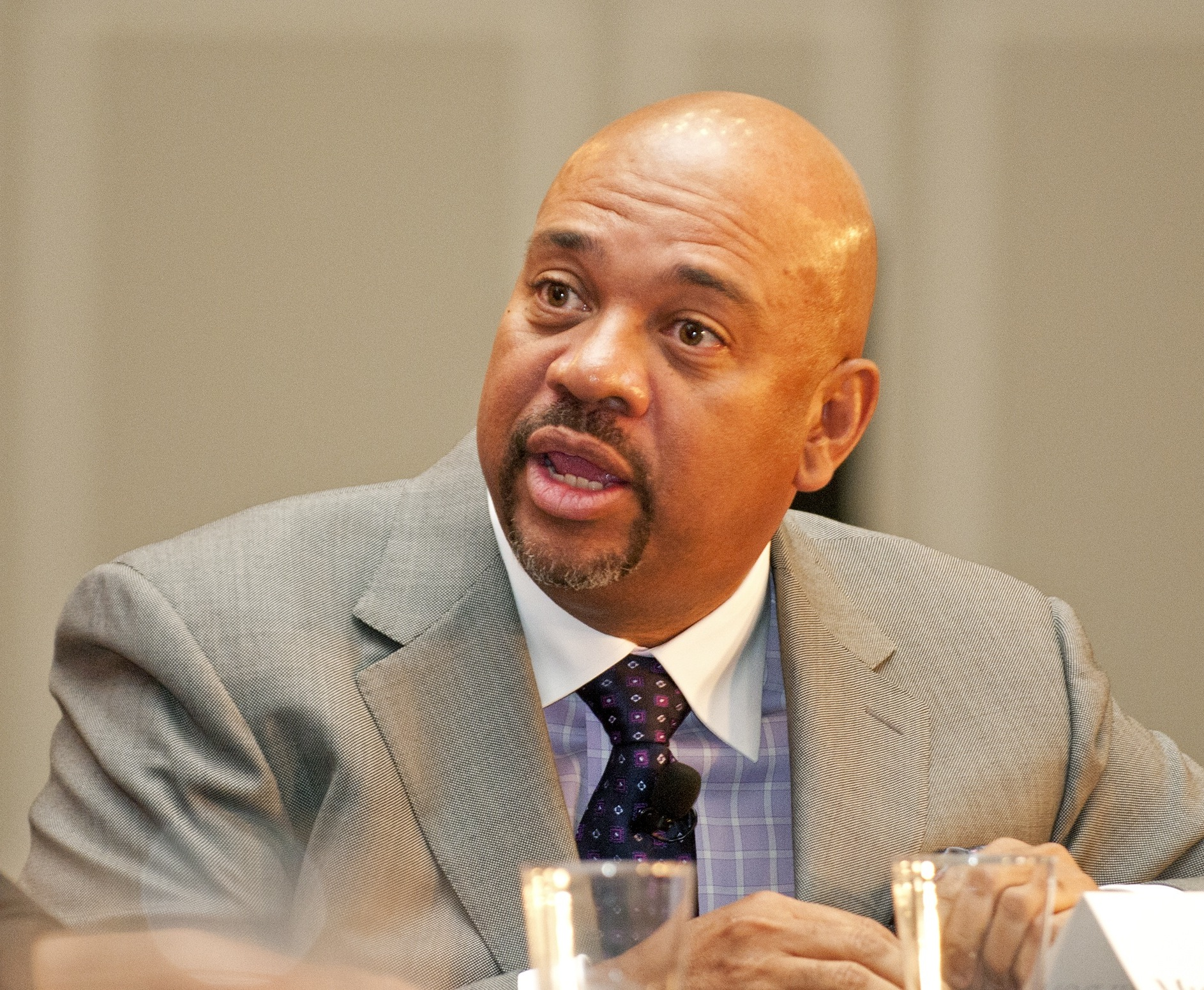
Tony Kornheiser (left) and Wilbon, the show's hosts.

For much of its run PTI had a unique studio layout featuring a "wall" full of cut-out cardboard heads of athletes and celebrities that had been used in the "Role Play" segment, bobblehead dolls of the show's hosts and Reali, Etch-A-Sketch art of Kornheiser and Wilbon, multiple penguins and several other toys and trinkets they have received, such as Kornheiser's beloved "Leg Lamp" from A Christmas Story, Stewie Griffin, and Elmo.

For different American holidays, the set would be decorated with other props to match the theme of the day. For example, on Halloween, carved jack-o'-lanterns of the host's heads are also present. The color of the rundown graphic is also changed to fit with the holiday theme (e.g. red, white, and blue to represent Independence Day, green for St. Patricks Day, red and green for Christmas).

On September 27, 2010, Pardon the Interruption and Around the Horn began broadcasting in high definition and moved from the Atlantic Video Washington complex to facilities in the ABC News Washington bureau, where high definition sets were built for both shows.

On January 20, 2020, the current set for PTI debuted. This was the first major upgrade to the PTI set in nearly a decade.

== Segments ==
PTI is divided into three segments. The first involves the hosts discussing and debating sports news Headlines (generally, three topics are covered, each receiving 2–4 minutes, in earlier days, more topics were covered with less time assigned to each). The second segment will either consist of a themed game segment that allows for discussion for further topics, or 5 Good Minutes, an interview with a guest. The third segment consists of Happy Time, an acknowledgment of any "errors & omissions" from earlier segments, and finally the Big Finish, a high-speed, back-and-forth rundown of more sports topics of note.

For much of its history, the show aired in four shorter segments, allowing for the inclusion of both a game and an interview, or occasionally, a second segment of "Headlines" replacing one of the two. A wider variety of games were played during the time Reali was present on the show, as he would frequently serve as in-studio host/moderator/judge.

In the show's earliest days, it was not unusual for the last point or topic in each section to be about a non-sports-related pop-culture event, but those have been eliminated.

On rare occasions, the show will stray from its basic format, such as on August 9, 2005, when baseball commissioner Bud Selig was the guest at the very top of the show for an extended interview.

=== Introduction/Headlines ===
Kornheiser and Wilbon welcome viewers to the show with opening banter. Wilbon usually opens the show with the line, "Pardon the Interruption... but I'm Mike Wilbon," and then put a question to Kornheiser concerning one of the day's sports or pop culture issues; Kornheiser will then introduce himself and answer Wilbon's query in a sarcastic manner, and the two will then continue a conversation while the opening title card is shown. The theme song (as well as the commercial outro music) thematically references the song "Cut Your Hair" by Pavement. Kornheiser then says "Welcome to 'PTI', boys and girls", and gives a brief introduction before beginning discussion on the show's first topic.

(On rare occasions when more serious news will lead the discussion, such as the death of Junior Seau, the hosts will omit their typical intro banter.)

During the course of this segment, Wilbon and Kornheiser will alternate topic introductions up for debate. Each topic is listed in chronological order on the right side of the screen, and a countdown timer is shown indicating how much time is allotted to discuss a particular topic; however, the hosts usually go over the time limit in order to make their final points.

=== Five Good Minutes ===
Kornheiser and Wilbon interview a sports figure, writer, or analyst typically for a period of time from three to six minutes. The interview itself is actually recorded prior to the rest of the show and then trimmed down for broadcast. According to PTI's remote producer, with some exceptions, guests are booked the day of the show as they try to obtain the most relevant news of the day. Other times, there are two "Five Good Minutes" segments with two different guests, there are also shows where two related guests appear during one segment, such as Joe Buck and Tim McCarver of Major League Baseball on Fox broadcasts (Another example of this was Al Michaels and Doc Rivers, when they appeared together while covering the 2004 NBA Finals for ABC Sports). There have also been occasions where Kornheiser or Wilbon, while on vacation or in another city to cover an event and not hosting the show, have been the subject of "Five Good Minutes" themselves.

Guests almost always appear from a separate location, usually the site of an upcoming game or their home city, appearing with the hosts via split screen. On a few occasions, the guest has appeared in studio with Kornheiser and Wilbon. This may be the case if the guest is an athlete or coach in Washington to play a game that night, such as when Denver Nuggets guard Chauncey Billups appeared on February 6, 2009, prior to a game against the Washington Wizards. When this happens, the guest will sit on Wilbon's side of the table, sitting diagonally from Kornheiser.

ESPN analyst Ron Jaworski, a former Philadelphia Eagles quarterback (a.k.a. "Jaws" and "the Polish Rifle" - the latter usually rendered in a Howard Cosell-like voice), had a long stint as a regular 5GQ guest - originally on Mondays, later on Thursdays), until his departure from ESPN.

On rare occasions, "Five Good Minutes" runs especially long, such as on June 8, 2005, when NFL agent Drew Rosenhaus's interview ran 11 minutes, forcing the cancellation of the following segment (Role Play), on March 23, 2007, when USC basketball coach Tim Floyd's interview ran 9 minutes as he talked about O. J. Mayo, and on October 22, 2009, as reporter Jackie MacMullan discussed the Magic Johnson/Isiah Thomas controversy, forcing the cancellation of the segment Report Card.

As of 2026, frequently recurring guests include Troy Aikman, Jay Bilas, Kendrick Perkins, P.K. Subban, and Steve Young.

On occasions during the show's three-segment format, a separate game is played in lieu of an interview segment.

=== "Game" segments ===
PTI uses a variety of different game-themed segments to talk about other sports news and make predictions. Many games have been played over the years, but as of 2021, four remain in the regular rotation:

- Mail Time: the hosts read and respond to viewer e-mail that they take out of a talking mailbox. Early in PTI's run, an intern named Josh read the mail to the hosts. When the show changed over to the talking mailbox, Wilbon would express disgust at the mail voice, demanding it be omitted. The mail read on air is no longer written by viewers, but rather staff of the show itself.
- Toss Up: the two hosts choose between two sides of a topic announced by the producer, Erik Rydholm, over the loudspeaker, and Kornheiser always claims to be the winner.
- What's the Word? Introduced in 2009. Reali (later Rydholm) read a partial sentence and the hosts each offer an adjective to fill the blank(s) in the sentence. The game often involves made up or hyphenated words, and usually ends with Kornheiser using an adjective to aggrandize himself or berate Wilbon, such as saying he won with a "Korn-ucopia" of words, or that Wilbon "got Wil-bombed."
- Psychic Hotline sees the hosts answer questions read by staffers, presented as emanating from an on-set crystal ball. Kornheiser dons a stereotypical fortune-teller costume.

In addition, on the last show before Thanksgiving, the game segment is usually reserved for the hosts to reveal their choices for Turkeys of the Year, usually people during the last year that have usually done notably stupid acts un-befitting of sport (funny or unfunny). As noted by Wilbon at the beginning of the segment, there are no criteria for the selection process, meaning anyone they see fit is eligible. Over the years, the list has vastly expanded from five to numerous candidates being named during the segment.

Among games no longer regularly played:

- Odds Makers, which is featured weekly and involves the hosts giving their prediction in the form of a percentage about the likeliness of a future event occurring. Reali gives the topics and keeps track of responses on a chalkboard, to which he refers at the end of the segment in order to declare a winner. A selection at either extreme of 100% or 0% is well-respected, with the latter being coined by Reali as "squadoosh." Kornheiser often gets his odds to add up to a certain number or form a pattern. "Odds Makers" is also noted for its feud between Reali and guest host Dan LeBatard, who is often accused of ruining the game.
- Role Play, featured fairly often but less so than earlier in PTI's run, is referred to as "Heads on Sticks" because the hosts alternate speaking as a sports figure with the person's picture on a stick in front of their faces. After a picture is used, it is usually stuck somewhere in the background of the set until it is replaced. The crude connotation of this title has been highlighted as a suggestive musical cue leads the segment.
- "Over/Under", is a segment that alternated weeks with Odds Makers when they were first introduced, but is now featured only occasionally. The hosts argue over whether a certain sports figure or team will go over or under a certain number (e.g. 40 home runs, 60 wins). Reali also announces the topics for this segment, holding cards up with the statistic, as well. In order to help prevent a "push" (a Wilbon trademark), a decimal figure is sometimes used (e.g. 2.5 touchdowns).
- "Report Card", saw the hosts assign letter grades to various events suggested by "Professor" Reali. Usually, Kornheiser's name is spelled "Tiny" instead of "Tony" on the Report Card board.
- In Good Cop, Bad Cop, both hosts dress in police hats and sometimes sunglasses. This segment is featured rarely, and unlike Toss Up, the hosts must take an opposite stand on each topic, saying it is either good or bad. This segment is occasionally renamed "Good Elf, Bad Elf" for the holiday.

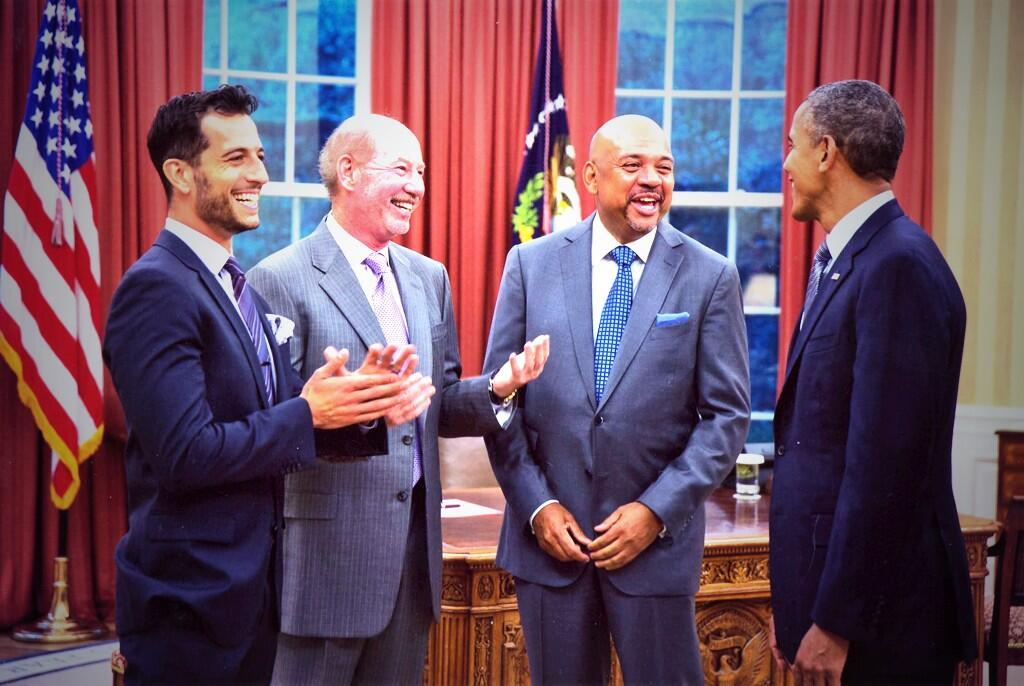
Tony Kornheiser, Michael Wilbon and Tony Reali meeting President Barack Obama.

- "Food Chain," where the hosts rank a top five list of teams, returned in December 2008 after a long absence. Kornheiser and Wilbon usually have variations in their lists, with Wilbon posting his as each team is introduced. Wilbon refers to his as "A real man's board!," but when Kornheiser switches to his, he claims, "That's it! That's the list!" Another early segment was called "Love Em or Leave Em" where a female voice cooing "Ooo La-La!" was played before the hosts discussed an individual (whose head was on a stick) they were either "leaving" or "loving" and keeping on their side. A third rare segment is "Fair or Foul," it was introduced on February 28, 2007, after the hosts began repeating the words "fair or foul" for a few episodes because of a viewer email including them earlier in the week. The hosts discuss a variety of topics and decide if each is fair or foul (acceptable or not). If a host believes a topic is "foul," he could threw a yellow football penalty flag and/or blow a whistle.
- Additionally, during the early run of PTI, a "Doctors" segment was featured occasionally, in which the hosts had to choose which head to cut off and throw in the trash out of two that were stuck together. The hosts dressed up as doctors for this segment, using coats and assorted accessories.
- "Too Soon?" Reali asks the hosts if it's too soon for a certain sports situation to possibly occur. In November 2010, a new game entitled "Something or Nothing?" was created. In this game, Reali asked Tony and Mike if a recent sports event was significant (Something) or insignificant (Nothing). After both hosts gave their answers, Reali, through uncertain logic, determined who was correct. "Too Soon" and "Something or Nothing" were played rarely. (In lieu of "Something or Nothing," the hosts will occasionally base a headline debate on whether a story is "a big deal, little deal, or no deal at all").

=== Happy Time ===
The hosts send out a "Happy Birthday," a "Happy (or in some cases, Not-So-Happy) Anniversary," and a "Happy Trails" (acknowledging a firing, injury, retirement, or such). If the "Happy Trails" segment covers a death, which the hosts often refer to as a "Melancholy Trails," the background music goes silent as the hosts pay tribute to the person who died.

=== Errors and omissions ===
Any factual errors or omissions are swiftly rectified before the show plunges into its final 60–90 seconds.

=== Big Finish ===
From the start of the series until July 2005 and then again since August 2009, the show ends with the Big Finish, in which the hosts alternate quick takes on a list of roughly half a dozen final topics, usually ending with Wilbon answering which telecast of a pair posed by Kornheiser he will watch that evening, or predicting the outcome of a game to be played.

The hosts then give their standard signoffs:

Kornheiser: We're out of time, we'll try to do better next time. I'm Tony Kornheiser.

Wilbon: And I'm Mike Wilbon. Same time tomorrow (or 'Have a great weekend'), knuckleheads.

The half-hour broadcast concludes with Kornheiser waving a small Canadian flag while Wilbon mentions their podcast and pitches the show over to the SportsCenter studio.

According to Kornheiser, he first waved the flag and said "Goodnight, Canada" after an associate director told him that the additional PTI segment on SportsCenter did not air in Canada. Kornheiser made the routine into a trademark sign-off and continued even after TSN added the extra segment to its early-evening edition of SportsCentre.

If a scant few seconds remain Kornheiser will often offer up a “shout-out” during the show's final seconds, typically to friendly golf partners, a gift received from a viewer, or a plug for a restaurant or company he had recently received good service from.

=== SportsCenter segment ===
From July 25, 2005, through sometime in 2011, the format of the show was altered to merge the final part of the show with the beginning of the 6:00 p.m. ET SportsCenter.

Segment 4 would consist of Happy Time, followed by Errors, then the hosts giving shout-outs, as well as their recommendations for television viewing for the night as the last discussion segment of the show before SportsCenter. Wilbon usually chooses a sporting event, while Kornheiser will often opt for pop-culture based programming.

After the opening segment of SportsCenter (normally 10–14 minutes), PTI returned to debate an additional sports-related topic, then end with The Big Finish and the typical goodbyes.

For the re-air on ESPN2, the show would move straight to the post-SportsCenter topic after the third commercial break, skipping segment 4. According to Nielsen ratings, PTI paired with Around the Horn combined to average more viewers than SportsCenter.

During football season, Monday editions of PTI used to air in the former (30-minute) format, with no shoutouts or SportsCenter segment. Until midway through the 2008 season the show also took place at the Monday Night Football host stadium as Kornheiser was a part of the Monday broadcast team, after that Kornheiser hosted from an undisclosed location in the host city while Wilbon hosted from the PTI studios in Washington. After Kornheiser's departure from Monday Night Football after the 2008 season PTI reverted to its normal format for the 2009 football season after the first week of Monday Night Football, with Wilbon tossing to the NFL Countdown crew rather than to SportsCenter.

The show has since reverted to its original format where The Big Finish closes the show, though Kornheiser usually still offers shoutouts at the very end of the show. Wilbon and Kornheiser still have their additional debate as a part of SC, but it is no longer treated as a formal part of PTI.

== Running gags ==
The longevity and popularity of the show has led to numerous running jokes between Wilbon and Kornheiser that longtime viewers will recognize. Some of these include such gags as The Bald Brotherhood, Blowed Out, (He's) Ya Boy, Beatdown!, Strugg-a-ling, The Yanks and the Sawks!, Choking Dawgs!, The Penguin Dance, Kornheiser's I-95 Bias, The Wilbon Power Rankings, Let Me Axe You Something, Uranus, Playoffs? Playoffs?, Ya Gotta Get Low, Bulls Corner, Drew Breeees, Washington "Natinals" (purposely mispronounced as such), Good Night Canada, Ball/Puck Night!, The Lig, Tony's "Population Theory", and The Trampoline Bear.

In addition, for the first 3½ years of the show, Kornheiser only hosted a few shows away from the studio, with Wilbon during the week of Super Bowl XXXVI. Meanwhile, Wilbon has hosted many shows at the location of a sporting event he was attending. This has resulted in much teasing of Kornheiser by Wilbon, including Kornheiser's fear of flying. Finally, on March 27, 2006, Kornheiser for the first time hosted the show away from the studio while Wilbon remained back at the set, as Kornheiser was in Orlando, Florida, covering the NFL owners meetings. For the first time in November 2006, Kornheiser and Wilbon "chatted split-screen" from two different locations away from Washington, D.C.

Usually during Report Card, Tony Kornheiser's name is spelled as "Tiny" instead of "Tony." Another common gag is during games such as Report Card and Odds Makers, Dan Le Batard's name will often be Don, rather than Dan.

== PTI in other media ==
The short-lived CBS show Listen Up was based on the life of Tony Kornheiser. In it, the main characters Tony Kleinman (Jason Alexander) and Bernie Widmer (Malcolm-Jamal Warner) co-hosted an off-beat sports show titled "Listen Up!" On the day Listen Up! debuted, Warner and Alexander appeared in character on PTI's intro.

Kornheiser and Wilbon appeared as themselves on PTI in the 2004 film Mr. 3000, including doing a Role Play segment with Kornheiser posing as Stan Ross (Bernie Mac) at one point.

On February 8, 2006, it was announced that Tony Kornheiser would join Mike Tirico and Joe Theismann in the broadcast booth during Monday Night Football beginning in the 2006 NFL season. Kornheiser continued to host PTI, and Wilbon joined him on the road as they broadcast PTI each Monday from the site of the MNF game, and there has also been an extra PTI segment inserted during halftime of ESPN's Monday night games (although in 2008, Wilbon stayed in the D.C. studios, on many Mondays).

PTI was featured in EA Sports video games due to the contract between ESPN and EA. The first game to have the feature is NBA Live 07 for the Xbox 360 and the PlayStation 3.

Wilbon is a frequent guest on Kornheiser's eponymous podcast.

On October 8, 2010, South Park spoofed PTI in the Season 14 episode "Poor and Stupid." When Wilbon is on camera you can see the cut outs of their likeness in the background.

On October 30, 2010, SportsNation did their entire 1 hour show in the style of PTI. At the end of the show Tony Reali ripped the show in a 1-minute rant.

On February 18, 2012, Kick Buttowski: Suburban Daredevil featured Wilbon and Kornheiser as the local policemen with a nod to their good cop/bad cop PTI segment.

From 2011 to 2012, The Onion had a parody of PTI, "Get Out of My Face" (aka "GOOMF").

PTI was featured in the 2015 film Creed.

== Guest hosts ==
Over the history of the series, more than 30 guest hosts have stepped in whenever Kornheiser or Wilbon (or both) was absent. The current regular guest hosts are Frank Isola ("Fill-in Frank"), generally replacing Kornheiser, and Pablo Torre, generally replacing Wilbon. If both hosts are absent, Mina Kimes will generally co-host with Isola or Torre. All three were regulars on Around the Horn.

Bob Ryan of The Boston Globe, The Sports Reporters and Around the Horn, was the show's earliest regular guest host.

Dan Le Batard, of The Miami Herald and his then-ESPN Radio program, was another frequent guest-host, known for his polarizing irreverence for the format, and for punctuating his first appearance in each show with a trademark "BAM!!" (a la Emeril Lagasse). Le Batard began hosting his own daily ESPN TV show from the same production company, Highly Questionable, in 2011, but still occasionally guest-hosted PTI, until his 2021 departure from ESPN.

Around the Horn panelists J. A. Adande, Kevin Blackistone, Tim Cowlishaw, Dominique Foxworth, Israel Gutierrez, Bomani Jones, Jay Mariotti, Jackie MacMullan, Bill Plaschke Michael Smith and Clinton Yates have also all had stints as guest hosts.

Others appearing over the years include David Aldridge, Skip Bayless, Jay Bilas, Norman Chad, Mike Golic, Sally Jenkins, Max Kellerman, Tim Kurkjian, Patrick McEnroe, Rachel Nichols, Keith Olbermann, Rick Reilly, Bill Simmons, T. J. Simers, Dan Shaughnessy, Stephen A. Smith, Michele Tafoya, Mike Tirico, Taylor Twellman, Bob Valvano, Ralph Wiley and Jason Whitlock.

Kornheiser was absent more than usual during Summer 2006 for medical reasons. During a phone interview on the August 15, 2006, edition of The Dan Patrick Show, Kornheiser explained this absence in most of July by revealing that he was recovering from skin cancer surgery.

== Influence ==
Multiple commentators have credited PTI with inspiring and laying the groundwork for a number of successful TV sports debate shows, including Around the Horn and First Take.

== Cast ==
- Tony Kornheiser (2001–present)
- Michael Wilbon (2001–present)
- Tony Reali (2001–2014)

== Other versions ==
Starting in the 2006 NFL season, Kornheiser and Wilbon began hosting PTI from the stadium that was hosting the Monday Night Football game. The following season, they began staging a live 3-topic, 3-minute version of the show during halftime of the game.

In 2004, Crackerjack Television started producing an Australian version of the show, which airs weekly on the Australian ESPN channel and features former Australian Rules footballer Sam Kekovich and radio and television broadcaster Russell Barwick. ESPN Australia also broadcasts the American version of PTI editions before SportsCenter.

In August 2010, ESPN's British channel (now BT Sport ESPN) debuted a British version of PTI. The show was hosted by Mark Chapman and Steve Bunce.

The ESPN Deportes show Cronómetro (Spanish for "stopwatch") is modeled after PTI and Sports Reporters, in that it features personalities talking about sports subjects for a set amount of time. Unlike PTI, there are four panelists instead of two, and segments such as Role Play are not used. Five Good Minutes is used as a discussion of one subject between the four analysts. ESPN Brasil also has a version of Cronómetro called É Rapidinho (rough translation from Portuguese: "It's Fast").

== Bibliography ==
- Rodesiler, Luke (2015). "A PTI-Inspired Pedagogy: Appropriating Sports-Talk Discussion Protocols to Facilitate Literature Study". In Eckard, Sandra (ed.). Yin and Yang in the English Classroom: Teaching with Popular Culture Texts. Lanham, MD: Rowman and Littlefield. pp. 31–48. ISBN 978-1475806885.
