= Classic Now =

American television series

Classic Now is a program that aired on ESPN Classic between August 2005 and March 31, 2006. The show was hosted by Josh Elliott from a studio in New York City rented by K2 Productions.

Classic Now mixed interviews with sportswriters and analysts on current sports topics with flashbacks of past sporting events. The show aired at 7 p.m. Eastern time Monday through Friday. This program was not as successful as other talk shows on ESPN networks like Pardon the Interruption, Around the Horn, and Cold Pizza, leading to its cancellation.
