= Jim Armstrong (sports journalist) =

American sportswriter

Jim Armstrong is a sportswriter who worked for the Denver Post. After joining the paper in 1994, he covered the Colorado Rockies, Denver Broncos, Denver Nuggets and was a columnist at his termination 2011-11-04 in a sports betting scandal. He also writes for America Online and has appeared on ESPN's Around the Horn in place of colleague Woody Paige. Previously he worked for the Memphis Commercial Appeal and the Racine Journal-Times. Armstrong has received numerous accolades including Colorado Sportswriter of the Year on three occasions.
