= Lisa Olson =

American sports journalist

Lisa Olson is an American sports journalist. Her work has been featured in the anthology, "The Best American Sports Writing". She was previously a sports columnist for the New York Daily News, and the first female sports columnist for the Sydney Morning Herald, where she covered rugby union, Australian rules football, cricket and rugby league. She also was a national columnist for AOL's FanHouse sports website, and a columnist and the first woman in Sporting News' 120-year history to write the magazine's monthly back page. Olson is a member of the Baseball Writers' Association of America and is a Hall of Fame voter. She has covered sports stories in Afghanistan, Pakistan, Japan, China, Australia, South Africa and New Zealand.

In 1990, while working at the Boston Herald, she alleged that she was sexually harassed by New England Patriots football players in the team's locker room. Olson sued the team, and the players she implicated were fined by the NFL after its own investigation. The incident is considered by many to be a watershed moment for women in sports journalism. Although Olson settled a civil suit, fans of the football team made threats on Olson's life in the aftermath. The Boston Herald offered her a transfer to Australia, where she would work for the Daily Telegraph in Sydney, which Olson accepted.

== Early life and career ==
Olson was born and raised in the metropolitan area of Phoenix, Arizona. Her family were fervent sports fans. She attended Apollo and Shadow Mountain high schools, and graduated from Northern Arizona University's journalism program in 1985. She was the sports editor of her high school and college newspapers.

After her graduation from college, she moved to the East Coast to attend graduate school, but she decided to pursue a career in sportswriting. One day, she went unannounced to see an editor of the Boston Herald and asked for a job. (She had tried to do the same thing at the Boston Globe, but could not get past security.) The Herald editor offered her a position handling horse-racing agate. She impressed her supervisors, and the paper hired her as a paid sports journalist. She was assigned to cover the Boston Bruins, the 1990 Super Bowl, and, beginning in the fall of 1990, the New England Patriots.

== Sexual harassment incident ==
Beginning in the 1970s, when increasing numbers of women sought to enter the field of sportswriting, female sportswriters faced frequent discrimination, harassment, and intimidation. Women did not get equal access to post-game locker room interviews until a federal court decision in 1978. In 1985, the NFL enacted an equal access policy of its own.

On September 17, 1990, Olson was interviewing players in the Patriots locker room on a practice day. Two Patriots had complained earlier to James Oldham, the team's director of media relations, and to Pat Sullivan, the team's general manager, that they believed Olson was, in the players' words, "a looker," someone who stood around the locker room not interviewing anyone. Sullivan observed Olson and determined that she was acting professionally, interviewing Maurice Hurst, but took no other action. Several of the players subsequently taunted her by walking naked in her presence, making vulgar comments and gestures. One player, Zeke Mowatt, "fondled his genitals" in front of her. Robert Perryman did the same while her back was turned. Others, including Michael Timpson, made jokes and egged each other on.

After Olson complained, describing the experience as a "mind rape", team owner Victor Kiam allegedly described her as a "classic bitch." (He later apologized in a newspaper ad, while denying using crude language. Later he admitted to calling her a "classy bitch.") Later, on February 4, 1991, at a male-only sports banquet in Stamford, Connecticut, Kiam told the attendees a crude joke about the incident. Referring to the United States military's use of Patriot missiles during the then-ongoing Gulf War, Kiam said to the audience: "What do the Iraqis have in common with Lisa Olson? They've both seen Patriot missiles up close." After criticism, Kiam apologized for the joke two days after he had told it.

Eventually, NFL Commissioner Paul Tagliabue ordered an investigation under the aegis of former Watergate scandal prosecutor Philip Heymann; the 60-page report concluded that Olson was "degraded and humiliated." Mowatt was fined $12,500, the other two players $5,000, and the team itself $50,000, since no management had intervened at the time or immediately following. Half the cost of the team's fine was to defray instructional materials the league could send to all teams and players, and Tagliabue wrote a letter to Kiam expressing his belief that the incident had "damaged" the league. The general manager of the team was fired. In an interview on the March 11, 2011 edition of Bill Simmons' podcast, "The B.S. Report", Jackie MacMullan reported that the fines were never actually collected from the players.

After the incident became public, Olson was subjected to harassment by fans of the Patriots. Her tires were slashed, she received hate mail and death threats, and her apartment was burglarized. The Herald's then owner, News Corporation, offered to transfer her to Sydney, Australia, where she worked for The Daily Telegraph and the Sydney Morning Herald.

On April 25, 1991, Olson filed a lawsuit in Massachusetts state court against the Patriots, Kiam, Sullivan, Oldham, and the three players (Mowatt, Timpson, and Perryman), alleging violations of her civil rights, sexual harassment, intentional infliction of emotional distress, and intentional damage to her professional reputation. On February 24, 1992, her attorney said that Olson had settled the lawsuit on undisclosed terms.

== Return to the United States ==
In 1998, Olson returned to the United States to be with her gravely ill father and took a position with the New York Daily News.

Later that year, Olson and Sam Marchiano were reportedly subjected to a profanity-laced verbal tirade by New York Yankees pitcher David Wells when they approached him at his home to comment on his sudden trade to the Toronto Blue Jays for Roger Clemens. David Cone, Wells's teammate, gave Olson and Marchiano Wells's address. Olson later wrote a column apologizing to Wells for coming to his house during what was such an emotional time.

Olson worked as a sports columnist for the Daily News for ten years. She later was a columnist for the FanHouse sports website, and then a columnist for Sporting News. As of 2013, she was working as a freelance writer.

She won numerous writing awards during her time with the Daily News, including "Best Sports Reporting" by the Society of Professional Journalists. She is a frequent guest speaker at schools and colleges, and active in public schools' mentoring program for girls who hope to study journalism.

In 2011, Northern Arizona University's School of Communication awarded Olson its Eunson Alumni Achievement Award.

In 2013, the Association for Women in Sports Media, at its 25th convention, awarded Olson its Mary Garber Pioneer Award.

== Popular culture ==
In 2013, Olson's incident with the Patriots was addressed in the documentary Let Them Wear Towels, part of ESPN Films' Nine for IX series that commemorated the 40th anniversary of the enactment of Title IX. The documentary was about female sportswriters' struggles to gain access to male locker rooms in order to be able to do their jobs. Archival footage of Olson was used in the film, but Olson herself declined to participate in it.

Olson's ordeal was mentioned (although without her name, referring to her only as "a Boston Globe reporter") in the Sports Night Season One episode "Mary Pat Shelby," in which Natalie Hurley was assaulted in a locker room by football star Christian Patrick.
