= Bill Plaschke =

American sportswriter (born 1958)

William Paul Plaschke (born September 6, 1958, in Louisville, Kentucky) is an American sports journalist who has written for the Los Angeles Times since 1987.

== Biography ==
As a child he attended St. Albert the Great Elementary School in Louisville. He then went on to attend Ballard High School. He spent his freshman year at Baylor University in Waco, Texas. In 1980, he received a bachelor's degree in mass communications from Southern Illinois University Edwardsville, where he was the sports editor for the school's paper, the Alestle. Before joining the Los Angeles Times, he worked as a reporter in Fort Lauderdale and Seattle. After joining the Times, he mainly covered the Los Angeles Dodgers. He became a columnist in 1996.

Plaschke is a member of the Baseball Writers' Association of America and the Professional Football Writers Association. He is also a regular panel member of ESPN's sports-themed debate show, Around the Horn. Fellow panelist and Denver Post columnist and author Woody Paige often refers to him as "Reverend Bill."

Plaschke has been named National Sports Columnist of the Year by the Associated Press four times.

He had a cameo in the film Ali as a sports reporter before the first fight against Sonny Liston. Plaschke also had a recurring role in the HBO series Luck.

Plaschke was the subject of controversy while serving as a correspondent for the Los Angeles Times at the 2016 Rio de Janeiro Olympics for a column that accused U.S. gymnast Gabby Douglas of a lack of patriotism for failing to smile and place her hand over her heart during the playing of the U.S. National Anthem; the column was in turn described as "a stunning display of superfluous concern-trolling," "rife with thinly-veiled racism and sexism" and attracted further widespread criticism. Douglas later tearfully apologized at a press conference even though the criticism was widely regarded as unfair. Plaschke, who had systematically criticized Douglas' demeanor during the games, stayed silent on the controversy.

Plaschke wrote about his experience with COVID-19 in the summer of 2020.

He has written two books: I Live for This!: Baseball's Last True Believer (with Tommy Lasorda) (2009), and Paradise Found: A High School Football Team’s Rise from the Ashes (2021), about how a high school football team inspired the people of Paradise, California after the town was virtually destroyed in a wildfire.
