= Kate Fagan =

American sports reporter

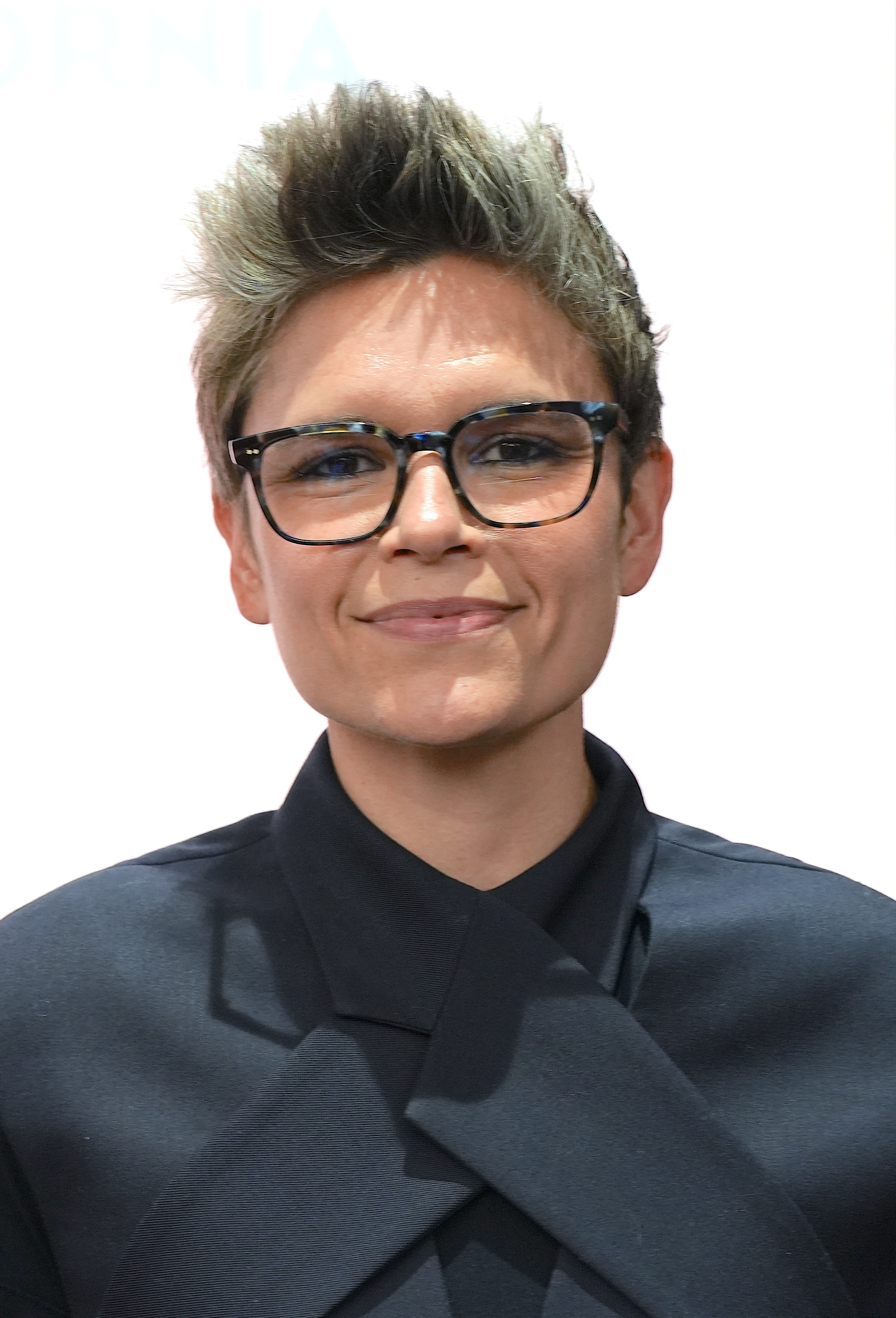
- Fagan in 2025
- Born: November 15, 1981 (age 44); Warwick, Rhode Island, U.S.
- Education: University of Colorado Boulder
- Occupation: Sports journalist
- Spouse: Kathryn Budig (m. 2018)
- Website: bykatefagan.com

Kathleen Elizabeth Fagan (born November 15, 1981) is an American sports reporter, commentator, and novelist.

She previously was employed by ESPN. Before joining the ESPN staff, she worked as the Philadelphia Inquirer's beat writer for the NBA's Philadelphia 76ers.

== Early life ==
Fagan was born in Warwick, Rhode Island. Fagan's father played professional basketball in Europe before later opening a financial investment company. Her mother worked as a sales representative for McGraw-Hill. She attended Niskayuna High School in Niskayuna, New York, where she became the school's all-time leading scorer in basketball.

Fagan attended the University of Colorado at Boulder where she lettered in basketball. After suffering a foot injury as a freshman, she rebounded to be among the team's best shooters and scorers. She set a Big 12 Conference record by making 44 consecutive free throws during the 2002-03 season and was a perennial First-Team Academic Big 12 performer. In 2004, Fagan graduated from the University of Colorado at Boulder with a Bachelor of Science in Communication. She also played two seasons with the Colorado Chill of the National Women's Basketball League (NWBL).

=== University of Colorado statistics ===
Legend
GP	Games played	GS	Games started	MPG	Minutes per game
FG%	Field goal percentage	3P%	3-point field goal percentage	FT%	Free throw percentage
RPG	Rebounds per game	APG	Assists per game	SPG	Steals per game
BPG	Blocks per game	PPG	Points per game	**Bold**	Career high

Year	Team	GP	Points	FG%	3P%	FT%	RPG	APG	SPG	BPG	PPG
1999-00	Colorado	5	15	28.6%	14.3%	100.0%	1.4	0.8	0.4	-	3.0
2000-01	Colorado	20	51	32.7%	25.0%	87.5%	0.4	0.4	0.4	-	2.6
2001-02	Colorado	**34**	172	**45.8%**	**47.6%**	62.2%	1.0	1.1	0.8	-	5.1
2002-03	Colorado	32	348	39.7%	38.7%	95.4%	3.0	1.6	0.8	0.1	10.9
2003-04	Colorado	30	**384**	42.0%	42.9%	88.7%	**3.3**	2.8	**1.2**	**0.1**	**12.8**
Career		121	970	40.9%		86.1%	2.0	1.5	0.8	0.1	8.0

== Career ==
In 2006, Fagan began her professional career as a sports editor for the Ellensburg Daily Record; the following year she moved to the Glens Falls Post-Star as a sportswriter. Later, from 2008 to 2011, she was on the staff of the Philadelphia Inquirer, where she was the Philadelphia 76ers beat writer.

As an ESPN writer beginning in 2012, Fagan also made regular TV appearances on Around the Horn and First Take. As of January 18, 2018, Fagan had 36 wins on Around the Horn She co-hosted The Trifecta with Spain, Jane and Kate with Sarah Spain and Jane McManus on espnW and Will and Kate with Will Cain on ESPN Radio. Fagan's piece "Owning the Middle", a profile of basketball player Brittney Griner for ESPN The Magazine, was selected for inclusion in Glenn Stout's "Notable Sports Writing of 2013". In May 2017, Fagan started a podcast on ESPN called Free Cookies, which she co-hosted with her partner, yoga instructor Kathryn Budig. Fagan left ESPN at the end of 2018.

Fagan is a regular on the 538 podcast Hot Takedown. Fagan is a lesbian and she married her wife Kathryn Budig in 2018.

== Works ==
In 2014, Fagan authored The Reappearing Act: Coming Out as Gay on a College Basketball Team Led by Born-Again Christians through Skyhorse Publishing. The memoir chronicles Fagan's experiences on the Colorado women's basketball team.

Her second book, What Made Maddy Run, about Madison Holleran, a University of Pennsylvania track and field athlete who took her own life in 2014, was released on August 1, 2017. Her book delves into the pressure young women face in regards to social media, specifically Instagram. She brings to light the disparities between Holleran's depressive reality, and the fun and filtered photos that she posted on Instagram.

Her novel, The Three Lives of Cate Kay, debuted on January 7, 2025. It was chosen as Reese's Book Club's January 2025 pick.
