= Jay Mariotti =

American sports journalist and commentator

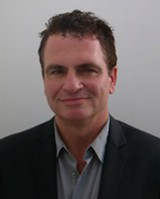
- Born: June 22, 1959 (age 67); Pittsburgh, Pennsylvania, U.S.
- Occupations: Sports journalist; Podcaster
- Known for: Former Around the Horn panelist and Chicago Sun-Times columnist
- Website: www.jaymariotti.com

Jay Mariotti (/ˌmæriˈɒti/ MARR-ee-OT-ee; born June 22, 1959) is an American sports journalist and commentator who currently hosts the sports-related podcast Unmuted. He previously spent 17 years as a Chicago Sun-Times columnist and eight years as a regular panelist on the ESPN sports-talk program Around the Horn.

== Early life and education ==
Mariotti was born on June 22, 1959, in Pittsburgh, Pennsylvania. He grew up in suburban Pittsburgh. After high school, he attended Ohio University, where he was the sports editor on the school's newspaper.

== Career ==
After leaving Ohio University, Mariotti earned a job as a feature writer for The Detroit News. He stayed at that newspaper for 4 years before taking a job as a sports columnist for The Cincinnati Post in 1985. He later moved to Denver where he was a columnist for both the Rocky Mountain News and The Denver Post. While in Denver, he also hosted a sports talk radio show on KBX. In 1990, he joined The National Sports Daily as a columnist based in Detroit and, later, New York City. The publication folded in 1991, and Mariotti became a columnist for the Chicago Sun-Times later that year.

He would go on to spend 17 years as a columnist at the Sun-Times. During his tenure there, he also hosted several radio shows including one in the late 1990s that was syndicated through the One on One Sports network and another in 2004 on Chicago's WMVP. He left the latter position after 10 months after refusing to comply with the station's request that he minimize his criticism of the Chicago White Sox and the Chicago Bulls. Starting in 2002, he became a regular panelist on the ESPN sports talk show, Around the Horn. He also made occasional appearances on another ESPN program, Pardon the Interruption.

During his time in Chicago, Mariotti was occasionally the subject of controversy for his often highly critical language. One notable case occurred in 2006 when Chicago White Sox manager, Ozzie Guillén, directed a "profanity-laced tirade" toward Mariotti after he had been critical of Guillén's management of relief pitcher, Sean Tracey. In August 2008, Mariotti left the Chicago Sun-Times, citing his belief that newspapers would soon become obsolete with news coverage primarily coming from websites.

In January 2009, he joined AOL's FanHouse website as a columnist. On September 30, 2010, Mariotti pleaded no contest to a misdemeanor battery count connected to an August 21 arrest in Los Angeles for alleged domestic violence involving his girlfriend. In August 2010, Mariotti was suspended from AOL's FanHouse and stopped appearing on Around the Horn or any other ESPN properties. Mariotti has since maintained his innocence, stating that he pleaded no contest only to avoid the costs of a trial. Some charges against him were expunged in 2013.

In March 2015, he was hired as the sports director for The San Francisco Examiner. In that position, he wrote 4 to 5 columns per week for the paper. Mariotti left the Examiner after a year in March 2016. In December 2016, Mariotti started a podcast called Unmuted with his former Around the Horn panelist, Woody Paige. Mariotti continues to host the show, although Paige is no longer a co-host.
