= Dan Shanoff =

American sportswriter

Dan Shanoff is an American sportswriter, currently working at The Athletic. He rose to fame writing for ESPN.com's Page2 section, where every weekday morning between January 6, 2003, and August 31, 2006, he put out a "Daily Quickie" article, in which he discussed the important sports happenings from the previous day and those due to be played in the immediate future. One of Shanoff signature traits in his writing is his love of 'Instant History,' meaning that whatever took place yesterday in sports is generally the most important thing to ever happen. In June 2003, months after starting on ESPN.com, Shanoff was a panelist on the network's show Around the Horn. He would make five appearances overall in the series until August 2004, the most without never winning a discussion. On January 14, 2008, Shanoff moved his blog to the Sporting News Blog under the moniker of "The Wake-Up Call." On July 20, 2010, the Sporting Blog was discontinued. He graduated from Northwestern University and Harvard Business School.

== Daily Quickie ==
In addition to the "Daily Quickie" article, Shanoff ran a daily chat from 9am-10am Eastern Time called the Morning Quickie (or MQ). On August 31, 2006, he posted the final Daily Quickie column and retired the Morning Quickie chat. On September 1, 2006, he started a new blog site on Blogspot, where he continues to provide analysis of sporting events.
