= Frank Isola (sportswriter) =

American sportswriter

Frank Isola is an American sportswriter who covered the New York Knicks and the National Basketball Association for the New York Daily News from 1996 until 2018. He currently works for ESPN and appears on the network's shows Around the Horn and Pardon the Interruption. He is also one of the hosts of "The Starting Lineup" on SiriusXM NBA Radio.

He appears on broadcasts of Brooklyn Nets basketball games as a studio analyst on the YES Network He also worked briefly for The Athletic as a senior writer before taking a full-time position at ESPN. Isola received an APSE sports writing award in 1998 and was voted New York Sportswriter of the Year in 2015. He also received a New York Emmy Award in 2009-10 for his work on and SportsNet New York (SNY).

Isola is a graduate of the University of Maryland, College Park, where he was a walk-on member of the men's soccer team, as well as a brother of the Eta chapter of Phi Sigma Kappa. He is married to his wife Tonja and has two children. They reside in Upper Montclair, N.J. Tonja was inducted into the Manhattan College Hall of Fame for track & field. He has a son, Liam, who attended Northwestern, and a daughter, Gabby, who played for the Villanova Wildcats Women's Soccer Team. She is now a graduate assistant for the Ohio University women's soccer team.
