= Tony Reali =

American sports personality and television host (born 1978)

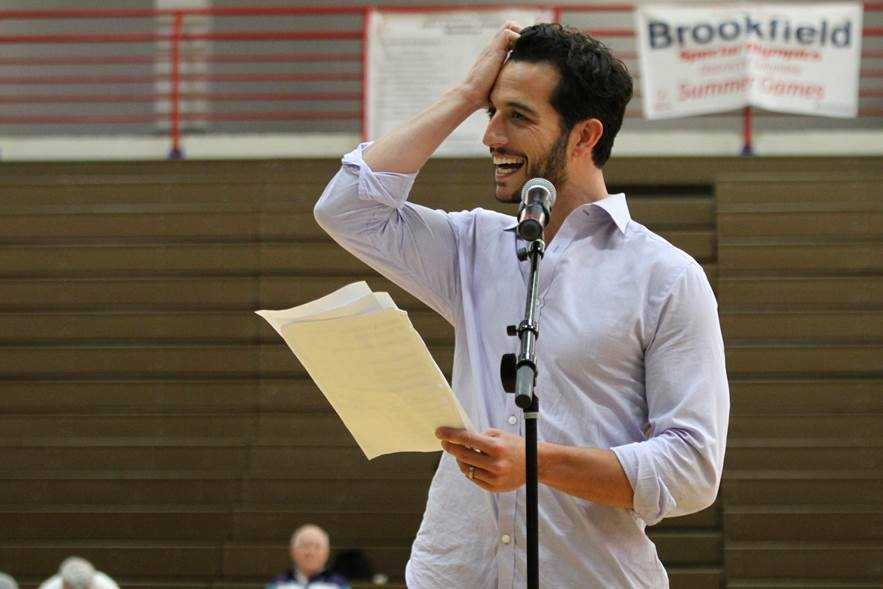
- Reali in May 2013
- Born: July 4, 1978 (age 48); New York City, U.S.
- Education: Fordham University (BA)
- Occupation: Sports talk show host
- Years active: 1997–present
- Children: 3

Antonio Giuseppe Paolo Reali (born July 4, 1978) is an American sports personality and television host. He was most recently the host of Around the Horn on ESPN, a sports panel show, from 2004 to the show's end in 2025. He served as the statistician on Pardon the Interruption from the show's debut in 2001 until late 2014. In April 2014, it was announced he would be a contributor on social media for Good Morning America, which he began on October 8, 2014, and worked for the show on different roles through 2018.

== Early years ==
Reali was born in the New York City borough of Staten Island, and is of Italian-American descent. Reali spent most of his childhood living in New Jersey, growing up in Marlboro Township. He graduated from Christian Brothers Academy in Lincroft, New Jersey in 1996. He earned a Bachelor of Arts degree in both Communications and History from Fordham University. While there, he was a sportscaster for WFUV from 1997 to 2000 as the voice of football and men's basketball. He also was a beat reporter covering the Yankees, Mets, Giants, and Jets. In May 2000, he wrote for WPIX-TV of New York.

== Broadcasting career ==
Reali joined ESPN in 2000 as a researcher and writer for 2 Minute Drill.

=== Pardon the Interruption ===
He joined Pardon the Interruption in October 2001 as "Stat Boy", where his role was to correct and fact-check hosts Tony Kornheiser and Michael Wilbon at the end of every episode. Reali became so popular that he started appearing daily on Tony Kornheiser's radio show for a daily segment called "Preview the Interruption", in which he discussed what was going to happen on PTI later on that afternoon. After Reali became the host of Around the Horn and his popularity continued to rise, Kornheiser and Wilbon eventually started introducing him by his actual name instead of simply calling him "Stat Boy." On occasion, Kornheiser will add several ridiculous middle names when introducing him to poke fun at his long name (such as Anthony Joseph Lisa Lipps Reali). In addition to conducting his usual fact-checks, Reali also judged Kornheiser and Wilbon when they played the games "Oddsmakers" and "Report Card" on the show and introduced the topics for segments such as "Over/Under" and "What's the Word." On September 5, 2014, Reali did his last show of Pardon the Interruption as part of moving to New York City to be a social media correspondent on Good Morning America, a job he held for only a couple of months.

=== Around the Horn ===
In February 2004, Reali replaced Max Kellerman as the host of ESPN's Around the Horn, the show that precedes PTI in the ESPN weekday schedule (he was guest host on Around the Horn six times, and was a panelist six other times before becoming host). As host of Around The Horn, Reali awards points at his own discretion based upon the quality of the panelists' comments. Reali is known for his in-depth knowledge of sports statistics and corrections of panelists on Around the Horn. He will deduct points or mute guests when nonsensical comments are provided, awarding points when a panelist makes a convincing argument, bold prediction, or amusing pop culture reference. During a "face time" donated to him by the winner of an episode of the show in March 2019, Reali commented on the decision of Secretary of Education Betsy DeVos to eliminate federal funding for the Special Olympics, arguing for the social and moral importance of maintaining support for the program. The following day the White House announced that it would override the proposed cuts by DeVos to the program.

=== Good Morning America ===
Reali began at ABC's Good Morning America in 2014 as its social media correspondent. From 2015 to 2018, he was the weekend sports correspondent and also worked the pop culture desk.

=== Voice roles ===
Reali appeared as a special guest star on Kick Buttowski: Suburban Daredevil and provided the voice for "The Dark One" in Rocked. The episode aired on September 22, 2012.

== Personal life ==
In the early hours of October 1, 2007, Reali's Washington, D.C. apartment was destroyed by a fire, a fact revealed by Tony Kornheiser on Pardon the Interruption on October 1 and acknowledged by Reali himself on Around the Horn the following day. The fire occurred a few days after he had proposed to Samiya Edwards, an Africa policy consultant.

Reali has been open about his struggles with anxiety, posting on social media and providing details through interviews and podcasts. He is a Catholic who has stressed the importance of his faith: "It has made me who I am, and it has got me to where I am. And it's where I am going." He was known for wearing ashes on his forehead on air every Ash Wednesday.

On Father's Day 2018, Reali announced that he and his wife were expecting twin sons. Although one of the boys died unexpectedly before childbirth, the other boy was born healthy. Reali also has two daughters.
