= FanHouse =

American sports website (2006–2011)

- Website type: Sports news and opinion blog
- Available in: English
- Successor: Sporting News
- Owner: AOL
- Founder: Jamie Mottram
- Commercial: Yes
- Registration: Optional
- Current status: Defunct (since 2011)

FanHouse was a sports website owned by AOL. Launched in September 2006, FanHouse ceased operations in 2011. During its run, the website was ranked as one of the Internet's top-10 most linked sports blogs.

== History ==
Upon its 2006 launch, it became the first sports blog to pay many sports bloggers a per-post fee.

In January 2009, FanHouse began hiring experienced print journalists, including Jay Mariotti of the Chicago Sun-Times, Kevin Blackistone of the Dallas Morning News, and Lisa Olson of the New York Daily News. FanHouse continued to bolster its roster, hiring writers away from the Orlando Sentinel, Atlanta Journal-Constitution and Contra Costa Times, among others. FanHouse kept its stable of traditional bloggers as well, including widely published Michael David Smith and Elie Seckbach.

FanHouse was managed by executive producer Randy Kim. Previous executive producers later held leadership positions at Yahoo! (Jamie Mottram), Yardbarker (Alana Nguyen) and NBC (John Clifford Ness).

== End of operations ==
In January 2011, Sporting News announced a partnership with AOL to take over editorial control of FanHouse; the site was merged into that of Sporting News, and eventually discontinued.

== Awards and recognition ==
FanHouse was ranked as one of the Internet's top-10 most linked sports blogs, as measured by aggregator BallHype, from at least April 2007 to July 2010, just four weeks before BallHype was shut down and the list was no longer updated.

At the 2008 EPPY Awards, FanHouse won for Best Sports Blog, and was named as a finalist for the award in 2009.
