= Jackie MacMullan =

American journalist (born 1960)

Jackie MacMullan Boyle
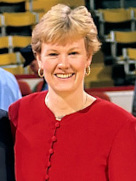
- MacMullan in 1995
- Born: October 7, 1960 (age 65); Manhasset, New York, U.S.
- Education: Westwood High School; University of New Hampshire
- Occupations: Sports columnist Author; Television Personality
- Spouse: Michael Boyle
- Children: Aly, Doug

Jackie "Mac" MacMullan Boyle (born October 7, 1960) is a retired American freelance newspaper sportswriter and NBA columnist for the sports website ESPN.com. She retired from ESPN on August 31, 2021.

MacMullan attended Westwood High School in Westwood, Massachusetts and was coached by Kathy Delaney-Smith. She started her sports journalism career at the age fifteen in order to write only about her high school's girl teams for their local newspaper. She is a graduate of the University of New Hampshire, where she played Division I basketball for the Wildcats.

In 1982, MacMullan joined The Boston Globe as a news department intern. She was a columnist and associate editor of the Boston Globe until she took a buyout from the paper in March 2008. From 1995 to 2000 she covered the NBA as a senior writer for Sports Illustrated.

In 1999, MacMullan collaborated with Larry Bird on his autobiography Bird Watching: on Playing and Coaching the Game I Love. She released Geno: In Pursuit of Perfection with Geno Auriemma in 2006, and wrote the New York Times best seller "When the Game Was Ours" with Magic Johnson and Larry Bird in 2009.

In 2011 MacMullan collaborated with NBA superstar Shaquille O'Neal to write his autobiography titled Shaq Uncut: My Story.

MacMullan has been a correspondent for several cable television networks including ESPN, CNNSI, and NESN, as well as WHDH-TV in Boston. She was a regular panelist on the ESPN program Around the Horn. She has also co-hosted episodes of the network's Pardon the Interruption.

In response to MacMullan's departure from the Globe, she had this to say in an email to the blog site Boston Sports Media Watch:

It’s just time for me. My kids are growing up too fast, and I don’t want to miss anything. I’ll still do some freelance work but I’m not planning on taking another full-time job right now. It would be counter-productive to why I’m doing this in the first place.

On May 12, 2010, MacMullan and longtime Cleveland Cavaliers radio play-by-play announcer Joe Tait received the Curt Gowdy Media Award from the Naismith Memorial Basketball Hall of Fame. The awards are presented annually to members of the print and electronic media who made a significant contribution to the game of basketball. MacMullan was the first woman to receive the honor in its 21-year history.

On May 4, 2013, in an article for ESPN, MacMullan took a controversial stance among members of the Boston media when she suggested that the Boston Celtics should part ways with team captain Paul Pierce.

In 2018, MacMullan was a co-editor with Rafe Bartholomew and Dan Klores for the oral history book "Basketball: A Love Story", based on the ESPN documentary series of the same name.

In February 2019 MacMullan was awarded the PEN/ESPN Lifetime Achievement Award for Literary Sports Writing.

In September 2020, MacMullan was hired by The Ringer to host a podcast about the NBA and appear on other podcasts on the site. In March 2022 she unveiled her podcast with The Ringer entitled Icons Club, featuring various NBA icons.

MacMullan announced her retirement from ESPN effective August 31, 2021. Her last appearance was on Around the Horn on the same day, where she had her 258th win.

Preceded by Peter May	Boston Globe Celtics beat writer 1989-1995	Succeeded by Michael Holley
