= Tony Kornheiser =

American television talk show host and sportswriter/columnist

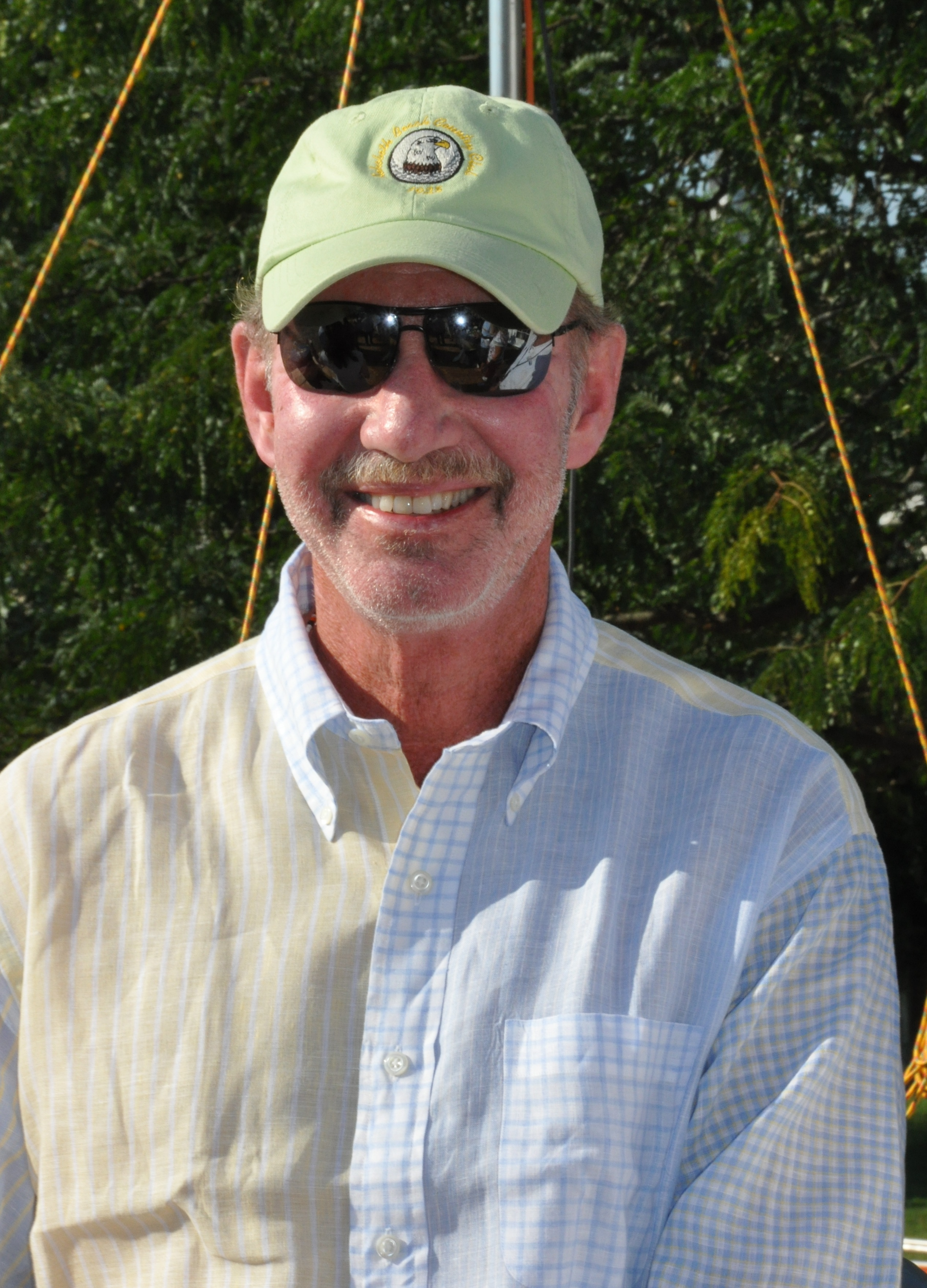
- Kornheiser in 2011
- Born: Anthony Irwin Kornheiser; July 13, 1948 (age 78); New York City, U.S.
- Occupations: Sports columnist; radio and podcast host; television host; color commentator
- Years active: 1970–present
- Spouse: Karril Kornheiser
- Children: 2
- Website: tonykornheisershow.com

Anthony Irwin Kornheiser (/ˈkɔːrnhaɪzər/; born July 13, 1948) is an American television sports talk show host, podcaster, and former sportswriter and columnist. Kornheiser is best known for his endeavors in print, television, and radio: as a writer for The Washington Post from 1979 to 2008, as a co-host of ESPN's Emmy Award-winning sports debate show Pardon the Interruption since 2001, and as the host of The Tony Kornheiser Show, a radio show and podcast. Longtime ESPN executive John Walsh once declared that "in the history of sports media, [Kornheiser] is the most multitalented person ever."

== Early life ==
Kornheiser was born in New York City and raised in nearby Lynbrook, on Long Island. He was the only child of Estelle (née Rosenthal; 1915–1978) and Ira Kornheiser (1910–2000). His father was a dress cutter. During his youth, Kornheiser spent his summers at Camp Keeyumah in Orson, Pennsylvania. One of his counselors was future NCAA and NBA basketball coach Larry Brown. Kornheiser attended George W. Hewlett High School, where he was the sports editor of the school newspaper. He graduated in 1965.

After high school, Kornheiser went to Harpur College (now Binghamton University) in New York state, where he majored in English literature and began his journalism career at the Colonial News (now called Pipe Dream). He graduated with a Bachelor of Arts in 1970. Kornheiser has frequently spoken positively of his college years. For a brief period of time after college, he worked with children with disabilities.

== Print career ==
=== Early writing career ===
Kornheiser began his career writing for the Long Island-based newspaper Newsday between 1970 and 1976. His first work at Newsday consisted of covering high school sports. Kornheiser then moved to The New York Times, where he wrote between 1976 and 1979.

In 1979, George Solomon recruited Kornheiser to join The Washington Post as a general assignment reporter in Style and Sports. In 1980, Kornheiser also authored a profile of Nolan Ryan that served as the cover story for the charter issue of Inside Sports. He became a full-time sports columnist at the Post in 1984. He also began writing columns for the Post's Style Section on November 12, 1989.

In the 1990s, Kornheiser usually wrote three columns per week: Tuesday and Thursday in the Sports Section and a more general audience column on Sunday in the Style Section. He also started working for ESPN Radio in 1997 and kept his column at the Post. As part of his ESPN Radio contract, Kornheiser wrote columns called "Parting Shots" for ESPN The Magazine between 1998 and 2000.

=== Writing style ===
Kornheiser's columns were usually sarcastic with touches of humor. He often used a self-deprecating alter ego in italics to question his points of view. At times, he would also use exaggeration for the sake of humor. According to Stephanie Mansfield of Sports Illustrated, Kornheiser was regarded by many as "the wittiest columnist" in American newspapers. Robert Weintraub of the Columbia Journalism Review praised him, in retrospect, for his "blend of beauty and precision." Kornheiser was also capable of being "deadly serious" when need be.

=== The Bandwagon columns ===
In 1991, Kornheiser created a string of now-famous Bandwagon columns to describe the Washington Redskins' Super Bowl run that year. He first came up with the idea when the Redskins trounced the Detroit Lions, 45–0, in the opening game of the season. He officially unveiled the first "Bandwagon" column when the team had an undefeated 4–0 record. From then on, the Bandwagon column appeared every Tuesday, celebrating "the fun and hilarity of sports." As the season progressed and the team's performances continued strong, a growing number of fans read the Bandwagon column in earnest.

When the Redskins advanced to Super Bowl XXVI, Kornheiser and his Post colleagues Jeanne McManus and Norman Chad drove in a 38-foot recreational vehicle decorated as the Bandwagon for a 1,200-mile journey to Minneapolis, Minnesota. Kornheiser later described the Bandwagon columns as "the most fun I ever had as a writer."

=== Late writing career ===
In the early 2000s – because of his work on both radio and Pardon the Interruption – Kornheiser stopped writing Style Section columns and only wrote one column a week. His last Style Section column was published on September 30, 2001. Three of his books – Pumping Irony, Bald as I Wanna Be, and I'm Back for More Cash – are compilations of his Style Section columns.

In 2005, Kornheiser started to write short columns called A Few Choice Words with his photo in the Post's Sports Section. These short, sports-related columns appeared on the second page of the Post's Sports section and were much shorter than the full-length columns Kornheiser used to write for the paper. This was the first time that the Post displayed a columnist's photo beside his column. He called these short columns "columnettes," writing three per week unless he had other duties. He did not write columns between April 26, 2006, and August 7, 2006, to prepare as an analyst of ESPN's Monday Night Football. Starting August 8, 2006, he wrote columns called Monday Night Diary to describe his adventures on Monday Night Football. His short-column space was later replaced by Dan Steinberg's D.C. Sports Bog.

On May 14, 2008, it was announced that Kornheiser had accepted a buyout from the Post. "I love the paper. They were great to me every day that I was there," he told Reuters. "But I don't do much for the paper anymore." Kornheiser had not written a regular column for the paper's print edition since 2006. However, Kornheiser and Wilbon continued to tape a "Talking Points" mini online TV feature for the Washington Post until June 2, 2009, when an installment termed the final one was posted on the Post's site. In it Wilbon says he thinks there will be further installments while Kornheiser seems certain it is a permanent decision management has made.

On May 20, 2010, Kornheiser said on his radio show that in fact he was fired by the Washington Post, saying "they fired me in a despicable way." On September 11, 2013, Kornheiser repeated his account: "Raju Narisetti fired me from the Washington Post and I hate his guts."

== Radio and podcast career ==
=== Radio era ===
Kornheiser hosted The Tony Kornheiser Show first locally on WTEM – known as Sports Radio 570 – in Washington, D.C. between May 25, 1992, and November 14, 1997. The Kornheiser-led show was part of WTEM's original lineup. The show was then syndicated by ESPN Radio between January 5, 1998, and March 26, 2004. He was back on WTEM locally between November 10, 2004, and April 28, 2006, after which point Kornheiser put the show on hiatus in order to prepare for his duties with Monday Night Football. His show was also carried for a short while by XM Satellite Radio, airing between February 28, 2005, and April 28, 2006.

After completing the 2006 season on Monday Night Football, Kornheiser signed with WTWP, Washington Post Radio, to relaunch his radio show on February 20, 2007. The show aired live from 8:30 a.m. to 10:30 a.m. and was then replayed from 10:30 a.m. to 12:30 p.m. XM Radio carried his show on a thirty-minute delay, from 9 a.m. to 11 a.m., beginning March 5, 2007, on XM Sports Nation, Channel 144. Kornheiser went on hiatus from the show following the June 28, 2007, broadcast because of his Monday Night Football duties. The show was hosted by David Burd and included the same supporting cast. The show was called The Tony Kornheiser Show Starring David Burd during the hiatus.

Kornheiser returned to the show as the full-time host from January 21, 2008, to June 27, 2008, after which point WWWT – the successor to WTWP – declined to renew his contract due to declining ratings. The show aired live from 8:00 a.m. to 10:00 a.m. and was replayed from 2:00 p.m. to 4:00 p.m on WWWT, as well as on XM Sports Nation, XM channel 144 from 8:15 a.m. to 10:00 a.m. He announced during this period in 2008 that he would not be back on the radio until he was done with Monday Night Football.

The Tony Kornheiser Show was on the air daily Monday through Friday from 10:00 a.m. to noon on Washington, D.C. radio station WTEM and streamed live on the station's website, ESPN980.com, until June 2016. The show was also available as a podcast. There was originally a 24-hour "podcast delay," a source of many jokes amongst fans and show members alike. The delay ended in 2015, allowing listeners to download episodes a few minutes after the live broadcast.

=== Podcast era ===
On June 2, 2016, Kornheiser announced that his show will be relaunched as a podcast-only show. According to Kornheiser, the reason to do a podcast-only show was to own his content and do the podcast a little closer to his home. However, the show format would still be the same as the radio show, albeit slightly shorter in length. Kornheiser's son, Michael, handled the social media for the podcast and launched a website with information about how to subscribe.

On September 6, 2016, Kornheiser returned from his summer vacation with the first full episode of the new podcast. The first episode was titled "We're Back!!! The Tony Kornheiser Show Returns" and ran for 1 hour and four minutes. Most parts of the old show – including "Old Guy Radio" and the Mailbag – were retained. Gary Braun and Chris Cillizza joined Kornheiser in studio. Michael Wilbon of ESPN and Steve Sands of the Golf Channel were the first guests joining by phone.

The podcast-only show is produced in partnership with sports talent agency IMG and on-demand audio company DGital Media. The podcast is available at 11 a.m. ET via iTunes, Google Play, Spotify, Stitcher, and TuneIn.

Throughout its iterations, a central quality of the show has been its eagerness to discuss issues other than sports, including news, politics, entertainment, and the idiosyncrasies of modern life. In its early years, the show amassed a large and loyal following that remains to this day. The fans – who refer to themselves as "littles" – have an annual musical convention and use "La Cheeserie" as a catch phrase (in reference to a cheese counter at D.C.-area liquor store Calvert Woodley).

== Television career ==
Kornheiser appeared on a local weekly Washington Redskins TV show during the NFL football season on Washington's Channel 50 in the early 1980s with Pete Wysocki, a popular former Redskins linebacker and local hero, which was televised from a local restaurant/bar in Washington, D.C. called "Champions."

He appeared on ESPN's The Sports Reporters beginning in 1988 and continuing during the 1990s. He sometimes guest-hosted the program when the then-host of the show, Dick Schaap, was away. He was also a panelist on Full Court Press hosted by George Michael on WRC-TV in Washington, D.C. during the NFL off-season until that show was canceled in December 2008 due to budget cuts. He also made a number of appearances on Redskins Report on WRC. He has appeared on numerous other ESPN productions, including SportsCenter, Who's Number One?, and multiple player's/sportspeople's profiles for SportsCentury.

=== Pardon the Interruption ===
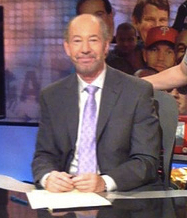
Kornhesier on PTI in 2010

Pardon the Interruption (abbreviated PTI) is a sports television show that airs weekdays on various ESPN TV channels, TSN, BT Sport ESPN, XM, and Sirius satellite radio services, and as a downloadable podcast. On PTI, Kornheiser and co-host Michael Wilbon discuss, and frequently argue over, the top stories of the day in "sports... and other stuff" (as Kornheiser put it in the show's original promo).

Kornheiser's lively segments with Wilbon on the radio and on Full Court Press – which mirrored their actual discussions in the newsroom of The Washington Post – sparked the idea for PTI well before the end of his run at ESPN Radio. The show won a Sports Emmy Award for best Daily Outstanding Studio Show in 2010, 2017, and 2019.

=== Monday Night Football ===
When Monday Night Football moved from ABC to ESPN, Kornheiser received and accepted an offer to be a color analyst on Monday Night Football in early 2006. He was originally passed over in favor of Sunday Night Football commentator Joe Theismann; however, when play-by-play man Al Michaels left ABC to call Sunday Night Football for NBC, Kornheiser was brought in alongside Theismann and new play-by-play announcer Mike Tirico. As such, Kornheiser was part of the broadcast team covering the New Orleans Saints' 23–3 victory over the Atlanta Falcons in the Saints' first game in the Superdome after Hurricane Katrina.

Unlike Wilbon, Kornheiser does most episodes of PTI in-studio due to his self-admitted fear of flying. Prior to joining MNF, his last trips outside of the studio were to cover Super Bowl XXXVI in New Orleans and to attend the NFL owners meetings in Orlando in 2006; Kornheiser both times traveled via train, though returned from the Orlando trip via airplane. On the April 6, 2006 edition of PTI, he expressed his dismay at the amount of travel required for MNF. Though he has mentioned on his radio program that he is taking steps to overcome his aviophobia, he in fact spent a five-week period on the road traveling to mainly western MNF sites, doing PTI via satellite.

Kornheiser returned for a second season of Monday Night Football. On January 9, 2007, Kornheiser told Newsday, "If they would like to have me back, my inclination is that I would like to do it again."

On May 18, 2009, ESPN announced that Kornheiser would be leaving Monday Night Football due to fear of flying. Former Oakland Raiders and Tampa Bay Buccaneers head coach Jon Gruden replaced Kornheiser in the MNF booth.

== Entertainment ==
The 2004–2005 sitcom Listen Up, which aired on CBS, was loosely based on Kornheiser's life. It featured Jason Alexander as Tony Kleinman. The sitcom's material mostly came from Kornheiser's columns (collected in I'm Back for More Cash) that he contributed to the "Style" section of the Washington Post, which took a humorous view of his family life.

Kornheiser had a cameo appearance as a bar patron in a 2015 episode of The Americans.

In June 2016, Kornheiser participated in the roast of political commentator and strategist James Carville.

== Restaurant ==
In January 2017, it was announced that Kornheiser was part of a new ownership group for Chad's (formerly Chadwick's), a bar and restaurant located in the Friendship Heights area of Washington, D.C. The group also included former Maryland basketball coach Gary Williams, TV host Maury Povich, and D.C. businessman and socialite Alan Bubes. Kornheiser is quoted as saying: "Did I always want to be part of a restaurant? No. But now with a podcast and trying to own my own content, the ability to put it on during the mornings or during the day and to have other people use it, that would be fun for me."

In April 2017, Kornheiser announced that Chad's would be renamed Chatter. The new owners made several improvements, including remodeling the interior and adding a podcast studio. Kornheiser began recording episodes of The Tony Kornheiser Show at Chatter on May 1, 2017. Many fans of the show visited the restaurant to listen live.

On June 28, 2019, Kornheiser announced that the podcast would move to a new location after the summer break due to the closure of Chatter.

== Personal life ==
Kornheiser currently resides in the Chevy Chase neighborhood of Washington, D.C., as well as Rehoboth Beach, Delaware, with his wife Karril. They have two children, Michael and Elizabeth. Kornheiser is Jewish.

Kornheiser was a member of the Young Democrats club while in high school. As of 1990, Kornheiser was a registered Republican, although he did so because his wife was a registered Democrat and the couple wanted to "receive mailings from both sides." Later, he referred to the decision to register as a Republican as a "mistake." Kornheiser voted for Barack Obama during the 2008 and 2012 presidential elections. During a podcast episode released on January 31, 2017, Kornheiser stated: "I land on the liberal side of the fence almost all the time, certainly on social issues."

Kornheiser has a pronounced fear of flying. He regularly goes to bed early. He can name all fifty U.S. states and their capitals in alphabetical order.

In 2006, Kornheiser revealed that he had skin cancer and had received treatment.

== Criticism ==
=== General ===
While earning a name as a critic of many people and organizations, he has appeared sensitive to criticism directed toward his own work.

Stephen Rodrick wrote for Slate that Kornheiser was allowed by ESPN to argue aimlessly on television and that his Washington Post column was being used to plug side projects rather than gather news from cited sources. Kornheiser called on 5 Slate, owned by the Post's parent company, to fire Rodrick.

After Kornheiser's first game on Monday Night Football, Paul Farhi wrote in The Washington Post that Kornheiser had emphasized the obvious, played third fiddle, and was reminiscent of Dennis Miller "in a bad way." Kornheiser responded during an interview on The Dan Patrick Show on August 15, 2006, saying that Farhi was a "two-bit weasel slug" and his own newspaper had back-stabbed him. His response generated more criticism from media outlets, including the Post. Other criticism came from Toronto Argonauts play-by-play commentator Mike Hogan, who said, "The thing that really bothers me is that Kornheiser doesn't seem to know his place. If you're there for comic relief, that's one thing. But for God's sake, leave the football analysis to guys who actually played the game." Former NFL offensive lineman Mike Schad also criticized Kornheiser, saying that "when people watch a game, they want to learn something. I don't need a guy who's sarcastic or trying to be funny. I love listening to Ron Jaworski on Monday Nights. He played the game and has lots of good insight and Kornheiser just gets in his way."

Mike Golic – an ESPN colleague of Kornheiser's who had expressed skepticism regarding the latter's prospects as an on-air analyst because he was never an athlete – said that Kornheiser's performance on MNF was "fine." Kornheiser's response was, "I just want to wring Golic's neck and hang him up over the back of a shower rod like a duck."

=== Controversial remarks ===
During a Monday Night Football telecast on September 15, 2008, Kornheiser made a comment about a clip of the ESPN Deportes crew's call of a Felix Jones touchdown, saying, “I took high-school Spanish, and that either means ‘nobody is going to touch him’ or ‘could you pick up my dry cleaning in the morning.’” Later in the broadcast, Kornheiser apologized on-air for the remark.

On February 23, 2010, it emerged that ESPN had suspended Kornheiser for two weeks for comments he made on his radio show about fellow high-profile ESPN personality Hannah Storm's wardrobe that day.

Hannah Storm in a horrifying, horrifying outfit today. She's got on red go-go boots and a Catholic school plaid skirt. Way too short for somebody in her 40s or maybe early 50s by now. And she's got on her typically very, very tight shirt. So she looks like she's got sausage casing wrapping around her upper body. I mean, I know she's very good, and I'm not supposed to be critical of ESPN people, so I won't ... But, Hannah Storm, come on now! Stop! What are you doing? ... [She's] what I would call a Holden Caulfield fantasy at this point.

— Tony Kornheiser

In March 2010, Kornheiser commented: "The last time I looked, the roads were made for automobiles...We're going to be dominated as if this was Beijing by hundreds of thousands of bicyclists... They all wear... my God... with the little water bottle in the back and the stupid hats and their shiny shorts. They are the same disgusting poseurs that in the middle of a snowstorm come out with cross-country skiing on your block. Run 'em down... Let them use the right, I’m okay with that. I don’t take my car and ride on the sidewalk because I understand that’s not for my car... Why do these people think that these roads were built for bicycles?... They dare you to run them down." Cyclist Lance Armstrong replied. "Disgusting, ignorant, foolish. What a complete f-ing idiot." Kornheiser later apologized to Armstrong on-air and offered to go on a bike ride with him.

In June 2010, Green Bay Packer quarterback Aaron Rodgers criticized Kornheiser's performance on Monday Night Football, saying: "He's terrible... I don’t think he’s funny. I don’t think he’s insightful. I don’t think he knows, really, anything about sports." Rodgers also criticized ESPN analyst Ron Jaworski and other ESPN employees during the interview. Kornheiser responded in an interview by saying: "If he thinks I'm no good, he wouldn't be the first. Or the last," and "I tried to establish some rapport with that. I guess that rapport didn't exist." The two have since reconciled. Kornheiser and Rodgers even played a round of golf together with Barack Obama and Mark Kelly in April 2016.

In October 2015, Kornheiser was interviewing Huffington Post editor Howard Fineman about the conservative movement in Congress when he asked if Tea Party members are "like ISIS trying to establish a caliphate here," which Fineman called a "good analogy" but without the violence.

== Honors ==
Kornheiser was a finalist for the 1997 Pulitzer Prize for Commentary.

In 2008, Kornheiser was inducted into the National Jewish Sports Hall of Fame.

In 2012, Kornheiser was ranked No. 8 in the list of the 100 most important sports talk radio hosts in America compiled by Talkers Magazine. In 2016, the Tony Kornheiser Show was ranked No. 1 as America's Top 20 Local Sports Midday Shows for 2015 by Barrett Sports Media.

In May 2017, Binghamton University – Kornheiser's alma mater – awarded him an honorary Doctor of Humane Letters.

On July 9, 2017, Kornheiser was inducted into the Washington, D.C. Sports Hall of Fame alongside such notable names as Olympic swimmer Katie Ledecky and former NFL commissioner Paul Tagliabue.

On October 4, 2017, Kornheiser and Michael Wilbon shared the National Press Club's 2017 Fourth Estate Award, which "recognizes journalists who have made significant contributions to the field."

== White House visit ==
On July 12, 2013, Kornheiser, Michael Wilbon and Tony Reali were guests at the White House. After lunch, the trio met in the Oval Office with President Barack Obama. Obama invited Kornheiser and Wilbon to play golf with him the following day, which happened to be Kornheiser's 65th birthday.

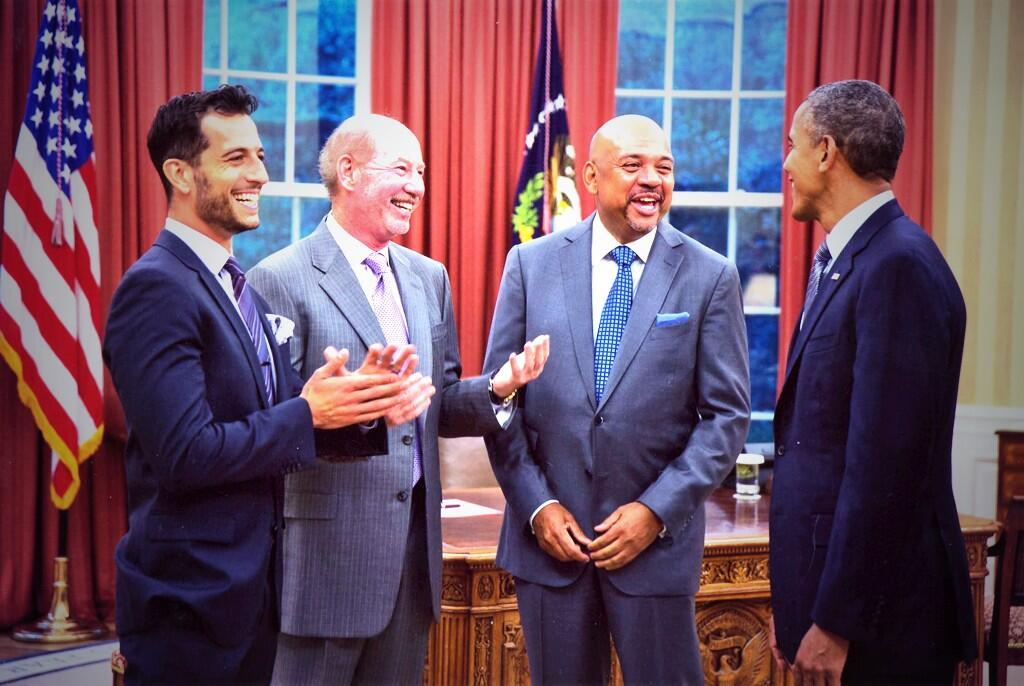
Tony Reali, Tony Kornheiser, and Michael Wilbon (left to right) meeting President Barack Obama.

Kornheiser also played golf with Obama on a number of other occasions, including in September 2013, June 2014, July 2014, July 2015, April 2016, and May 2016.

== Books ==
- Kornheiser, Tony (1983). The Baby Chase. New York: Atheneum. ISBN 0-689-11354-4.
- Kornheiser, Tony (1995). Pumping Irony: Working Out the Angst of a Lifetime. New York: Times Books. ISBN 0-8129-2474-6.
- Kornheiser, Tony (1997). Bald as I Wanna Be. New York: Villard. ISBN 0-375-50037-5.
- Kornheiser, Tony (2002). I'm Back for More Cash: A Tony Kornheiser Collection (Because You Can't Take Two Hundred Newspapers Into the Bathroom). New York: Villard. ISBN 0-375-50754-X.
