= Tim Cowlishaw =

American sportswriter (born 1955)

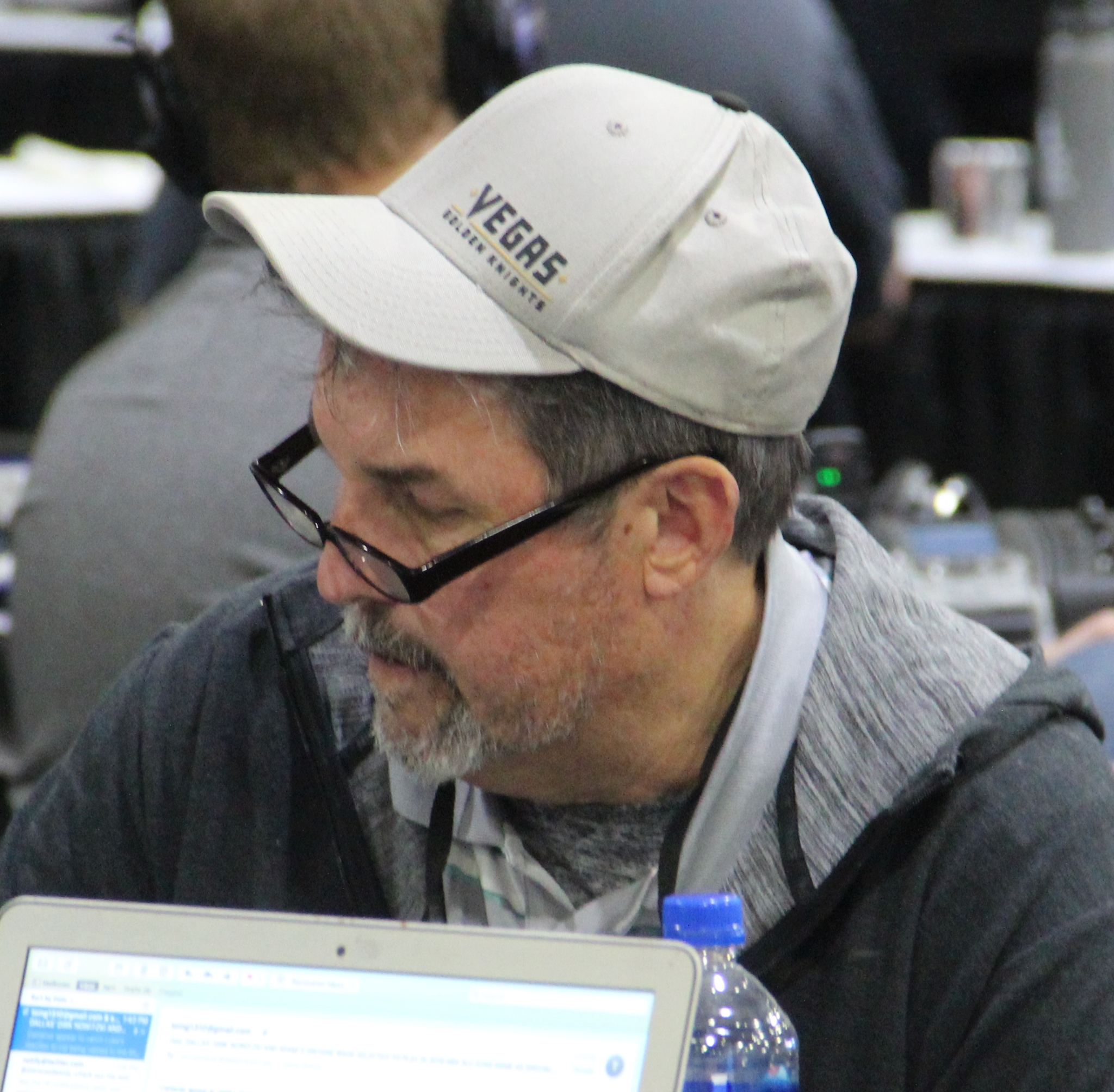
- Cowlishaw in 2019
- Born: William Timothy Cowlishaw; March 31, 1955 (age 71); Tulsa, Oklahoma, United States
- Education: University of Texas at Austin
- Occupations: Sportswriter, TV personality
- Children: 2

William Timothy Cowlishaw (/ˈkaʊlɪʃɔː/; born March 31, 1955) is an American sportswriter. He is a columnist for The Dallas Morning News and a regular panelist on the ESPN sports talk show Around the Horn.

== Career ==
Cowlishaw attended the University of Texas at Austin. He later joined the Dallas Morning News in 1989 and became the lead sports columnist for the paper in 1998. While at the Morning News, he was a beat writer for the Dallas Cowboys, Dallas Stars, and Texas Rangers. He has also covered Oklahoma Sooners football for The Daily Oklahoman and the San Francisco Giants for the San Jose Mercury News. Cowlishaw was formerly the lead reporter for the ESPN2 racing show NASCAR Now. Until 2020, he co-hosted Dennis and Cowlishaw, a late afternoon sports talk show, on Dallas radio station KESN with Steve Dennis.

In 2002, Cowlishaw was named by Associated Press Sports Editors as one of the top five sports columnists in the nation among large-circulation daily newspapers.
