= Around the Horn =

US television program

- Genre: Sports talk Panel show Debate
- Presented by: Max Kellerman (2002–2004); Tony Reali (2004–2025)
- Starring: See panelists
- Theme music composer: Umphrey's McGee (2014–2018)
- Country of origin: United States
- Original language: English
- No. of episodes: 4,953

Production
- Executive producers: James Cohen; Erik Rydholm; Mark Shapiro
- Producers: Dan Farmer; Aaron Solomon; Bill Wolff
- Running time: 30 minutes (with commercials)

Original release
- Network: ESPN
- Release: November 4, 2002 – May 23, 2025

Around the Horn (ATH) is an American sports roundtable discussion show, conducted in the style of a panel game, produced by ESPN. The show premiered on November 4, 2002, as a replacement for Unscripted with Chris Connelly, and aired daily at 5:00 p.m. ET on ESPN. The program emanated from Washington, D.C., where it was located in the same facility as Pardon the Interruption (PTI). Production still is based in Washington. The moderator for the show was Tony Reali, who hosted the program since 2004, replacing Max Kellerman, and also served as the statistician on Pardon the Interruption until the show's relocation to New York.

After ESPN announced the show's cancellation in November 2024, Around the Horn aired its final episode on May 23, 2025, concluding with 4,953 episodes over a near 23-year span.

== Broadcast history ==
Around the Horn logo from its premiere to November 2, 2018.

Around the Horn premiered on November 4, 2002. From its premiere until January 30, 2004, the show was hosted by Max Kellerman, who at the time was largely known strictly as a contributor to ESPN's Friday Night Fights. In late 2003, Kellerman announced that he would depart from the network for Fox Sports; after the show tried out several replacements, current host Tony Reali was named the permanent host on February 2, 2004, three days after Kellerman's last episode aired. As of September 23, 2019, Woody Paige has the most wins in the history of the show, with more than six hundred. Despite early negative reviews due to its now-defunct argumentative formatting, the show went on to last 23 years on the air, becoming a staple on ESPN. The show became less combative and more playful over the years, and in 2018, changed its look with augmented reality of the panel with Reali standing in an enhanced studio at ESPN's South Street Seaport studios with a continuation of the relaxed tone of the show since the mid-2010s.

The show went on hiatus from March 16, 2020 to May 8, 2020, as a result of a national emergency being declared due to the COVID-19 pandemic, which caused the suspension of sports leagues around the world. Between May 11, 2020 and July 10, 2020, Around the Horn aired for 20 minutes with commercials at 4:40 p.m. EDT as Around the Home under a new format where Tony Reali, along with three panelists, discussed sports issues from their own homes. The Around the Home format became semipermanent beginning with the July 13, 2020 episode, which saw the show expand back to its normal length. The show returned to its regular format when it returned to the studio in September 2020.

It was announced on November 20, 2024, that Around the Horn will come to an end by summer 2025. Shortly after this announcement, daily episodes were added to Disney+. On March 4, 2025, it was announced by ESPN that the final episode of Around the Horn would air on May 23, 2025.

== The set ==
The original set was in the same Atlantic Video complex as the set for Pardon the Interruption. It featured the host's desk with the point triggers and mute buttons. The judge of the show scores four panelists, that are shown on four different screens. Behind the host's desk was a map of the contiguous United States of America with the cities the sportswriters on the show appeared from. The map, divided into time zones, displayed the names of five newspapers representing each time zone. The Los Angeles Times represented the Pacific Time Zone, the Denver Post the Mountain Time Zone, the Dallas Morning News and Chicago Sun-Times both represented the Central Time Zone, and the Boston Globe represented the Eastern Time Zone. This was to create a regionally biased discussion, but this was later phased out.

When panelist Woody Paige was based in New York, the logo of Cold Pizza was added to the Eastern Time Zone side of the map as Paige also appeared on that program. Eventually, the logo of the Boston Globe was replaced by the word "Boston" as many of the contributors from Boston were no longer writing for the Globe. The map was eventually revised in this way for the other cities on the map, but the cities of other contributors were not added to the board (possibly due to a lack of space) before the map was removed. Panelists still appear from left to right as on a map of the United States, from the westernmost on the left to the easternmost on the right.

On September 27, 2010, Around the Horn and Pardon the Interruption began broadcasting in high definition and moved from the Atlantic Video complex to facilities in the ABC News Washington bureau, where high definition sets were built for both shows. In 2014, Reali relocated to New York, with a studio built in ABC's Times Square Studios. In 2018, in conjunction with the conclusion of Reali's work on Good Morning America, the show moved to ESPN's South Street Seaport Studios with an enhanced set featuring augmented reality.

Each panelist appears either in the offices of their newspaper, in front of a screen representing the city in which they are located, or in another studio. Dallas, Denver, and Los Angeles (when Bill Plaschke is appearing) still use their newspaper offices as studio space while Washington, Miami, Chicago, and Boston each have their own screens. (Los Angeles employs this as well when J.A. Adande is a panelist.) Newspaper office space is rarely used in today's iteration.

== Hosts ==
- Max Kellerman (November 4, 2002 - January 30, 2004)
- Tony Reali (February 2, 2004 – May 23, 2025)

=== Guest hosts ===
- Zachariah Selwyn (June 8, 2004 - June 11, 2004)
- Duke Castiglione (July 3, 2006 - July 5, 2006)
- Rob Stone (June 30, 2008 - July 4, 2008 and July 28, 2008 - August 1, 2008)
- Woody Paige (April 1, 2009 and April 1, 2019, both as April Fools' Day pranks)
- Pablo S. Torre (Recurring guest host from March 12, 2014 to July 14, 2017)
- Michael Smith (August 25, 2016 - August 26, 2016 and July 9, 2018 - July 26, 2018)
- Kate Fagan (August 21, 2017 - August 25, 2017, June 11, 2018 - June 15, 2018, and August 27, 2018 - August 30, 2018)
- Kevin Blackistone (June 5, 2018 - June 8, 2018)
- Clinton Yates (August 31, 2018, August 12, 2019, August 30, 2019, October 18–22, 2021, March 15–16, 2022, March 27–31, 2023, and March 25–29, 2024)
- Sarah Spain (August 13–14, 2019, August 26–29, 2019, August 28, 2020, June 24–25, 2021, October 28–29, 2021, and March 21–25, 2022)
- Frank Isola (June 18, 2021, October 25–27, 2021, January 31, 2022 - February 1, 2022, March 14, 2022, March 20–24, 2023, December 20–21, 2023, March 18–20, 2024, July 22–23, 2024, July 29–31, 2024, August 1–2, 2024, August 28, 2024, March 17–19, 2025, and April 22–23, 2025)
- Elle Duncan (April 21, 2023)
- Courtney Cronin (July 24–25, 2024, August 22–23, 2024, August 26–27, August 29, 2024, and March 24–28, 2025)

== Panelists ==
=== Final panelists ===
- J. A. Adande (Chicago): Former columnist for the Los Angeles Times and NBA reporter for ESPN. Left ESPN in August 2017 to focus full-time on his position as director of sports journalism at Northwestern University but returned in January 2018.
- Bill Barnwell (Boston): Staff writer for ESPN.com.
- Kevin Blackistone (Washington, D.C.): The Washington Post, former columnist for The Dallas Morning News.
- Kevin Clark (New York City): Host of This Is Football on ESPN radio. Former Ringer senior football writer and WSJ NFL columnist.
- Tim Cowlishaw (Dallas): The Dallas Morning News columnist and former reporter for ESPN's NASCAR coverage. Based in Dallas at the headquarters of the Morning News.
- Courtney Cronin (Chicago): Chicago Bears reporter for ESPN.
- David Dennis Jr. (Atlanta): Senior writer for ESPN.com's Andscape.
- Elle Duncan (Bristol, CT):former Sports Center 6 PM co-anchor.
- Israel Gutierrez (Miami/Ft. Lauderdale): co-host of Highly Questionable, based in Miami at ESPN's studios at the Clevelander Hotel. Background currently shows Ft. Lauderdale.
- Frank Isola (New York City): columnist for The Athletic and former columnist for the New York Daily News. He’s the cohost of the starting lineup on SiriusXM Radio and a regular substitute host on Pardon The Interruption.
- Martenzie Johnson (Washington, D.C.): Writer for ESPN.com's Andscape.
- Emily Kaplan (Chicago): Writer, Reporter, Podcaster. Lead NHL reporter and insider for ESPN/ABC and In the Crease with Linda Cohn. Previously NFL w/ MMQB, Philly Inquirer.
- Mina Kimes (Los Angeles): Senior writer for ESPN The Magazine and former co-host of Highly Questionable. Based at network's base in Los Angeles.
- Jen Lada (Milwaukee): Radio host for 94.5 ESPN Milwaukee and College GameDay features reporter.
- Marcel Louis-Jacques (Miami): ESPN NFL Nation Reporter for the Miami Dolphins.
- Harry Lyles Jr. (Atlanta): Staff writer for ESPN.com, co-host of Countdown to GameDay.
- Monica McNutt (New York City): college basketball & WNBA analyst.
- Woody Paige (Denver): Colorado Springs Gazette columnist and previously columnist at The Denver Post. Based in Denver at KMGH-TV. Was based in New York during his time on 1st and 10. Although he left the Denver Post in 2016, he continued to be based there while in Denver until February 2017.
- Bill Plaschke (Los Angeles): Based in Los Angeles at the headquarters for the Los Angeles Times.
- Bob Ryan (Boston): Boston Globe Columnist emeritus, substitute host of PTI.
- Jorge Sedano (Los Angeles): Radio host for ESPN Radio stations, NBA on ESPN sideline reporter, college football play by play and Radio host for KSPN 710 Los Angeles. Based at the Networks base in Los Angeles.
- Ramona Shelburne (Los Angeles): Senior writer for ESPN.com. Co-host of TMI with Beadle & Shelburne on ESPN Los Angeles 710. Based in Los Angeles at network's base.
- Lindsey Thiry (Los Angeles): National NFL reporter for ESPN.
- Justin Tinsley (Washington, D.C.): Senior writer for ESPN.com's Andscape.
- Pablo Torre (New York City) : Former Co-host of High Noon alongside Bomani Jones, writer for ESPN The Magazine and ESPN.com, former reporter for Sports Illustrated, and occasional co-host of The Dan Le Batard Show. Also the designated substitute host. Usually based in New York, but sometimes based in Miami. He is also the host of the podcast Pablo Torre Finds Out and is a regular substitute host on Pardon The Interruption.
- Clinton Yates (Los Angeles): Senior writer for ESPN.com's Andscape.

=== Former panelists ===
- Jim Armstrong (Denver): Former columnist for The Denver Post. Was a frequent fill-in for Woody Paige.
- Josh Elliott (New York City): Former panelist of defunct show "Jim Rome is Burning," former contributor to ESPN the Magazine and ESPN.com, anchor of live morning SportsCenter with Hannah Storm. Left ESPN to become news anchor for Good Morning America, later moving to NBC Sports and most recently to CBS News.
- Kate Fagan (New York City): Columnist for espnW, contributor to Outside the Lines.
- Domonique Foxworth (Washington, D.C.): Former NFL cornerback who played in the league from 2005 to 2011 with the Denver Broncos, Atlanta Falcons and Baltimore Ravens. He remains at ESPN as a writer with The Undefeated and is also a regular guest on The Mike O'Meara Show and other ESPN Radio talk shows such as First Take and Highly Questionable.
- Jemele Hill (Los Angeles) Columnist for ESPN.com's Andscape. former co-host of SportsCenter at 6 and His & Hers, both alongside Michael Smith.
- Michael Holley (Boston): Former columnist for The Boston Globe and co-host on CSN New England and the WEEI radio talk shows "Dale and Holley" and "The Big Show", based in Boston. Originally a semi-regular, Holley left the show and ESPN to contribute to I, Max on Fox Sports Net and currently co-hosts the NBC show Brother from Another with Michael Smith, another ATH alumnus.
- Bomani Jones (New York City): Former co-host of High Noon alongside Pablo S. Torre, co-host of Highly Questionable, host of The Right Time with Bomani Jones, writer for ESPN.com. Based in New York; formerly based in Raleigh, North Carolina, and later Miami.
- Richard Justice (Houston): Former correspondent for MLB.com and former columnist for the Houston Chronicle.
- Andy Katz (Unknown): Former ESPN college basketball analyst.
- Joon Lee (New York City): Staff writer for ESPN.com who contributes to ESPN's MLB telecasts; former writer for Bleacher Report and Boston Herald.
- Jackie MacMullan (Boston): ESPN.com NBA columnist and freelance writer; former columnist for The Boston Globe.
- Jay Mariotti (Chicago,: Fanhouse.com, former columnist for the Chicago Sun-Times. Was arrested on May 11, 2011, and was charged with assault, stalking and domestic violence after approaching his ex-girlfriend, who he was ordered by a court to avoid, and was based in Los Angeles at the time of his arrest. Had been based at the headquarters of the Sun-Times. Mariotti appeared 1549 times on the show, with 329 wins.
- Charlie Pierce (Boston): The Boston Globe.
- Dianna Russini (New York City): NFL reporter and host who contributes to ESPN's year-round coverage of the National Football League. Her multi-faceted role includes reporting, hosting, analysis and features. She contributes to NFL Live, Sunday NFL Countdown, Fantasy Football Now and SportsCenter, and she often breaks NFL news stories.
- Adam Schefter (Denver) : Former reporter for The Denver Post and NFL Network, currently with ESPN as an NFL Insider. Schefter was still based in Denver when he appeared on Around The Horn.
- T. J. Simers (Los Angeles): One of the original regulars along with Woody Paige, Jay Mariotti, Tim Cowlishaw, and Bob Ryan. Based at the Los Angeles Times. Left show in 2003.
- Michael Smith (Bristol CT): Occasional co-host of Highly Questionable, former Boston Globe and ESPN.com columnist, former host of His & Hers and SportsCenter at 6, both alongside Jemele Hill. He currently co-hosts the NBC show Brother from Another with fellow Globe and ATH alumnus Michael Holley.
- Sarah Spain (Chicago): Columnist for espnW, co-host of ESPN Radio's Spain and Fitz, occasional contributor to Highly Questionable.
- Jon "Stugotz" Weiner (Miami): Co-host of The Dan Le Batard Show with Stugotz.
- Gene Wojciechowski (Chicago): ESPN.com, columnist for ESPNChicago.com. Based at the site of the Chicago Sun-Times.

=== Panelist statistics ===
Current stats after the Friday, May 23, 2025, episode

Name	# wins	# appearances	winning %	Special Notes
Woody Paige	700	2,965	23.6%	All-time leader in wins & appearances, 2015 & 2024 Tournament of Champions; 71-70 versus Bob Ryan; 20th Anniversary show winner; 20.9 Pts/Show
Tim Cowlishaw	551	2,114	26.1%	First show: November 5, 2002; 2018 & 2021 Tournament of Champions; 82-80 versus Woody Paige; 24-10 versus Frank Isola, fourth lowest score (-99)
Bill Plaschke	428	1,758	24.3%	First show: April 16, 2003; 2014 Tournament of Champions, third lowest score (-108), 74-66 versus Woody Paige, 21-15 versus Frank Isola, 13-9 versus Sarah Spain.
Kevin Blackistone	386	1,608	24.0%	First show: January 21, 2003; 2011-2019 Tournament of Champions, 39-38 versus Bill Plaschke, 61-53 versus Woody Paige; 21.1 Pts/Show
J. A. Adande	339	1,298	26.1%	First show: November 11, 2002; 2012 Tournament of Champions, 44-37 versus Tim Cowlishaw
Jay Mariotti	329	1,549	21.2%	Hasn't appeared on the show since August 2010; Consecutive shows record (265 episodes); Won 2009 April Fools episode hosted by Woody Paige, only episode to be scored with golf score procedure (lowest points wins).
Jackie MacMullan	259	891	29.1%	First show: November 12, 2002; 2nd lowest score (-474); 37-35 versus Woody Paige; Last show 12/22/2021, retired after 19 years on ATH and 39 years at ESPN; 22.8 Pts/Show
Israel Gutierrez	228	868	26.3%	First show: March 18, 2008; 7x Halloween Champ; 2023 Tournament of Champions; 20.6 Pts/Show
Bob Ryan	224	756	29.6%	8-6 versus Bill Plaschke; 21.6 Pts/Show
Frank Isola	192	905	21.2%	First show: September 27, 2013; 2016 Tournament of Champions, Lowest active winning percentage (minimum 100 appearances), 7-5 versus Jorge Sedano, 5-1 versus Emily Kaplan
Bomani Jones	160	561	28.5%	First show: October 22, 2010; 23.4 Pts/Show
Pablo Torre	138.75	606	22.9%	First show: October 25, 2012; 2013 Tournament of Champions; Most points ever (176); 2nd most points ever (136); 2nd most points lost (-336); Third lowest score (-286); 9-5 versus Sarah Spain
Michael Smith	137	452	30.3%	First show: October 9, 2003; Highest winning percentage (minimum 100 appearances)
Clinton Yates	135	525	25.7%	First show: September 6, 2017; 14-13 versus Tim Cowlishaw
Sarah Spain	127	435	29.2%	First show: February 25, 2016; 2017 & 2020 Tournament of Champions; highest score (74); 11-9-1 versus Woody Paige, 14-2 versus Tim Cowlishaw; 21.3 Pts/Show
Mina Kimes	89	305	29.2%	First show: March 30, 2017
Ramona Shelburne	61	219	27.9%	First show: July 2016; 22.2 Pts/Show
Courtney Cronin	52	180	28.9%	First show: June 1, 2022; Won in her debut on the show, first rookie panelist to win Tournament of Champions (2022); 21.5 Pts/Show
Harry Lyles Jr.	48	200	24.0%	First show: October 12, 2021
Jorge Sedano	47.5	180	26.4%	First show: October 19, 2018; 22.3 Pts/Show
David Dennis Jr.	44	205	21.5%	First show: May 4, 2022; Record for lowest points in a Showdown (-25); Lowest score (-491) and points lost (-501).
Emily Kaplan	43	148	29.1%	First show: May 10, 2019; Highest Point Avg.: 23.7 Pts/Show (minimum 100 appearances)
Kate Fagan	42	158	26.6%	First show: October 22, 2014
Justin Tinsley	41	167	24.6%	First show: January 28, 2021
Michael Holley	34	120	28.3%	
Kevin Clark	29	92	31.5%	First show: September 22, 2023; Won in his debut on the show.
Jemele Hill	23	79	29.1%	
Monica McNutt	22	87	25.3%	First show: February 17, 2021
Elle Duncan	19	63	30.2%	First show: June 22, 2020
Bill Barnwell	19	91	20.9%	First show: September 15, 2023
Jim Armstrong	18	75	24.0%	
Marcel Louis-Jacques	17	60	28.3%	First show: June 20, 2023; Won in his debut on the show.
T. J. Simers	10	65	15.4%	Winner of the first Around the Horn episode
Joon Lee	10	49	20.4%	First show: April 28, 2021
Gene Wojciechowski	9	44	20.4%	
Jen Lada	7	18	38.9%	First show: June 12, 2024; Won in her debut on the show.
Josh Elliott	5	23	21.7%	
Charlie Pierce	5	13	38.5%	
LZ Granderson	4	19	21.1%	
Jon "Stugotz" Weiner	4	16	25.0%	First show: April 1, 2019
Lindsey Thiry	3	11	27.3%	First show: September 29, 2023; Won in her debut on the show.
Domonique Foxworth	3	8	37.5%	First show: May 9, 2019
David Jacoby	3	5	60.0%	First show: September 13, 2019
Martenzie Johnson	2	12	16.7%	First show: February 23, 2023; Won in his debut on the show.
Adam Schefter	2	5	40.0%	
Kimberley A. Martin	2	4	50.0%	First show: December 15, 2021
Richard Justice	1	5	20.0%	
Dianna Russini	1	4	25.0%	First show: June 27, 2019
Mark Cuban	1	1	100.0%	Guest Panelist
Lil Wayne	1	1	100.0%	Guest Panelist
Bruce Arthur	1	1	100.0%	First Canadian Panelist, First Canadian Winner
Malika Andrews	1	1	100.0%	First show: December 12, 2019
Christine Williamson	1	1	100.0%	First show: October 3, 2023; Won in her debut on the show.
John Powers	0	5	0.0%	
Dan Shanoff	0	5	0.0%	
Ron Borges	0	4	0.0%	
Jean Jacques Taylor	0	4	0.0%	
Mark Kiszla	0	2	0.0%	
Andy Katz	0	1	0.0%	
Bob Glauber	0	1	0.0%	
