= T. J. Simers =

American sports columnist (1950–2024)

Thomas John Simers (September 2, 1950 – June 2, 2024) was an American sports columnist who worked for the Los Angeles Times from 1990 to 2013 before accepting a position at the Orange County Register where he worked until accepting a voluntary buyout. He attended Northern Illinois University. He appeared on ESPN's Around the Horn as a panelist in the early days of the show.

Simers sued the Los Angeles Times for age and health discrimination, claiming he was pushed out from his $234,000-a-year job after he suffered a minor stroke. In November 2015, a jury awarded him $7.1 million. After the jury's ruling, the judge nevertheless dismissed the constructive termination claim but said substantial evidence supported the age and disability discrimination claims; and the judge vacated the damages award and ordered a new trial on damages. The California Appeals Court affirmed the judge's ruling.

Simers also worked at The San Diego Union, the Rocky Mountain News, The Commercial Appeal, the Morristown Daily Record, the Beloit Daily News, the Coeur d'Alene Press, and the DeKalb Chronicle.

He was named 2000 California Sportswriter of the Year by the National Sportscasters and Sportswriters Association.

Simers died from brain cancer on June 2, 2024, at the age of 73.
