= Woody Paige =

American sports columnist (born 1946)

- Born: 27 June 1946 (age 80); Memphis, Tennessee, U.S.
- Occupation: Sports columnist
- Years active: 1964–present
- Website: woodypaige.com

Woodrow Wilson Paige Jr. (born June 27, 1946) is a sports columnist for The Gazette, author, and was a panelist on the ESPN talk show Around the Horn until the show ended in 2025. He was a columnist for The Denver Post for 35 years, and co-host of Cold Pizza and its spin-off show 1st and 10 until November 2006, when it was announced that Paige would return to the Post. Paige is a member of the Pro Football Hall of Fame committee and is a Baseball Hall of Fame voter.

== Early life and education ==
Paige wrote for the Whitehaven Press in 1963 while still in high school. He later attended the University of Tennessee and joined Lambda Chi Alpha fraternity in 1964.

== Career ==
After graduating from UT he went on to write for the Knoxville Journal, The Commercial Appeal of Memphis, and the Rocky Mountain News of Denver. Paige was honored with an Accomplished Alumni award by University of Tennessee in 2012.

=== The Denver Post ===
Paige joined The Denver Post in 1981. In 2001, he reported that an employee at Invesco, which had the naming rights to the Denver Broncos stadium, Invesco Field at Mile High, claimed that the nickname for the stadium inside the company was "The Diaphragm", after its shape which slightly resembled a contraceptive device with the same name. The CEO of the company threatened Paige and the Post with legal action over the allegations but had to retract the lawsuit when it was discovered that the story was true.

=== Around the Horn ===
Paige was a panelist on Around the Horn, an ESPN talk show. He is both the winningest and losingest panelist on the show. Each segment, he displayed a chalkboard with a humorous quote such as "I'm chalk-bored". He had a friendly rivalry with fellow panelist Jay Mariotti prior to the latter's dismissal from the show; the two currently host a sports podcast titled "Unmuted", which references the mute button employed on ATH. Paige won the final episode of ATH on May 23, 2025, bringing his total number of wins to 700.

=== Cold Pizza ===
In July 2004, Paige announced that he was taking a one-year leave from the Post to join ESPN2's then-debuting Cold Pizza (a daytime-TV "morning show"-style program that was only loosely grounded in sports, aimed also at female viewers). On the show, he was featured in a segment where he bantered with sportswriter Skip Bayless. Paige continued to contribute to Around the Horn during this time.

=== The Gazette ===
Paige left The Denver Post in 2016. He began writing a sports column for The Gazette the same year.
