= Pablo Torre (journalist) =

American sportswriter and host (born 1985)

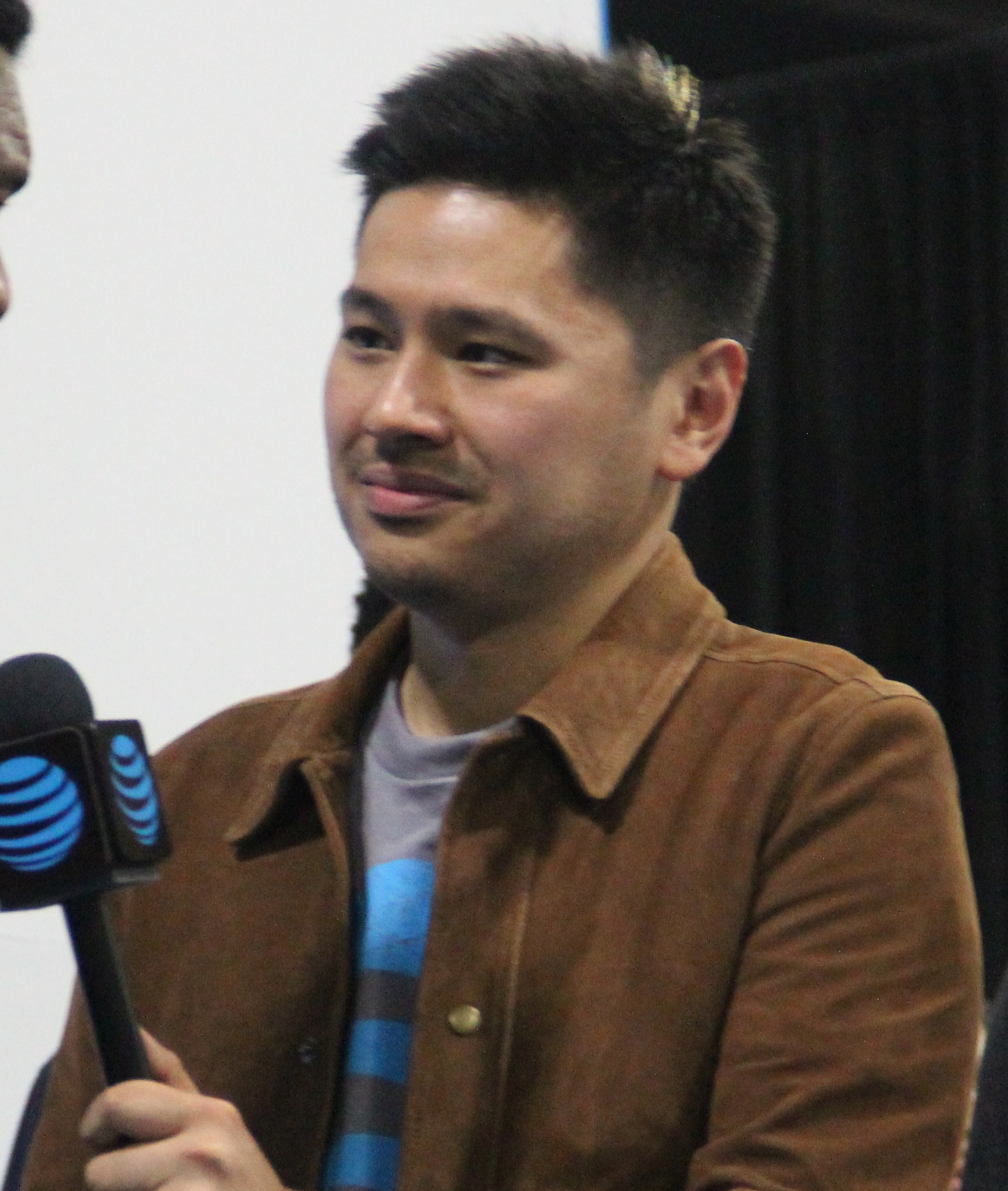
- Torre in 2018
- Born: September 27, 1985 (age 41); New York City, U.S.
- Education: Harvard University (AB)
- Occupations: Television host Sportswriter
- Spouse: Elizabeth Doherty (m. 2016)

Pablo Sison Torre (born September 27, 1985) is an American journalist, podcaster, and television host. He hosts the podcast Pablo Torre Finds Out with Meadowlark Media. He previously hosted and contributed to various programs at ESPN, including the television program High Noon with Bomani Jones and the podcast ESPN Daily. In 2026, Torre won the Pulitzer Prize for Audio Reporting for his reporting on the Los Angeles Clippers salary cap scandal.

== Education ==
Torre attended Regis High School in New York City. His parents are immigrants from the Philippines. His mother is a dermatologist. Pablo once jokingly referred to his father as "the LeBron James of Filipino urologists".

Torre graduated magna cum laude from Harvard College with a degree in sociology in 2007, and was inducted into the Phi Beta Kappa society. There, he wrote a 114-page thesis entitled Sympathy for the Devil? Child Homicide, Victim Characteristics, and the Sentencing Preferences of the American Conscience, which won the Albert M. Fulton Prize for best thesis in the field of sociology. At Harvard, he wrote for The Harvard Crimson, where he was executive editor.

== Career ==
=== Sports Illustrated ===
Upon graduating from Harvard, Torre joined Sports Illustrated as a staff writer, where his focuses included investigative reporting, boxing, and basketball.

His 2009 award-winning article "How (and Why) Athletes Go Broke", along with two follow-up reports, spurred an investigation by the U.S. Securities and Exchange Commission of the investment firm Triton Financial for defrauding investors in a multimillion-dollar scam. A federal jury would later convict Triton's CEO Kurt Barton guilty of operating a Ponzi scheme which defrauded investors of more than $500 million. ESPN later broadcast Broke, a 30 for 30 documentary, which was based on Torre’s research and which featured him extensively on-air.

=== ESPN ===
On October 10, 2012, Torre joined ESPN as a senior writer for both its website and magazine. On March 12, 2014, Torre first filled in as host on TV talk show Around the Horn in the absence of Tony Reali. In August of that year, Torre again covered for Reali when he took time off for the birth of his daughter. In 2015, Torre was the first person to report that Tony Wroten had begun using the term "Trust the Process" when talking to the Philadelphia 76ers during their rebuilding phase.

In 2016, Torre produced his first 30 for 30 entitled Friedman's Shoes, which was directed by Danny Lee. In 2018, Torre and Bomani Jones debuted High Noon, a daily show from the new ESPN Studios in New York City's South Street Seaport. The show was cancelled in March 2020. In 2020, Torre began hosting the ESPN Daily podcast.

At ESPN, Torre was a frequent guest on various ESPN shows such as Around the Horn and The Sports Reporters. Torre also frequently served as an alternate host for Pardon the Interruption, Around the Horn, and Highly Questionable. He has also appeared on Outside the Lines, The Dan Le Batard Show with Stugotz, and TrueHoop.

=== Pablo Torre Finds Out ===
In March 2023, Torre joined Meadowlark Media, a new company founded by former colleague Dan Le Batard. Torre continued making appearances on the ESPN program Around the Horn until its cancellation in 2025, and continues to contribute to ESPN's Pardon the Interruption as a fill-in host.

In September 2023, Torre launched a new podcast and web series called Pablo Torre Finds Out. The show employs about 12 producers and editors, and combines original reporting and conversational content. In an interview with Intelligencer, he described his motto in making the show as "take stupid things seriously". Frequent guests on the show have included Le Batard, Mina Kimes, Katie Nolan, and John Skipper. The show was initially sponsored by DraftKings, but the relationship ended in 2025 as part of what Torre described as a "conscious uncoupling" due to the reputation of sports gambling companies. Later that year, Pablo Torre Finds Out joined The Athletic, which is part of The New York Times.

In September 2025, Torre broke the Los Angeles Clippers salary cap scandal, reporting that Steve Ballmer circumvented the NBA salary cap to compensate Los Angeles Clippers player Kawhi Leonard. His work on the issue earned him the Pulitzer Prize for Audio Reporting. The NBA conducted its own investigation into the Clippers' conduct, ultimately resulting in the levying of what was described as "the largest punishment in league history" on the franchise.

== Personal life ==
Torre is Filipino American. In 2016, Torre married Elizabeth Doherty. They have a daughter.

== Filmography ==
Year	Title	Credit
2016	Friedman's Shoes	Producer
2022	38 at the Garden	Cast
