= Israel Gutierrez =

American journalist

- Born: June 26, 1977 (age 49)
- Education: University of Florida
- Occupation: Sports reporter

Israel Gutierrez (born June 26, 1977) is a sports reporter for ESPN. Before joining the staff at ESPN, he worked for the Miami Herald as well as The Palm Beach Post. Gutierrez has covered the Miami Heat for both newspapers.

A South Florida native and University of Florida graduate, he also has covered the Florida Marlins. Gutierrez is of Dominican descent.

== Early years ==
While attending the University of Florida in Gainesville, Gutierrez was a staff writer for the student newspaper Independent Florida Alligator. Prior to that, he attended North Miami Senior High.

== Career ==
Gutierrez has appeared as a sports commentator on ESPN2's ESPN First Take as part of 1st and 10 with Jay Crawford and Skip Bayless.

On March 1, 2004, he debuted on Around the Horn. The following day he recorded his first win against Kevin Blackistone. As of July 2008, he has become a recurring panelist on the show. He did not appear for over two years before making his return on August 1, 2012, picking up a gold medal in the Around the Horn Summer Games by defeating Max Kellerman.

In November 2008, Gutierrez began appearing on ESPN's The Sports Reporters and was a regular panelist until the show's demise. His work at the Miami Herald continues to receive national attention, including regular mentions on USsportspages.com.

He was a regular guest host on the Dan LeBatard Show and Highly Questionable, as well as other ESPN radio shows. Gutierrez also co-hosted on the radio show Izzy and Spain with ESPN reporter Sarah Spain.

Gutierrez joined Jon "Stugotz" Weiner on his daily program Stugotz and Company which launched as a podcast in August 2025, and continued with the show as it made its official live radio debut on FOX Sports Radio as Stugotz and Company LIVE! on January 19, 2026.
