= Domonique Foxworth =

American football player (born 1983)

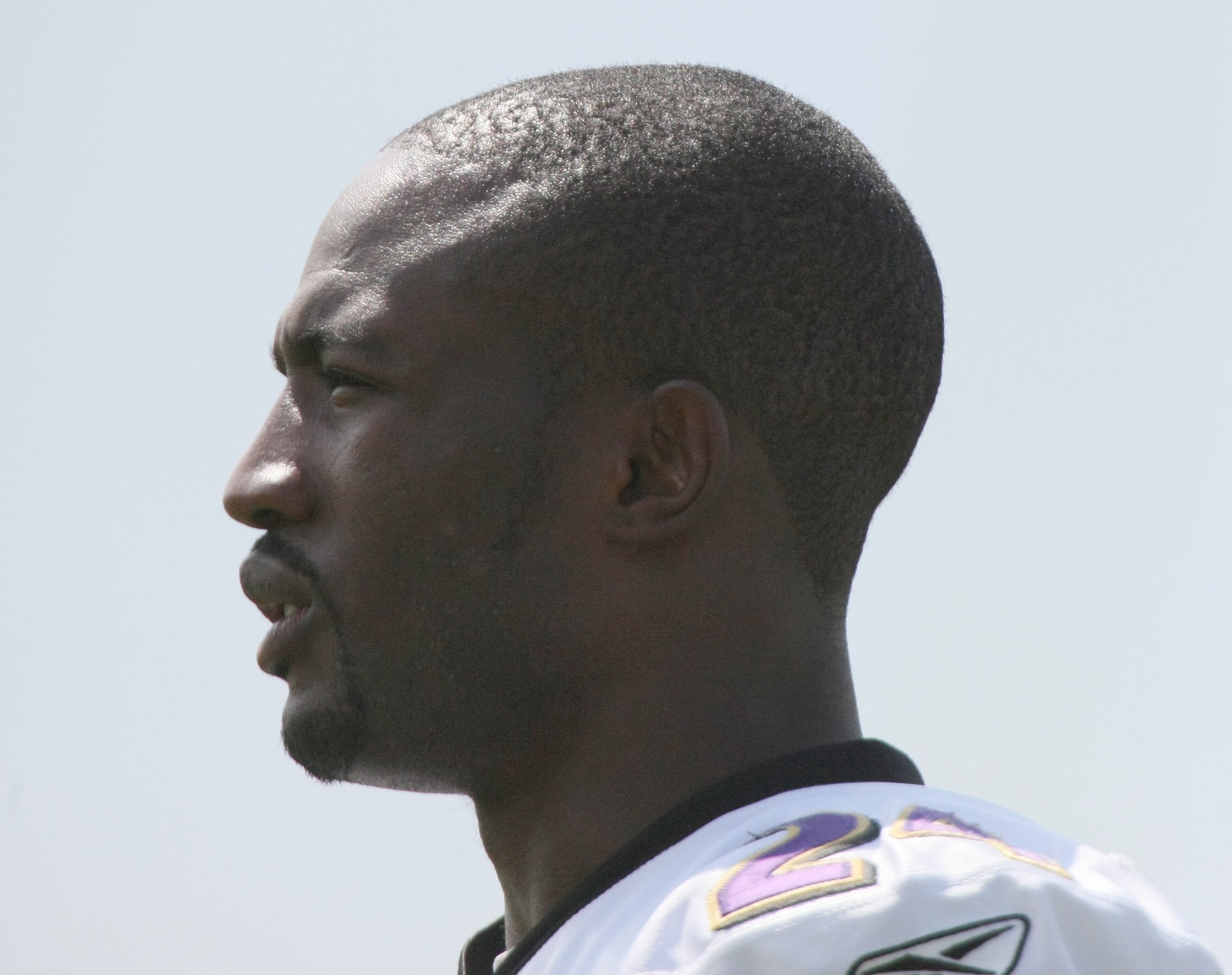
- Foxworth with the Baltimore Ravens in 2009

No. 22, 24
- Position: Cornerback

Personal information
- Born: March 27, 1983 (age 43); Oxford, England
- Listed height: 5 ft 11 in (1.80 m)
- Listed weight: 180 lb (82 kg)

Career information
- High school: Western Tech (Catonsville, Maryland, U.S.)
- College: Maryland (2001–2004)
- NFL draft: 2005: 3rd round, 97th overall pick

Career history
- Denver Broncos (2005–2007); Atlanta Falcons (2008); Baltimore Ravens (2009–2011)

Awards and highlights
- First-team All-ACC (2002); 2× Second-team All-ACC (2003, 2004)

Career NFL statistics
- Total tackles: 267
- Forced fumbles: 3
- Fumble recoveries: 3
- Pass deflections: 53
- Interceptions: 8
- Stats at Pro Football Reference

Domonique Foxworth (born March 27, 1983) is an American former professional football player who was a cornerback in the National Football League (NFL). He played college football for the Maryland Terrapins. He was selected by the Denver Broncos in the third round of the 2005 NFL draft.

== Early life ==
Foxworth was born in Oxford, England, during his father's career in the United States Army. The family relocated to Maryland when Foxworth was kindergarten-aged. Foxworth has one older brother, Dion.

Foxworth played high school football at Western Tech (officially, Western School of Technology and Environmental Science), where he was named to the Baltimore Sun's first-team All-Metro and All-Baltimore County.

== College career ==
After graduating early from high school in the fall of 2000, Foxworth enrolled at the University of Maryland and signed with the Terrapins in early 2001. While playing for the Terrapins, Foxworth started every game between 2001 and September 2004, and received All-Atlantic Coast Conference (ACC) honors three times. He graduated from Maryland in 3.5 years with a degree in American Studies.

== Professional career ==
Pre-draft measurables
Height	Weight	Arm length	Hand span	40-yard dash	10-yard split	20-yard split	20-yard shuttle	Three-cone drill	Vertical jump	Broad jump	Bench press
5 ft 11 1/8 in (1.81 m)	184 lb (83 kg)	30 in (0.76 m)	9 1/8 in (0.23 m)	4.46 s	1.53 s	2.57 s	3.89 s	6.78 s	41.0 in (1.04 m)	10 ft 5 in (3.18 m)	14 reps
All values from NFL Combine

=== National Football League ===
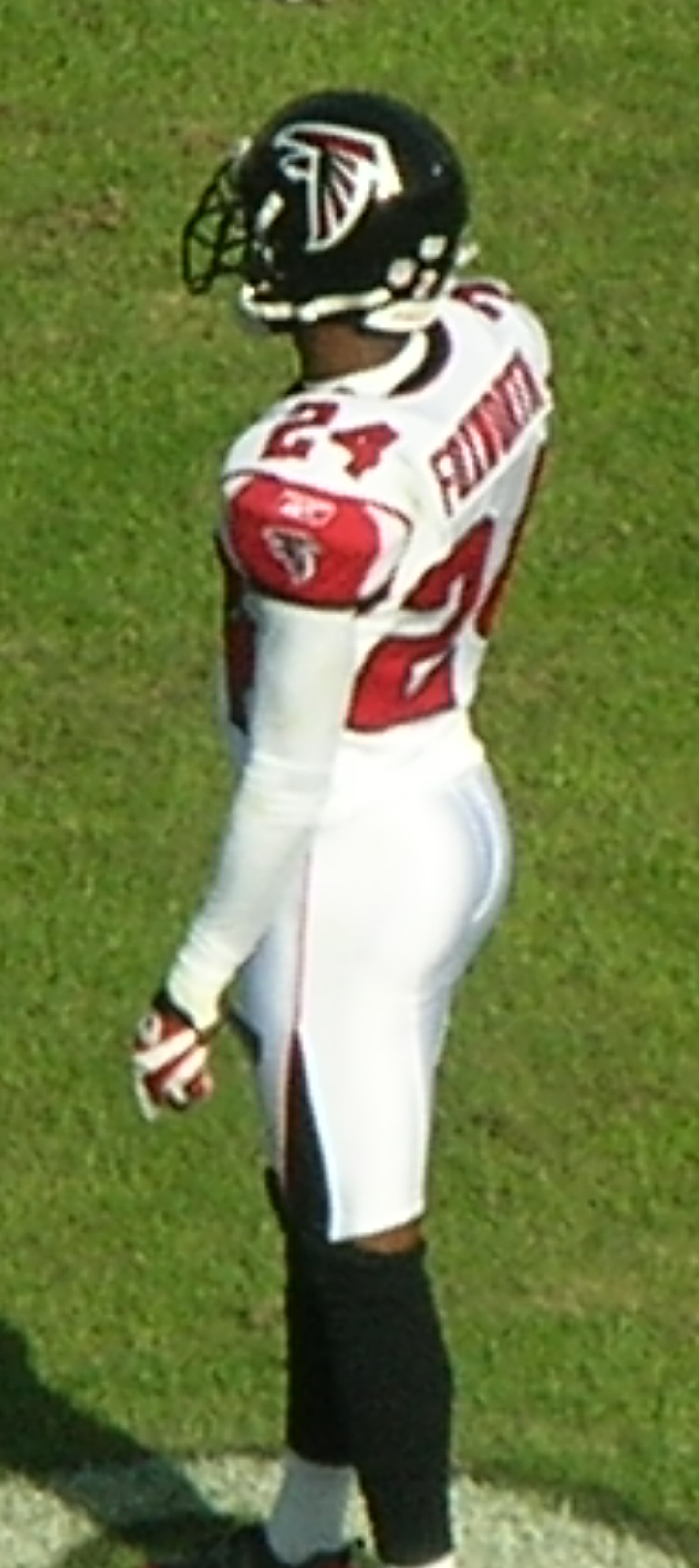
Foxworth with Atlanta in November 2008.

Foxworth began his career in the NFL after being drafted by the Denver Broncos in the third round, with the 97th overall pick of the 2005 NFL draft. The Broncos traded Foxworth to the Atlanta Falcons in September 2008 for a conditional seventh-round pick in the 2009 NFL draft.

On the first day of training camp for the 2010 season, Foxworth tore his ACL, causing him to miss the entire season. Foxworth's knee problems continued into 2011, with the Ravens putting him on the injured reserve list after playing only two games, ending his season early. In May 2012, Foxworth announced that he planned to retire.

=== NFL Players Association ===
In addition to his work on the field, Foxworth has also held a number of positions with the NFL Players Association (NFLPA). In 2007, the Broncos elected Foxworth as an NFLPA player representative, and the following year he became the youngest player to become vice president of the NFLPA Executive Committee.

In 2012, Foxworth was elected president of the NFLPA without opposition.

== Career statistics ==
Year	Team	Games		Tackles				Fumbles			Interceptions					
Year	Team	GP	GS	Comb	Solo	Ast	Sack	FF	FR	Yds	INT	Yds	Avg	Lng	TD	PD
2005	DEN	16	7	70	64	6	0.0	1	2	9	2	23	12.0	23	0	16
2006	DEN	16	5	61	48	13	0.0	1	0	0	1	45	45.0	45	0	6
2007	DEN	14	6	42	31	11	0.0	1	0	0	0	0	0.0	0	0	5
2008	ATL	14	10	38	35	3	0.0	0	0	0	1	1	1.0	1	0	11
2009	BAL	16	16	53	48	5	0.0	0	1	0	4	34	9.0	19	0	16
2011	BAL	2	0	2	1	1	0.0	0	0	0	0	0	0.0	0	0	0
Career		78	44	266	227	39	0.0	3	2	9	8	103	13	45	0	54

== Post-NFL playing career ==
=== Education ===
Following retirement from the NFL and while serving as the NFL Players Association president, Foxworth attended Harvard Business School and earned an MBA.

=== NBPA ===
In 2014, Foxworth was hired as Chief Operating Officer for the National Basketball Players Association. In 2015, he left the position and was replaced by Erica McKinley. In a 2023 interview with Pablo Torre, Foxworth stated that he left the position in order to be closer to family.

=== Commentating career ===
Foxworth is now a writer with The Undefeated and host of The Morning Roast on ESPN Radio with Clinton Yates and Mina Kimes. He is also a regular guest on The Mike O'Meara Show and other ESPN Radio talk shows such as First Take, The Bill Barnwell Show podcast, Golic and Wingo, and The Dan Le Batard Show with Stugotz, as well as The Right Time with Bomani Jones, which he appears on every Friday. Foxworth is also a frequent guest on the ESPN morning show Get Up! and Highly Questionable (now called Debatable). He also hosted Pardon the Interruption on August 26, 2022. As of September 7, 2022, he hosts the podcast The Domonique Foxworth Show for ESPN.

=== Television writing ===
In 2024, he served as a writer of FX's American Sports Story: Aaron Hernandez.

== Personal life ==
Foxworth married his wife Ashley, a fellow University of Maryland and Harvard graduate, in 2010. They have three children.

While with the Denver Broncos, Foxworth worked with the Boys & Girls Clubs of America, taking a leading role in the fundraising and planning for the Darrent Williams Memorial Teen Center, a social and scholastic retreat for teens, named in honor of murdered Broncos player Darrent Williams. Foxworth also created Baltimore BORN Inc to provide lower income high school boys with resources and networking opportunities. In 2010, Foxworth received the first annual Tim Wheatley Award from the Baltimore Sun Media Group for his community service work.
