= Skydance Sports =

Sports subsidiary of Skydance Sports Entertainment

Skydance Sports, LLC
- Type: Division
- Industry: Sports
- Founded: October 20, 2021; 5 years ago
- Headquarters: Santa Monica, California, United States
- Key people: Jon Weinbach (president)
- Owner: Skydance Corporation
- Parent: Skydance Media (2021–2025); Skydance Sports Entertainment (Note: Known as Paramount Sports Entertainment from 2025-2026) (2025–present)
- Website: www.skydance.com/about/brands/skydance-sports

Skydance Sports is a subsidiary of Skydance Sports Entertainment, a division of Skydance Corporation. Established on October 20, 2021 by Skydance Media, the division is dedicated to sports films, series, and documentaries. It is led by Jon Weinbach.

== History ==
In January 2022, Skydance Sports announced a co-production agreement with Meadowlark Media on sports documentaries. The first two productions under this agreement were Good Rivals—a three-part documentary series on the Mexico–United States soccer rivalry for Amazon Prime, and a documentary on women's basketball player Diana Taurasi.

In March 2022, Religion of Sports signed with Skydance Sports to develop, finance, and produce a slate of sports-related shows for multiple platforms, starting with a series called The Owl. It is created and executive produced by Michael Perri and directed by Aurora Guerrero. In April 2022, it was reported that Amazon Studios had partnered with Skydance Sports, Artists Equity, and Mandalay Pictures on a Ben Affleck biographical drama on Nike's Air Jordan shoe line. On October 12, 2022, Kylian Mbappé and his production banner, Zebra Valley, signed a multi-year first-look deal with Skydance Sports.

On November 3, 2022, Skydance Sports announced a behind-the-scenes documentary series following the 2024 America's Cup, produced by Free Solo directors Elizabeth Chai Vasarhelyi and Jimmy Chin.

In November 2022, the NFL announced a joint venture with Skydance Sports via its NFL Films division and investment arm 32 Equity to create a "premier global multi-sports production studio". The first projects announced under the venture included a documentary miniseries on Dallas Cowboys owner Jerry Jones (which was acquired by Netflix in May 2024), the NFL draft documentary The Pick is In for The Roku Channel, a Jason Kelce documentary for Amazon Prime Video, and the NFL-themed Christmas movie Holiday Touchdown: A Chiefs Love Story for Hallmark Channel.

On March 4, 2025, Skydance Sports announced a multi-year media deal with Josh Allen, where he will develop scripted, unscripted, and branded content for the company.

On September 12, 2025, after the merger of Skydance Media and Paramount Global, Paramount Skydance announced the formation of a similar division known as Paramount Sports Entertainment. The division will incorporate Skydance Sports and be led by its chairman Jesse Sisgold; the new division is expected to also collaborate with CBS Sports, but it will not be directly involved in live sports broadcasts.

In October 2026, following the merger of Paramount Skydance and Warner Bros. Discovery, Skydance Sports parent Paramount Sports Entertainment was renamed to Skydance Sports Entertainment and reorganized into the newly-created Skydance TV Studios Group of Skydance TV.

== Filmography ==
=== Feature films ===
==== Released ====
Release	Title	Co-production companies	Distributor(s)	Notes
April 5, 2023	Air	Mandalay Pictures, Studio 8 and Artists Equity	Amazon Studios (U.S. distribution); Warner Bros. Pictures (International distribution)	
November 30, 2024	Holiday Touchdown: A Chiefs Love Story	NFL Films and Hallmark Media	Hallmark Channel	TV movie
September 11, 2026	Mighty Mary	—	Republic Pictures	
November 11, 2026	Madden	Escape Artists, ShowKat, DreamCrew Entertainment, Corazon Camera and NFL Films	Amazon MGM Studios	

==== Upcoming ====
Release	Title	Co-production companies	Distributor(s)	Ref(s)
December 25, 2026	Mr. Irrelevant	Megamix and Blackjack Films	Paramount Pictures	

=== Television series ===
Title	Years	Network	Co-production
Good Rivals	2022	Amazon Prime Video	Prime Video Sports, Meadowlark Media and Ocellated Media
NFL Draft: The Pick Is In	2023–present	The Roku Channel	NFL Films
They Call It Late Night with Jason Kelce	2025–present	ESPN	NFL Films and Wooderboy Productions
WWE Unreal	2025–present	Netflix	NFL Films, Omaha Productions and WWE
The Kingdom	2025–present	ESPN	NFL Films, Words + Pictures, 2PM Productions and Foolish Club Studios
Taurasi	2025	Amazon Prime Video	Prime Video Sports, Meadowlark Media, Institute Pictures and Difficult Media
America's Team: The Gambler and His Cowboys	2025	Netflix	NFL Films and Stardust Flames Productions
The Home Team: NY Jets	2025	Amazon Prime Video	Prime Video Sports, NFL Films, New York Jets, VaynerWATT
Rafa	2026	Netflix	Netflix Sports
The Dynasty: UConn Huskies	2026	Apple TV	Learfield Studios and Revue Studios
NFL Hometown Eats	2026–present	The Roku Channel	NFL Films, Hyphenate Media Group and Alfred Street Industries
The Program: Texas Tech	2026–present	Paramount+	SecondWind Creative
Team Moms: Baseball	2026–present	Paramount+	co-production with ITV America and Kim Kardashian Productions
The Land	February 15, 2027	Hulu	20th Television, NFL Films and Rhode Island Ave. Productions
