= List of programs broadcast by ESPN =

Top to bottom: Logos for ESPN, ESPN on ABC and ESPN+

The following is a list of programs currently, formerly, or soon to be broadcast on either ABC, ESPN, ESPN DTC, ESPN+, ESPN2, ESPN3, ESPNews, ESPNU, ESPN Deportes, ACC Network, SEC Network, NFL Network or NFL RedZone.

== Currently broadcast by ESPN ==
- Baseball Tonight (1990–present)
- E:60 (2007–present)
- ESPN Bet Live (2019–present)
- ESPN FC (2013–present)
- Inside the NBA (2025–present)
- Monday Night Countdown (1993–present)
- NBA Countdown (2002–present)
- NBA Today (2021–present)
- NFL Live (1998–present)
- NFL Matchup (1993–present)
- NFL Primetime (1987–present)
- NFL Rewind (2019–present)
- SportsCenter (1979–present)
- Sunday NFL Countdown (1985–present)
- The Point (2021–present)

=== Talk/debate ===
- Big Day with Peter Schrager (2026–present)
- Get Up! (2018–present)
- First Take (2007–present)
- Pardon the Interruption (2001–present)
- The Pat McAfee Show (2023–present)

=== Original series ===
- 30 for 30 (2009–present)

=== Game telecasts ===
- ACC Wednesday (2003–present)
- Big Monday (1987–present)
- CFL on ESPN (2013–present)
- ESPN College Football Primetime (Saturday) (1990–present)
- ESPN College Football Primetime (Thursday) (1997–present)
- ESPN Hockey Night (2021–present)
- ESPN Megacast (2006–present)
- ESPN2 College Football Friday Primetime (2004–present)
- ESPN2 College Football Saturday Primetime (1994–present)
- ESPN8 The Ocho (2017–present)
- Little League World Series (1985–present)
- Monday Night Baseball (1992–2022, 2024 and 2026–present)
- Monday Night Football (2006–present)
- Monday Night Football with Peyton and Eli (2021–present)
- NBA Friday (2002–present)
- NBA Wednesday (2002–present)
- NFL Network Exclusive Game Series (2026–present)
- Saturday Primetime (2005–present)
- Super Tuesday (1993–present)
- Throwdown Thursday (2003–present)
- Wednesday Night Baseball (1990–present)
- Wednesday Night Hoops (2003–present)
- WNBA on ESPN (1997–present)
- Wimbledon (2002–present)
- UFL on ESPN (2024–present)
- Banana Ball (2026–present)

=== Bowling ===
- PBA Tour (2026–present)

=== Bull riding ===
- PBR Camping World Team Series (2026–present)

=== Combat sports ===
- Professional Fighters League (2019–present)
- MVP Women's Boxing on ESPN (2026–present)

=== Football ===
- CW College Football (2026–present)

=== Motorsports ===
- NASCAR on The CW (August 4, 2026–present)

=== Professional wrestling ===
- WWE Premium Live Events (Sep 2025–present)
- WWE NXT (July 2026–present)

=== Polo ===
- Campeonato Argentino Abierto de Polo (2021–present)

== Upcoming ==
=== Motorsports ===
- Formula E (beginning in 2027)

== Formerly broadcast by ESPN ==
=== News/analysis ===
- Baseball 2Day (2000–)
- BassCenter (2003–2006)
- The Beat (2010–???)
- College Basketballs's Greatest Games (1995)
- College Football's Greatest Games (1995)
- College GameNight: Midnight Madness (2007–???)
- ESPN Hollywood (2005–2006)
- MLS Extratime (2000–2001)
- NASCAR Countdown (2007–2014)
- NASCAR Now (2007–2014)
- Nation's Business Today (1980–1991)
- NFL32 (2004)
- NHL 2Night (1995–2004)
- RPM 2Night (1995–2003)
- Scripps National Spelling Bee (1994–2021)
- SpeedWeek (1984–1997)
- SportsNite (1993–1997)
- The Trifecta (since 2005)
- World Cup Live (2006–2014)
- NFL Insiders (2013–2017)
- The Jump (2016–2021)

=== Talk/debate ===
- Always Late with Katie Nolan (2018–2020)
- Around the Horn (2002–2025)
- Cold Pizza (2003–2007)
- The Fantasy Show (2006)
- Jim Rome is Burning (2003–2012)
- Highly Questionable (2011–2021)
- Mike & Mike (2006–2017)
- Best of Mike and Mike (2006–2017)
- Olbermann (2013–2015)
- Outside the Lines (1990–2022)
- Outside the Lines Nightly (2003–2006)
- Quite Frankly with Stephen A. Smith (2005–2007)
- SportsNight (1993–1997)
- Talk2 (1993–1998)
- Unscripted with Chris Connelly (2001–2002)
- Up Close (1982–2001)
- Winners Bracket (2010)
- Barstool Van Talk (2017)
- Intentional Talk (2017–2018, produced by MLB Network)
- This Just In With Max Kellerman (2021)

=== Original series ===
- 2 Minute Drill (2000–2001)
- All American (TV series)
- Battle of the Gridiron Stars (2005–06)
- Beg, Borrow and Deal (2001–2002)
- Bill Walton's Long Strange Trip (2003)
- Bonds on Bonds (2006)
- Bound for Glory (2005)
- The Bronx Is Burning (2007)
- The Captain (2022)
- Cheap Seats (2004–2006)
- The Contender (2005)
- Dream Job (2004–2006)
- ESPN2 Block Party (since 2005)
- ESPN2 Garage (since 2007)
- Madden Nation (since 2006)
- NBA Live: Bring It Home (since 2007)
- The New American Sportsman (since 2006)
- Free Agent (2005)
- I'd Do Anything (2004–2005)
- It's The Shoes
- Knight School (2006)
- The Last Dance (2020)
- The Life
- Nine for IX (2013)
- Playmakers (2003)
- Shaquille (2005)
- Sportraits (1988)
- Stump the Schwab (2004–2006)
- Teammates (since 2005)
- The Wild Rules (2003–2004)
- Tilt (2005)

=== Sports telecasts ===
- Arena Football on ESPN (1987–1988, 1992–2002, 2007–2008, 2014–2016, 2019)
- ESPN DayGame (1996–2006)
- ESPN National Hockey Night (1992–2004)
- ESPN SpeedWorld (1979–2006)
- MLS Soccer Saturday (1996–2006)
- NHRA (2001–2015)
- Sunday Night Football (1987–2005)
- Thursday Night Baseball (2003–2006)
- Friday Night Fights (1998–2015)
- Sunday Night Baseball (1990–2025)
- MLS on ESPN (1996–2022)
- USFL on ESPN (1983–1985)
- XFL on ESPN (2020–2023)

=== Motorsports ===
- ESPN SpeedWorld (1979–2006)
- IndyCar Series on ESPN (1997–2018)
- NASCAR on ESPN (1981–2000, 2007–2014)
- NHRA (2001–2015)
- SRX Thursday Night Thunder (2023)
- Formula 1 on ESPN (1984–1997, 2018–2025)
- Formula 2 on ESPN (2017–2025)
- Formula 3 on ESPN (2019–2025)
- Porsche Supercup on ESPN (2018–2025)

=== Combat sports ===
- Friday Night Fights (1998–2015)
- Top Rank Boxing on ESPN (2017–2025)
- UFC on ESPN (2019–2025)

=== Other ===
- BodyShaping (1990–1998)
- Drum Corps International (2005–2007)
- NTRA Super Saturdays
- Professional Bowlers Association (1985–2018)

=== Professional wrestling ===
- AWA Championship Wrestling (1985–1990)
- GWF Global SuperCard Wrestling (1991–1993)
- Legends of WCCW / USWA (1988–1991)
- World Class Championship Wrestling / USWA Wrestling (1986–1991)
- WWE WrestleMania (2020)

== Movies ==
- 3: The Dale Earnhardt Story (2004)
- Black Magic (2008)
- Code Breakers (2005)
- Four Minutes (2005)
- Hustle (2004)
- The Junction Boys (2002)
- Mr. and Mrs. America (2007)
- Once in a Lifetime: The Extraordinary Story of the New York Cosmos (2006)
- Ruffian (2007)
- A Season on the Brink (2002)
- Through the Fire (2006)

== See also ==
- ESPN
