= David Le Batard =

Cuban-American artist (1972–2023)

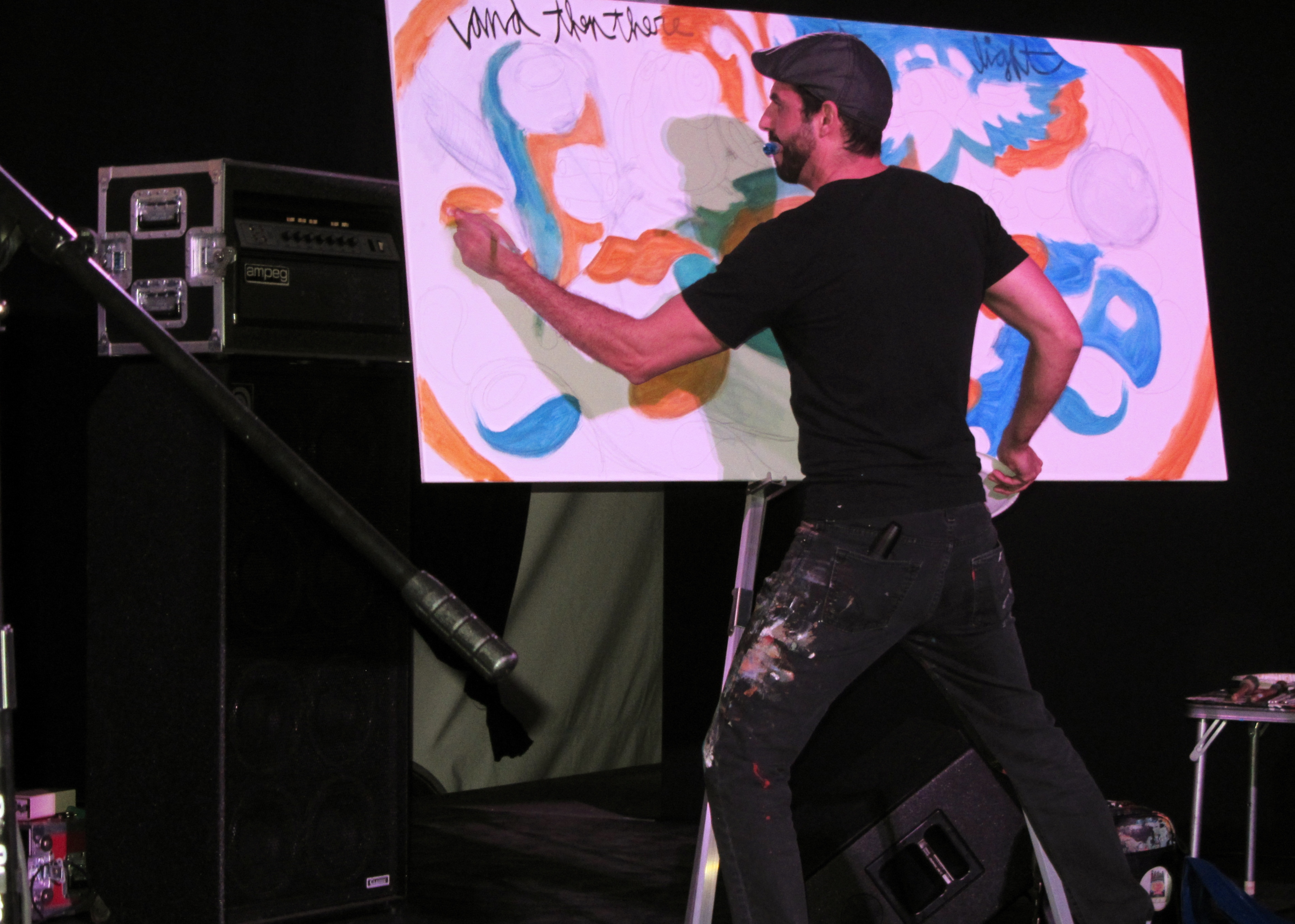
LEBO painting live at the Miami Book Fair International in 2014

David Adam Le Batard (November 19, 1972 – August 1, 2023), also known by the nickname LEBO, was an American graphic and fine artist known for his murals, live painting, and sculpture. He was described as having been one of southern Florida's "most recognizable artists", and "almost an institution" in the art world for his wide range of media, projects, and locations.

== Personal history ==
Le Batard was born in New York City on November 19, 1972, to Cuban exile parents, Gonzalo and Lourdes Le Batard. He was raised in South Florida, where he attended the Chaminade-Madonna College Preparatory School in Hollywood, Florida, then Florida International University. He won the 1990 Silver Knight Award for art in Broward County, Florida, and later judged that competition. He was a lecturer in residence at the International Museum of Cartoon Art while attending Florida International University, which he graduated in 1995.

Le Batard was the younger brother of Miami sportswriter Dan Le Batard, who hosts the radio and television program The Dan Le Batard Show with Stugotz. David occasionally made appearances on his brother's show despite the fact that he had, by his own admission, never willingly attended a sporting event. He also served as the show's art director, designing television graphics and its former studio at the Clevelander Hotel.

David Le Batard died on August 1, 2023, at the age of 50.

== Themes and influences ==
LeBatard referred to his work as "postmodern cartoon art expressionism". His work often depicts musicians and musical metaphors, inspired by street art and Cuban music. His visual style involved "soulful" line-based abstractions against bold flat color backgrounds.

== Works, collaborations and commissions ==
Le Batard also worked in the media of fabric, aircraft exteriors, cruise ship hull artwork, stained glass, furniture (he collaborated with designer Ralh Pucci, among others) and flower shows. In 2008 he collaborated with an Italian tile manufacturer to design the world's largest mosaic mural in Venice, Italy.

Le Batard designed the exterior of Norwegian Getaway.
