= Western School of Technology =

Western School of Technology and Environmental Science

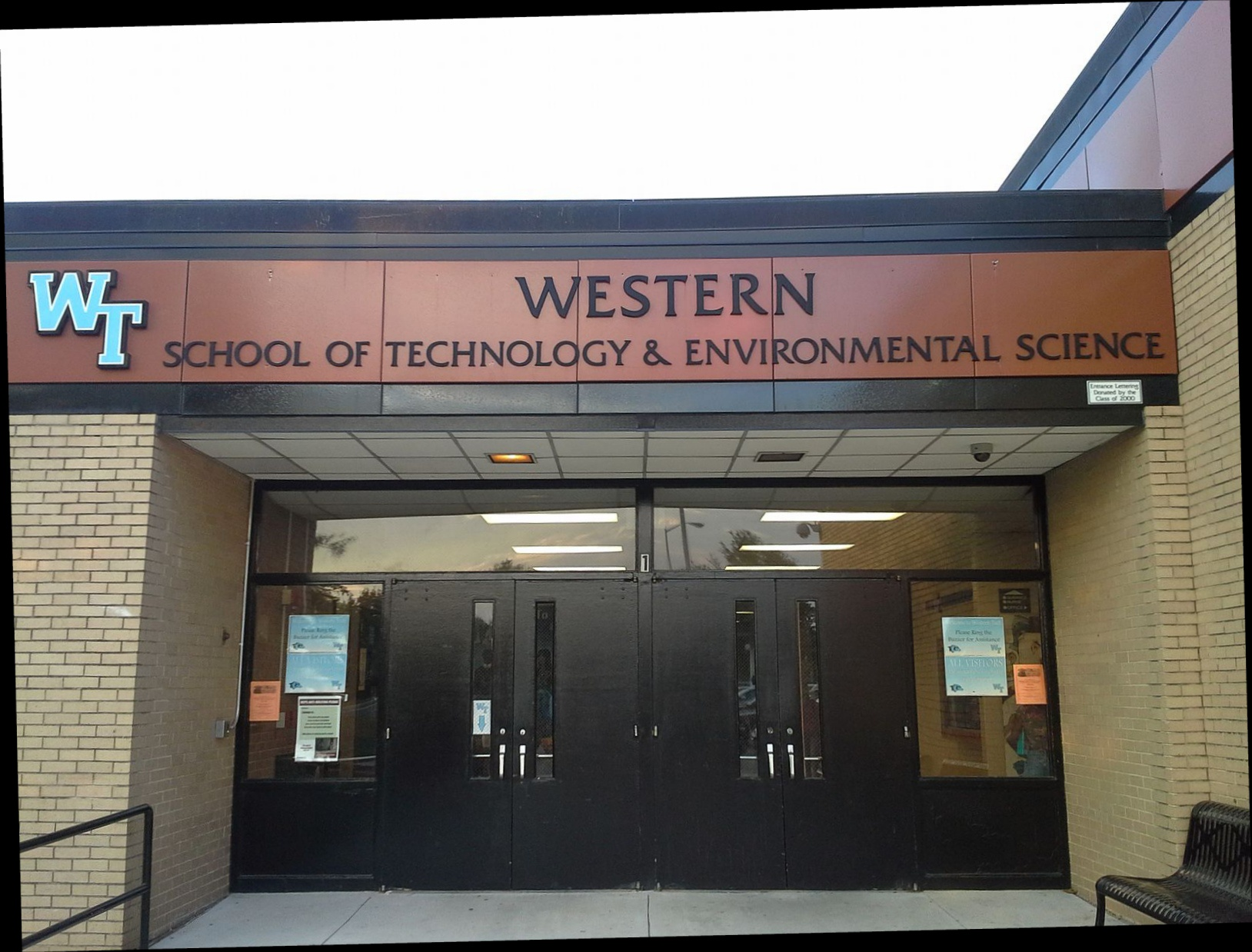

Location
- 100 Kenwood Avenue; Catonsville, Maryland 21228; United States; 39°16′10″N 76°42′45″W

Information
- School type: Public; High School; Magnet School
- Motto: "Be a Western Tech graduate or compete with one"
- Patron saint: Home of the Wolverines
- Established: 1970 (Western Vocational-Technical School); 1993 (Western School of Technology and Environmental Science)
- School district: Baltimore County Public Schools
- Superintendent: Myriam Rogers
- Principal: Jewell Ralph
- Grades: 9–12
- Gender: Co-ed
- Enrollment: 931
- Average class size: 24
- Campus: Suburban
- Colors: Light sky blue, white and black
- Athletics conference: 1A
- Sports: Soccer, football, basketball, lacrosse, volleyball, baseball
- Mascot: Wolverines
- Nickname: Western Tech
- Team name: Western Wolverines
- National ranking: 547
- Publication: Jostens
- Newspaper: Wolverines Newspaper
- Website: westernhs.bcps.org

Western School of Technology and Environmental Science (WSTES), also known as Western Tech, is a public magnet high school in Catonsville, Maryland, United States. The school's main focuses are its twelve magnet programs pertaining to specific careers. In December 2013, Western Tech was named one of six public Blue Ribbon Schools in Maryland for 2014. On September 30, 2014, Western earned its status as a National Blue Ribbon School, becoming the seventeenth school in Baltimore County since 1994 to receive this honor.

== History ==
Western Tech opened as Western Vocational-Technical School in 1970 alongside Eastern Vocational-Technical School, constructed for about $2 million. Students attending a regular high school interested in their school's vocational training programs could attend the schools for more specialized learning in 13 courses, such as automobile mechanics or cosmetology. It accepted students from Catonsville, Woodlawn, and Lansdowne high schools.

In 1993, the school was converted from a technical school to a full high school as a magnet school, alongside several others in the county. It renamed to Western School of Technology and Environmental Science beginning in the 1993–94 school year. It continued its technical programs, with additional environmental science magnets.

On April 11, 2013, at approximately 2:30 a.m., two portable classrooms were engulfed in flames. Over 75 firefighters got the blaze under control by 3:30 a.m. Because smoke entered the main building, the school was closed that day. The cause of the fire is unknown.

== Academics ==
Western School of Technology and Environmental Science received a 72.5 out of a possible 82.5 points (42%) on the 2018–2019 Maryland State Department of Education Report Card and received a 5 out of 5 star rating, ranking in the 99th percentile among all Maryland schools.

Western Tech is currently ranked #6 in Maryland, and #517 among high schools nationally.

Students must apply to Western Tech and the school can only accept a limited number of applicants. Therefore, the admission process is selective and competitive. Students must complete an assessment for the magnet program in which they applied to. Admission is based on these assessments among other criteria, including grades and attendance.

The programs offered are Academy of Health Professions, Automotive Service Technology, Business Management and Finance, Cosmetology, Culinary Arts and Restaurant Management, Environmental Science, Environmental Technology, Graphic/Print Communications Technology, Information Technology (with a choice between the Computer Science or Networking Pathway), Mechanical Construction/Plumbing and Sport Science Academy.

The facilities include a state-of-the-art garage (for Automotive), kitchen (for Culinary), salon (for Cosmetology), and mock hospital (for Health Science).

In 2010, these technologically advanced programs have earned Western the title of "Best School for Hands-on Education" by Baltimore Magazine.

Western Tech currently offers 17 different Advanced Placement courses. Western also offers internships and parallel enrollment for students in the 12th grade.

== Magnet programs ==
Western Tech offers 11 magnet programs for students who are looking for unique interest in career pathways to get them ready for college, and trade school.

Magnet Programs

- Academy of Health Professions
- Automotive Service Technology
- Cosmetology
- Culinary Arts and Restaurant Management
- Environmental Science
- Environmental Technology
- Graphic Print
- Information Technology Artificial Intelligence Pathway, formerly known as Information Technology - Programming
- Information Technology Networking Program
- Mechanical Construction Plumbing
- Sports Science Academy

== Students ==
The 2019–2020 enrollment at the Western School of Technology and Environmental Science was 892 students.

The graduation rate at WesternTech was 89.25% in 1996, 94.96% in 1997, and 94.91% in 1998. From 1999 to 2011, the graduation rate has been greater than 95%. Also, over 95% of students have passed the HSA's. The student enrollment has been as high as 1,070 in 2004 and as low as 434 in 1994.

Ethnicity	Percentage
Asian	12%
Black	69%
Other	19%

Male	Female
48%	52%

Student population
1994	1995	1996	1997	1998	1999	2000	2001	2002	2003	2004	2005	2006	2007	2008	2009	2010	2011	2012	2013
434	639	873	1,018	1,012	1,043	1,037	1,035	1,036	1,040	1,070	1,065	1,042	975	936	885	873	890	890	926

== Athletics ==
Western Tech does not have a field of its own, therefore sports must be played at nearby Community College of Baltimore County (CCBC) or at other schools in Baltimore County.

In 2013, the Western Tech girls basketball team won the A1 Girls State Basketball Championship, beating Dunbar High School with a score of 46–40.

Western Tech supports 15 athletic teams in Maryland Athletic Conference 1A.

- Football
- Soccer
- Baseball
- Basketball
- Volleyball
- Track and Field
- Tennis
- Softball
- Lacrosse
- Indoor Track
- Cross Country
- Golf
- Badminton
- Wrestling
- Cheerleading

=== State championships ===
Volleyball:

- Lesley W. Cooke Sportsmanship Award 2018

Girls Basketball

- 1A 2013

Girls Indoor Track

- Group Events:
  - 1A 4x200 m Relay 2008, 2013
  - 1A 4x400 m Relay 2010, 2012, 2013
  - 1A 4x800 m Relay 2010, 2013
  - 1A 2010
  - 1A 2011
  - 2A 2014
  - 2A 4x200 m Relay 2015
- Individual Events:
  - 1A 500m 2011, 2013
  - 1A 800m 2011, 2013
  - 2A 500m 2014
  - 2A 300m 2014

Girls Outdoor Track

- Group Events:
  - 1A 4x100 Meter Relay 2007, 2008, 2013
  - 1A 4x200 Meter Relay 2007, 2008, 2013
  - 2A 4x200 Meter Relay 2014, 2016
  - 1A 4x400 Meter Relay 2010, 2011, 2012, 2013
  - 1A 4x800 Meter Relay 2010, 2011, 2012
  - 2A 4x800 Meter Relay 2014
- Individual Events:
  - 1A 100m 2007, 2018
  - 1A 200m 2013, 2018
  - 2A 200m 2014
  - 1A 400m 2011, 2012, 2013
  - 2A 400m 2014
  - 1A 800m 2012, 2013
  - 2A 800m 2014
  - 1A 1600m 2011
  - 1A 100 Meter High Hurdles 2006, 2013
  - 1A 300 Meter Low Hurdles 2006, 2007
  - 1A Shot Put 2008

Boys Outdoor Track

- Group Events:
  - 1A 2008
  - 1A 4x100 Meter Relay 2012
  - 1A 4x200 Meter Relay 2010, 2019
  - 1A 4x400 Meter Relay 2008, 2009, 2010, 2013
  - 1A 4x800 Meter Relay 2009
- Individual Events:
  - 1A 100m 1996
  - 2A 100m 2014
  - 1A 200m 2010, 2013
  - 2A 200m 2014
  - 1A 400m 2013
  - 2A 400m 2014
  - 2A 800m 2002
  - 1A 3200m 2008
  - 1A 300 Meter Intermediate Hurdles 2008, 2009
  - 1A High Jump 2006

== Notable alumni ==
- Domonique Foxworth (class of 2004), professional football player
- Joshua Miles (class of 2014), professional football player
