= Highly Questionable =

- Based on: Pardon the Interruption
- Directed by: Erik Rydholm
- Presented by: ESPN
- Starring: Bomani Jones (2013–2021); Pablo Torre (2016–2021); Israel Gutierrez (2017–2021); Sarah Spain (2017–2021); Katie Nolan (2017–2021); Mina Kimes (2017–2021); Domonique Foxworth (2019–2021); Elle Duncan (2019–2021); Mike Golic Jr. (2021); Monica McNutt (2021)
- Country of origin: United States
- Original language: English
- No. of seasons: 9

Production
- Executive producers: ESPN, Erik Rydholm
- Running time: 30 minutes

Original release
- Network: ESPN2 (2011–2015); ESPN (2015–2021)
- Release: September 12, 2011 – September 10, 2021

Related
- This Just In with Max Kellerman

Highly Questionable (stylized as ¿Highly Questionable?; abbreviated HQ) is an American daily sports talk television program on ESPN. Created as a vehicle for former Miami Herald sportswriter and ESPN contributor Dan Le Batard, who also hosted his own radio show for the network, the show premiered on September 12, 2011. It aired on weekdays at 2:30 PM Eastern. The final show was September 10, 2021.

From its premiere until May 10, 2013, the show bore Le Batard's name and was called Dan Le Batard Is Highly Questionable (DLHQ), and from its premiere until March 23, 2015, the show aired on ESPN2. The program was based in Le Batard's hometown of Miami, Florida, and produced via satellite in Washington, D.C. It was created by the same people behind Pardon the Interruption (PTI), on which Le Batard has appeared multiple times as a substitute host.

The show was hosted by Le Batard. His father, Gonzalo "Papi" Le Batard, was his daily co-host until November 2019. After taking a 3-month break, Papi made only occasional appearances. Bomani Jones also co-hosted consistently for 5 years until his departure, and since 2017 a rotating guest served as a second co-host. The arrangement became necessary after Bomani Jones, who had joined the show in 2013, relocated to New York to co-host High Noon with Pablo Torre. After March 2020, during the COVID-19 pandemic in the United States, Jones made frequent co-host appearances (and occasionally acted as Dan's substitute host) from home via Zoom split-screen tele-conferencing, along with other frequently recurring ESPN personalities Pablo Torre, Mina Kimes, Katie Nolan, Israel Gutierrez, Elle Duncan and Domonique Foxworth. Highly Questionable emanated from ESPN's studio at the Clevelander Hotel in South Beach, where Le Batard's radio program is also broadcast. Previously the show taped at a studio set in suburban Miami designed to resemble a stereotypical Miami kitchen. As a tribute to the previous set, a bowl filled with plastic fruit was always on the table where the hosts sat.

On September 9, 2021, it was announced Highly Questionable would be cancelled, with the final episode of the show airing the next day. The show was replaced with This Just In with Max Kellerman.

== History ==
The show was announced on August 19, 2011, as a creative project between Dan Le Batard and the producers of Pardon the Interruption. The show, and the introduction of Le Batard's father Gonzalo to the project, was part of an effort by ESPN to attract more Latino viewers. DLHQ premiered on Monday September 12, 2011 at 4:00 PM Eastern. Beginning in 2012, other ESPN personalities including Bomani Jones and Bill Simmons appeared as contributors to the show.

On May 13, 2013, Le Batard got a second co-host when frequent guest Bomani Jones, who had been based in North Carolina, joined the now-renamed Highly Questionable. In June 2017, Le Batard said that was the moment the show found its footing, as Jones' addition helped it gain enough viewers to avoid what was considered to be a near certain cancellation.

On March 23, 2015, Highly Questionable was moved from ESPN2 to ESPN weekdays at 4:30 PM Eastern, leading into sister shows Around the Horn and PTI.

In May 2017, ESPN announced that Jones would leave HQ in June 2017 while a new show featuring him and Pablo Torre (titled High Noon) was developed. His last show was on Thursday, June 22, 2017, and he received an emotional send-off from both of his colleagues. Since then, the show employed a variety of co-hosts as opposed to a permanent replacement for Jones.

On December 3, 2020, it was reported that Le Batard would be leaving ESPN (and his radio show), though the show would continue without him and Gonzalo. The last show featuring the pair aired on January 4, 2021. Until the final episode on September 10, 2021, the show continued with several ESPN correspondents, including Torre, Jones, Domonique Foxworth, Monica McNutt, Elle Duncan, Clinton Yates, Sarah Spain, Mina Kimes, Katie Nolan, Mike Golic Jr. and Israel Gutierrez, as they questioned and discussed sports issues from their own homes, and/or its studio complexes.

On September 9, 2021, it was announced Highly Questionable would be cancelled, with the final episode of the show airing the next day. The show was replaced with This Just In with Max Kellerman.

== Guest hosts ==
Throughout its run, Highly Questionable needed to employ guest hosts whenever Le Batard was unavailable, such as when he took time off for his wedding and honeymoon. Jon "Stugotz" Weiner, Le Batard's radio co-host, would frequently fill a slot, as would Miami-based journalists like Israel Gutierrez.

Guest hosts became a permanent fixture for the show after Jones left; some of the more frequently seen guests included Sarah Spain, Mina Kimes, Pablo Torre, Domonique Foxworth, Katie Nolan, and Amin Elhassan, among others.

Beginning in the 2019 football season, ESPN's Monday programs began carrying a football-centric series of topics, including Le Batard and Papi broadcasting from Miami with two guest contributors. Usually these spots would be filled by Domonique Foxworth, who joined via satellite from Washington, and Mina Kimes, who joined via satellite from Los Angeles.

In November 2019, Papi took a leave of absence from Highly Questionable in order to get some rest. Le Batard said that after working non-stop for over 50 years it was time for him to take a break. Since November 2019, most of the guest hosts appeared via satellite instead of in-studio. For example, Torre, Jones, and Katie Nolan appeared from ESPN's studio complex at the South Street Seaport, Foxworth and Clinton Yates appeared from Washington, and Sarah Spain appeared from her native Chicago.

== The set ==
The original set for the show was located in Hialeah, Florida just outside of Miami. The set was designed to resemble a 1950s-era Miami/Cuban kitchen, in the spirit of a television sitcom. The set also featured old Le Batard family photos.

In late summer 2014, the show moved to a new set on the second floor of the Clevelander Hotel in Miami's South Beach. The new studio setting was designed as a more conventional set, while retaining Miami-themed colors, and featured a window looking out to South Beach. The new set premiered on September 8, 2014. The Clevelander studios are also used for Le Batard's radio program as well as serving as the home for Miami-based panelists on Around the Horn.

== Segments ==
The show was broken into 4 segments. Each segment utilized a question-answer format, with questions for the non-guest segments coming from fans. Each show began with Le Batard introducing the panel, Jones offering a pithy commentary on one of the discussion topics, and Le Batard telling his father "vamos, Papi," (or more recently "dale, Papi") which kicked off the show.

=== Opening questions ===
A series of viewer-submitted questions began the proceedings. Papi read each of them from an Apple iPad in front of him. When Papi didn't, the producer asked the question, and Le Batard and Jones each took turns addressing the audience with their takes, while Papi chimed in with a random non sequitur. Occasionally, Dan and Papi found questions humorous or ignorant enough in nature that they were not worth answering, and just simply laughed instead. Once in a while, Papi would say something completely ridiculous and potentially damaging; when he did this, a technical difficulty bumper would play for several seconds, and Le Batard would prompt Papi to apologize.

On certain Mondays, particularly during the National Football League regular season, the "Questions" segment would continue into the second segment.

=== Guest interview ===
During the second segment, a pretaped interview with a guest aired. The questions were usually related to a current issue or event in sports, and Dan and Bomani often asked about the guest's life outside of sports. Papi asked the final question, usually about topics unrelated to sports.

On days when no guest was available, one of several things would happen. One of "Papi's famous interview medleys", with highlights from past interviews shown, might have played, or a second set of questions might have been asked. "Do You Question" (see below) also may have served as the second segment, and more and more frequently did serve that purpose.

=== "Do You Question" ===
The third segment was essentially a repeat of the first segment, and was introduced by Jones by saying, "you give us topics and events, we question 'em." The only difference was that they began with "Do you question..." and often featured humorous video clips that did not necessarily have anything to do with sports.

=== "¿Sí o No?" ===
The final segment of the show related to television programming. The three hosts were given the name of a program airing that evening and offered their opinions on whether or not they were intrigued. Each responded with "Sí" or "No" while holding up a placard with that response. Most of the programs were sports-related, but at least one was a general interest program such as a documentary or reality program such as The Bachelor, which Le Batard hated and left the set whenever it was featured. Papi had the on-show reputation for responding, "Sí, sí, I'm very intrigued!" to just about everything, and often came up with odd reasons for doing so, such as a team with a "Latino player" (sometimes an actual Latino player, but other times one with a Spanish-sounding name or even one he completely made up, like "Miguel Verde" or "Bernardo Bishopo") who is going to have a "helluva game" or who will be a "name you'll never forget" (which he promptly forgot), or humorous misunderstandings of the shows in question.

=== The Banana Phone ===
One of the show's most frequently used running gags was the Banana Phone, in which Papi imitated a ringing telephone and picked up the banana out of the plastic fruit bowl to (pretend to) speak to someone on the other end. To further the gag, a cord was attached to the banana.

Often, Papi called his bookie "Juanito," telling him to "put everything" on the team he thought would win. Juanito took bets on virtually any sporting event known to man, from the America's Cup to middle school basketball. Papi was also known to thank Juanito for a tip he allegedly had given him or implying that he had had a role in a certain event's outcome, including horses crashing at the finish line of a race, or other bloopers.

In more recent episodes the gag expanded to having Papi pretend to speak to other people besides Juanito. During the 2017 NBA playoffs, Papi frequently received "calls" from Fred Hoiberg, the head coach of the Chicago Bulls, who complained frequently about traveling calls not being made against Isaiah Thomas of the Boston Celtics; to this effect, "Hoiberg" always "phoned in" when he believed a traveling call anywhere was missed.

The number to call Papi from the Banana Phone was 1-800-BANANA.

=== "Gracias" - End of the show ===
After "¿Sí o No?", the show came to an end with Papi or Dan thanking the viewers for watching. Le Batard followed with his own goodbye, reminding the viewers when to catch the show again and occasionally promoting either his or his co-hosts other TV/radio shows or podcasts. Le Batard's co-host had the last word, saying "Gracias, see ya mañana" or "see ya el lunes", depending on the day of the week (lunes being Spanish for Monday; this was usually said to close the Friday show). After this, there was a brief interlude where something from a previous segment, or from earlier in the show, was revisited humorously before the show cut out.

=== On-set guests ===
Occasionally during the commercial interlude, a special guest would appear on the set. During the use of the kitchen-themed set, the guest could be seen utilizing the kitchen, supposedly without Dan or Gonzalo noticing. On the Clevelander set, the guests appeared in studio, sometimes joining the panel for the "¿Sí o No?" segment. Special guests have included Lil Wayne, Pat Riley, Jason Taylor, Kimbo Slice, Sebastian the Ibis, NBA Hall of Famer Isiah Thomas, Ron Magill, Steven Bauer, Pedro Martínez, Micky Arison, Mike Lowell, Lil Dicky, Robert Smith, and Pat Sajak, among others.

=== "Papi Awards" ===
Since 2014, Highly Questionable presented the "Papi Awards", an end-of-the-year special which consisted of a series of awards based on video clips that were usually visited in "Do You Question." Papi dressed in a tuxedo while Le Batard and Jones served as his co-hosts, and each category had a winner and at least two runners-up. Each "winner" receives the "Golden Banana", a trophy made for the occasion. A constant running gag for the awards was that the winners were not able to receive the award in person for various reasons, so the trophy was held over for each subsequent award. There was no Papi Awards special in 2019, due to Papi's sabbatical from the program. The segment returned for the final time on January 4, 2021, the Le Batards' final episode.
