= Joshua Miles (American football) =

American football player (born 1996)

No. 66, 77
- Position: Offensive tackle

Personal information
- Born: January 4, 1996 (age 30); Baltimore, Maryland, U.S.
- Listed height: 6 ft 5 in (1.96 m)
- Listed weight: 318 lb (144 kg)

Career information
- High school: Western Tech (Catonsville, Maryland)
- College: Morgan State (2014–2018)
- NFL draft: 2019: 7th round, 248th overall pick

Career history
- Arizona Cardinals (2019–2022); Atlanta Falcons (2023)*; New York Giants (2023–2024); Chicago Bears (2025)*; Cleveland Browns (2025)*; Las Vegas Raiders (2025)*
- * Offseason or practice squad member only

Career NFL statistics
- Games played: 18
- Stats at Pro Football Reference

Joshua Miles (born January 4, 1996) is an American former professional football player who was an offensive tackle in the National Football League (NFL). He played college football for the Morgan State Bears.

== Professional career ==
Pre-draft measurables
Height	Weight	Arm length	Hand span	Wingspan	40-yard dash	10-yard split	20-yard split	20-yard shuttle	Three-cone drill	Vertical jump	Broad jump	Bench press
6 ft 5 in (1.96 m)	314 lb (142 kg)	35 5/8 in (0.90 m)	10 3/4 in (0.27 m)	7 ft 0 7/8 in (2.16 m)	5.28 s	1.73 s	2.86 s	4.75 s	8.07 s	36.0 in (0.91 m)	9 ft 1 in (2.77 m)	18 reps
All values from NFL Combine/Pro Day

=== Arizona Cardinals ===
Miles was selected by the Arizona Cardinals with the 248th overall pick in the seventh round of the 2019 NFL draft.

On September 25, 2021, Miles was placed on injured reserve. He was activated on October 16.

On August 30, 2022, Miles was waived/injured by the Cardinals and placed on injured reserve.

=== Atlanta Falcons ===
Miles signed a one-year deal with the Atlanta Falcons on March 31, 2023. He was waived on August 30, and re-signed to the practice squad.

=== New York Giants ===
On October 17, 2023, Miles was signed by the New York Giants off the Falcons' practice squad. He was released on November 20 and re-signed to the practice squad. Following the end of the 2023 regular season, the Giants signed him to a reserve/future contract on January 8, 2024.

Miles was released by the Giants on August 27, and re-signed to the practice squad.

=== Chicago Bears ===
On January 22, 2025, Miles signed a reserve/future contract with the Chicago Bears. He was released on August 25.

=== Cleveland Browns ===
On September 16, 2025, Miles signed with the Cleveland Browns' practice squad. He was released on October 14.

=== Las Vegas Raiders ===
On December 24, 2025, Miles was signed to the Las Vegas Raiders' practice squad. He signed a reserve/future contract with Las Vegas on January 5, 2026.

On April 13, 2026, Miles retired from professional football.
