= Holiday Touchdown: A Chiefs Love Story =

- Genre: Romantic comedy
- Teleplay by: Julie Sherman Wolfe
- Directed by: John Putch
- Starring: Hunter King; Tyler Hynes; Ed Begley Jr.
- Music by: Tommy Fields
- Country of origin: United States
- Original language: English

Production
- Executive producer: Jason T. Reed
- Producers: Jake Relic; Dustin Rikert; Kylie Rohead; Jesse Sisgold; David M. Wulf
- Cinematography: Andrew Rawson
- Editor: Kat Spiess
- Running time: 90 minutes
- Production companies: NFL Films; Skydance Sports; Hallmark Media

Original release
- Network: Hallmark Channel
- Release: November 30, 2024

Holiday Touchdown: A Chiefs Love Story is a 2024 American romantic comedy Christmas television film directed by John Putch. It tells the story of Alana, a Kansas City Chiefs fan whose family is competing to win the team's Fan of the Year contest, which is being judged by Derrick, who has recently moved to Kansas City to work as the Chiefs director of fan engagement. The film stars Hunter King as Alana, Tyler Hynes as Derrick, and Ed Begley Jr. as Alana's grandfather Paul.

== Cast ==
- Hunter King as Alana Higman
- Tyler Hynes as Derrick Taylor, Alana's love interest
- Richard Riehle as Nicholas Young, Alana's maternal grandfather
- Christine Ebersole as Norma Young, Alana's maternal grandmother
- Megyn Price as Leah Higman, Alana's mother
- Abraham Benrubi as Santa Claus
- Diedrich Bader as Hank Highman, Alana's father
- Ed Begley Jr. as Paul Higman, Alana's paternal grandfather
- Jamie Addison as Beth
- Donna Kelce as Barbeque Restaurant Manager
- Meagan Flynn as Courtney
- Rufus Burns as Mitch
- Trent Green as himself
- Mary Beth McDonough as Carole
- Jenna Bush Hager as Emcee
- Kandice Robins as Chatty Customer
- Wes Brown as Pop-Up Bartender

Chiefs players Mecole Hardman, Clyde Edwards-Helaire, Trey Smith, George Karlaftis and Christian Okoye make cameos as themselves, as do head coach Andy Reid, mascot K.C. Wolf, Chiefs team reporter Matt McMullen, Chiefs announcer Mitch Holthus, Kansas City mayor Quinton Lucas, and Chiefs superfan Richard Christy.

== Production and filming ==
The holiday television movie was announced when Hallmark Media joined forces with the Kansas City Chiefs to produce a Christmas NFL-theme movie with Skydance Media's sport division Skydance Sports co-producing.

Filming took place in July 2024, with filming locations at Arrowhead Stadium and other Chiefs facilities as well as Independence, Missouri on the Independence Square.

== Reception ==
Linda Holmes of NPR praised the film for its focus towards sports fans and the sport of football in general, writing "the idea of centering a holiday movie around a family's love of the home team is a pretty good one." John Simmons from OutKick rated the film a 7 out of 10, stating "You can’t go into a Hallmark movie expecting to be blown away by some deeply insightful thematic message. When I watched this movie, I didn’t, and therefore didn’t set myself up for disappointment. But even with those managed expectations, I still left the movie feeling satisfied." Meg James of the Los Angeles Times wrote that the film "mines the real-life phenomenon of multi-generational relationships bound by a shared love of the Chiefs."

== Sequels ==
=== Holiday Touchdown: A Bills Love Story ===
A second "Holiday Touchdown" Hallmark film, A Bills Love Story was released on November 22, 2025, focusing on the Buffalo Bills fanbase.

- Holland Roden as Morgan Quinn
- Matthew Daddario as Gabe DeLuca, Morgan's love interest
- Caroline Aaron as Ricki DeLuca, Gabe's mother
- Steve Schirripa as Frank DeLuca, Gabe's father
- Patti Murin as Cathy Quinn, Morgan's older sister and Jessica's mother
- Abraham Benrubi as Santa Claus
- Tracy Pollan as Joanna Quinn, Morgan's mother
- Joe Pantoliano as Tommy Rossi, Morgan's maternal uncle
- Patrick Mulvey as Jeremy, Cathy's husband and Jessica's father
- Eve Gordon as Mia Ford, Tommy's wife and Morgan's maternal aunt

=== Holiday Touchdown: A Bears Love Story ===
A third "Holiday Touchdown" Hallmark film, A Bears Love Story was released on October 17, 2026, focusing on the Chicago Bears fanbase.

- Lyndsy Fonseca as Avery Clark
- Robert Buckley as Matt Donnelly, Avery's love interest
- Khary Payton as Ron Clark, Avery's stepfather
- Abraham Benrubi as Santa Claus
- Barbara Alyn Woods as Jody Clark, Avery's mother
- Marsha Mason as Darlene Donnelly, Matt's paternal grandmother
- Marilu Henner as Mary
- Tamera Mowry-Housley as Sloane

== See also ==
- List of Hallmark Channel Original Movies
- List of Christmas films
