= Bomani Jones =

American sports journalist (born 1980)

- Born: Bomani Babatunde Jones; August 26, 1980 (age 46); Atlanta, Georgia, U.S.
- Education: Clark Atlanta University (BA); Claremont Graduate University (MA); University of North Carolina, Chapel Hill (MA)
- Presenting career
- Show: Highly Questionable; The Evening Jones, Around the Horn, The Right Time with Bomani Jones, High Noon, Game Theory with Bomani Jones
- Style: Sports radio
- Country: United States
- Website: http://www.bomanijones.com/

Bomani Babatunde Jones (born August 26, 1980) is an American sports journalist. Jones hosts the podcast The Right Time with Bomani Jones, which first premiered in 2018.

From 2004 through 2023, Jones was employed by ESPN. He began as a columnist for ESPN.com, before becoming a contributor to Outside the Lines and Around the Horn in 2010. In 2013, Jones became the co-host of Highly Questionable alongside Dan Le Batard, serving in that role until 2017. From 2015 through 2017, Jones served as a host on ESPN Radio, and from 2018 to 2020 he co-hosted High Noon with Pablo Torre.

Jones was the host of Game Theory for 2 seasons on HBO from 2022 through 2023. He has also written for SB Nation, Salon,AOL and Vanity Fair.

== Early life and education ==
Jones, who is of African American heritage, was born in Atlanta, Georgia. Later he moved to Houston, Texas, attending school in the town of Waller in the Greater Houston area. His economist mother Barbara Ann Posey and political scientist father Mack are professors and activists. Jones graduated from Clark Atlanta University in 2001 with a bachelor's degree in economics. He followed that up with a master's in politics, economics, and business from Claremont Graduate University and a master's in economics from the University of North Carolina at Chapel Hill. He later studied towards a doctorate in economics at UNC, while living in Durham, North Carolina.

== Career ==
Before becoming a sportswriter, Jones worked as a music and pop culture critic, including writing for AOL and Salon.com. From January 2008 to October 2009, he hosted two radio shows in Raleigh: The Three Hour Lunch Break on 620 the Bull and Sports Saturday with Bomani Jones on 850 the Buzz. The shows ended after the radio stations were sold. In January 2010, Jones launched his radio show, The Morning Jones, which was hosted from Durham, North Carolina. Also in 2010, Jones began appearing as a contributor on ESPN's Outside the Lines and a panelist on Around the Horn. The Morning Jones ended on August 30, 2011. Jones later hosted his own internet shows, The Evening Jones and Bomani & Jones on SB Nation's YouTube channel until January 2013.

Beginning in 2012, Jones appeared regularly on Dan Le Batard's ESPN2 show Dan Le Batard Is Highly Questionable, where he discussed major sports stories with Le Batard. Around the same time, he began guest hosting The Dan Le Batard Show with Stugotz radio show on The Ticket Miami on Wednesdays. On May 9, 2013, it was reported that Jones had signed a new four-year contract with ESPN. In May 2013, Jones became co-host of the renamed Highly Questionable, which moved to ESPN in March 2015. Jones remained on Highly Questionable until June 2017, when he left to prepare for a new project with fellow ESPN talent Pablo Torre.

In January 2014, Jones won three consecutive Around the Horn episodes in which he appeared. As of October 30, 2014, he has 104 wins in 373 appearances on Around the Horn. On March 30, 2015, The Right Time with Bomani Jones debuted on ESPN Radio. On September 21, 2015, The Right Time was moved to the 4 to 7 PM time slot. In December 2017, "The Right Time" ceased airing daily on ESPN radio. It reappeared as an ESPN Podcast in April 2018. On June 4, 2018, Jones and Torre co-led the series debut of High Noon on ESPN. On March 13, 2022, Jones began a new show, Game Theory with Bomani Jones, on HBO. Jones has served as an adjunct professor at Duke University and Elon University.

== Personal life ==
His sister is award-winning novelist Tayari Jones.
