= Dan Le Batard =

American journalist (born 1968)

- Born: December 16, 1968 (age 57)
- Education: University of Miami
- Occupations: Sports radio host, sports television personality
- Employer(s): Miami Herald, 790 The Ticket, ESPN Meadowlark Media
- Spouse: Valerie Scheide (m. 2019)

Dan Le Batard is an American newspaper sportswriter, ex-radio host, podcast host and television reporter based in Miami, Florida. He has also worked at ESPN, and for his hometown paper, the Miami Herald, for which he wrote from 1990 to 2016.

Le Batard hosted a daily radio show with Jon Weiner that originated on WAXY in Miami and was carried nationally on ESPN Radio until early 2021. At ESPN, he also co-hosted the televised sports commentary show Highly Questionable with his father and revolving co-hosts. Additionally, he was a frequent contributor to several ESPN programs, serving as a regular replacement host for Pardon the Interruption. Following his departure from ESPN, Le Batard founded the podcast network Meadowlark Media with former ESPN president John Skipper.

== Personal life ==
Le Batard was born to Cuban exile parents, Gonzalo and Lourdes, who moved the family to Central Islip, New York, before settling in Miramar, Florida. Le Batard is also fluent in Spanish, which he learned at home from his parents. During the 2016 exhibition Major League Baseball game in Cuba, Le Batard talked on his radio show about how his family had risked everything to come to the U.S.

On September 13, 2018, Miami Herald reporter and Le Batard's longtime friend Greg "Scoops" Cote published an article announcing that Dan had become engaged to his girlfriend of two years, Valerie Scheide. The article was published without the couple's consent, which caused great embarrassment for Le Batard as he was on the air at the time the news broke. Le Batard and Scheide were wed in November 2019 at a ceremony in Miami.

Dan's brother was Miami-based artist David Le Batard, professionally known as LEBO. On the August 2, 2023 show, Dan revealed to his audience that David had died after a battle with cancer.

== Career ==
=== Miami Herald ===
Le Batard began work at the Miami Herald in 1990 and was a columnist for its sports section. His work for The Herald includes investigations of the football team of his alma mater, the University of Miami.

=== ESPN ===
Le Batard was a frequent contributor to many programs on the ESPN television network. Among others, he was a recurring guest on Outside the Lines, The Sports Reporters, and College GameDay. He also was a regular guest host of Pardon the Interruption, where he was christened "The Hateable Dan Le Batard" due to his sometimes controversial (and usually contrarian) opinions, as well as his unorthodox attire. Hosting duties on PTI have allowed Le Batard the implementation of the catchphrase "Bam!", which he exclaims in various ways at the beginning of each show he guest hosts. Le Batard has a joking rivalry with former PTI stat boy Tony Reali.

In December 2020, Le Batard announced that he would be leaving ESPN, effective January 4, 2021.

==== Radio show ====
Le Batard hosted a morning radio show weekdays with Jon "Stugotz" Weiner on ESPN Radio. Le Batard is known for his self-deprecating humor, which carries over onto the show through running jokes. Le Batard grants very few interviews about his own life, but in a rare one he did with Aventura Business Monthly in Miami in March 2011, he revealed that Tony Kornheiser, who began a long-running radio career of his own in 1992 on Washington D.C.–based WTEM, strongly encouraged him to embark on a career in the same medium, telling him: "It will link [you] to [your] community in a different way [from that of newspapers]. That it will be more intimate, more fun. It's not as lonely as writing. Writing is just you and a computer, and that it's not communal in any way. Radio is much more intimate."

Le Batard prides himself on being the "uncomfortable" sports journalist. He often writes about controversial topics, especially race. Guests on his radio program may be asked questions ranging from the racial undertones of the Michael Vick case to the effect that race has on how players are drafted into the NBA. After writing a column for The Herald on the former topic, Le Batard was featured on Fox News' Hannity & Colmes to discuss the issue and immediately called out the hosts for only inviting non-black people to speak on the subject.

On September 3, 2015, it was announced that the Dan Le Batard Show with Stugotz would move to the 10:00 a.m. to 1:00 p.m. time slot left vacant by the departure of Colin Cowherd from ESPN to Fox Sports where it would remain until Le Batard's own departure from ESPN.

==== Highly Questionable ====
In September 2011, ESPN launched Dan Le Batard Is ¿Highly Questionable? (retitled Highly Questionable in 2013) on ESPN as part of the afternoon "Sports Talk Block." The show originally featured Le Batard and his father, Gonzalo, whom he calls "Papi." Bomani Jones later joined the show as a host in February 2013, accompanying Dan and "Papi" in discussing current sports news and event topics, and later leaving the show in June 2017. Le Batard made his final regular appearance on Highly Questionable on January 4, 2021.

==== Le Batard and Friends ====
In early 2019, ESPN launched a podcast network called The Le Batard and Friends Podcast Network. The network includes original podcasts hosted by Le Batard (one of which is South Beach Sessions, a long-form interview program) and folks from his radio show companions, including Stugotz and the so-called Shipping Container Filled with Frightened Refugees. Other ESPN personalities that are now part of the LAF podcast network include Mina Kimes (The Mina Kimes Show featuring Lenny), Sarah Spain (That's What She Said with Sarah Spain), and Marty Smith (Marty Smith's America The Podcast).

=== Meadowlark Media ===
Following his departure from ESPN on January 4, 2021, Le Batard founded his own digital media company Meadowlark Media, The team recruited former head of ESPN, John Skipper, to become the new network's CEO. Months later, the company entered into a partnership with gambling company DraftKings worth at least $50 million. In November 2021, the company signed a first-look deal with Apple TV+ to produce documentaries and unscripted series.

In January 2022, Skydance Sports set up a partnership with Meadowlark Media for the production of unscripted sports content. One of their projects is Good Rivals, a three-part soccer documentary series, which was released on Amazon Prime Video in November 2022. Another, Mighty Penguins, about a London-based football team of players with Down's Syndrome, premiered at the Tribeca Film Festival in 2023.

=== Controversies ===
==== Baseball Hall of Fame vote ====
In January 2014, it was revealed that Le Batard was the member of the BBWAA who gave his baseball Hall of Fame vote away to sports news site Deadspin allowing them to use it as a public opinion poll. On January 9, 2014, the BBWAA imposed a one-year ban on Le Batard after learning that he did it because of his criticism over the BBWAA's voting process of selecting baseball players, especially concerning players involved in performance-enhancing drug scandals. Le Batard has spoken out against the "moralizing" of the voting. Le Batard was also forever stripped of his Hall of Fame voting privileges. His ESPN colleagues were mixed in their reactions, which ranged from support to condemnation, with some wondering why Le Batard did not use ESPN.com to conduct the vote. Le Batard regretted not delaying the revelation of his involvement with the vote, as it deflected attention away from the announced inductees. He also said he "had a blind spot" about the level his colleagues were hurt by Deadspin's involvement.

==== LeBron James billboards ====
On August 7, 2014, Le Batard was suspended for two days from his duties at ESPN for allegedly taking out a billboard in Akron, Ohio, which read "You're Welcome, Lebron. Love, Miami" and pictured two NBA championship rings. The billboard referred to LeBron James's departure from the Miami Heat and return to the Cleveland Cavaliers. On August 11, 2014, Dan Le Batard addressed his two days off-air was not because of the billboards, but because he was going to fly a plane banner with the (You're Welcome) banner at the homecoming of LeBron Friday (August 9) and do a live radio transmission to "mock the homecoming."

==== Zoo Miami baby hippo ====
In October 2018 Zoo Miami’s Ron Magill suggested naming a baby hippo as part of a fundraiser. If the $10,000 goal could be met, the hippo would be named after Dan Le Batard. In December 2018 it was announced that the baby hippo could not be named in honor of Dan Le Batard. Michael Ryan Ruiz stated that Disney policy would not allow animals to be named after personalities.

But on January 5, 2021—the day after Dan Le Batard's contract ended with ESPN —Zoo Miami officially announced the pygmy hippopotamus had been named Dan Le Batard.

==== Donald Trump's "go back" tweets ====
On July 18, 2019, on his radio show Le Batard criticized then-President Donald Trump's "go back" to the "crime-infested places from which they came" tweets about four minority congresswomen and called ESPN's policy of avoiding politics on its broadcasts "cowardly". Le Batard then missed several days and several segments from his radio show over the course of the next week before eventually meeting with ESPN President Jimmy Pitaro the following week.
