= Jon Weiner =

American sports talk radio host (born 1972)

- Born: Jonathan Brian Weiner; July 29, 1972 (age 54)
- Other name: Stugotz
- Education: Clark University (B.A.)
- Presenting career
- Show: Stu Gotz and Company (2025-current) The Dan Le Batard Show (2004–2025) STUpodity (2019–present)
- Stations: FOX Sports Radio, WAXY (AM)
- Time slot: Monday–Friday; 10 am – 12 pm ET Stu Gotz and Company 3pm-5pm
- Style: Sports talk satire
- Country: United States
- Website: twitter.com/Stugotz790

Jonathan Brian Weiner (born July 29, 1972), known professionally as Stugotz, is an American sports talk radio host based in Miami, Florida. He is best known for his work on The Dan Le Batard Show with Stugotz on ESPN Radio, where he was the co-host to Miami sports journalist Dan Le Batard. He currently hosts the Stugotz and Company” radio show through iHeartMedia.

== Early life ==
Weiner grew up on Long Island in Port Washington, New York. He cites listening to Mike and the Mad Dog as a teenager as his inspiration for pursuing a career in sports talk radio.

Weiner graduated from Clark University in 1995 with a bachelor's degree in English and communications. He played lacrosse while in college. In Clark's first season as a member of the Pilgrim League in 1992, Weiner was named to the league's All-Star Team after finishing second in league scoring with an average 5.8 points per game. Weiner broke Clark school records for season points (58) and season goals (39). He also tied the school record for goals in a game with nine. He is still number seven in all-time goals scored in a career and number ten in career assists. The team finished 8–34 during his career, including a winless season his senior year.

== Broadcasting career ==
After working as an intern for Madison Square Garden with the New York Knicks and New York Rangers, Weiner moved to south Florida and accepted a similar internship with the Miami Marlins and Miami Dolphins. Weiner was part of a group that started WAXY (AM), better known as 790 The Ticket in South Miami, Florida.

Stugotz and Dan Le Batard were named #6 in Talkers.com 2015 list of the 100 most important sports talk show hosts in America. The duo was also ranked #4 on Barrett Sports Media's list of America's top 20 national sports radio shows of 2015. Furthermore, the podcast for The Dan Le Batard Show with Stugotz was at one time the highest performer for sports media conglomerate ESPN. In 2016, the Miami New Times named Stugotz the "Best AM Radio Personality". Given the growing fandom for Stugotz on the radio show, ESPN has featured him occasionally on flagship television programs such as First Take and Highly Questionable. In 2017, The Dan Le Batard Show with Stugotz was moved to ESPN2's daily lineup from 12 p.m. to 1 p.m. ET (since discontinued). Stugotz had a weekly appearance on ESPN's premier program, SportsCenter, at 8:45 a.m. ET every Wednesday as well as a weekly appearance on Golic and Wingo every Tuesday until that show's cancellation. Stugotz is a fan of the New York Jets.

In 2014, The Le Batard Show posted six billboards in Akron that mocked LeBron James for not thanking the fans of the Miami Heat and rejoining the Cleveland Cavaliers. The billboards were funded entirely by Dan Le Batard even though Stugotz promised for a week to contribute. Stugotz's name appeared on the billboards because of these promises.

In July 2023 Stugotz did a 20-minute interview with country music singer Jake Owen thinking he was New York Jets quarterback Aaron Rodgers; despite claiming to be a big Jets fan he seemed to be fooled by their facial resemblance and missed that Owen is about five inches shorter and 70 pounds lighter than Rodgers.

Weiner often mentioned his 'personal record book', with records such as Kevin Durant having no rings as he joined the Golden State Warriors to do so, and Babe Ruth not being a top five Yankee of all time. In November 2024, he published 'Stugotz's Personal Record Book: The Real Winners and Losers in Sports' through Random House Publishing with the help of Dan Stanczyk, a foreword by Dan Le Batard, and rebuttals to his claims by many sports personalities.

Starting in May 2025, Weiner started appearing less on The Dan Le Batard Show with Stugotz, stating he would focus on his own podcast more. In August 2025, he signed a contract with FanDuel and renamed STUpodity to Stugotz and Company.

== Personal life ==
Weiner resides in Parkland, Florida, with his wife Abby and their two daughters. He is the coach of his daughters' lacrosse team, which is part of the Parkland Redhawks Lacrosse League. Additionally, he is co-head coach of the Madskillz Lacrosse Epic Team.
