= Good Rivals =

American sport docuseries

- Genre: Sports documentary
- Directed by: Gabriel Serra
- Starring: Landon Donovan; Rafael Márquez; Brian McBride; Alexi Lalas; Javier Hernández
- Composers: Richardo Weelock; William Russell; Rigoberto Alvarado; Gelo Hau
- Countries of origin: United States; Spain
- Original languages: English; Spanish
- No. of episodes: 3

Production
- Executive producers: John Skipper; Deirdre Fenton; David Ellison; Jesse Sisgold; Jon Weinbach; Dante Möller
- Producers: Lauren Gaffney; Eve Wulf; Grant Wahl; Shaw Brown
- Cinematography: Odei Zabaleta; John Tipton
- Editors: Jeff Tober; Thomas Czupryna; Mike Moss
- Camera setup: Multi-camera
- Running time: 54 mins
- Production companies: Meadowlark Media; Ocellated Media; Skydance Sports; Prime Video Sports

Original release
- Network: Amazon Prime Video
- Release: November 24 – December 1, 2022

Good Rivals (originally titled as Good Neighbors) is a three-part sports docuseries exploring the unique and intense rivalry between the Mexico and United States national men's soccer teams. Produced by Meadowlark Media in association with Ocellated Media, the series is distributed by Prime Video Sports and Skydance Sports. It premiered on Amazon Prime Video on November 24, 2022.

== Summary ==
The docuseries explores the social, political and sporting layers of the rivalry between the United States and Mexico men's national soccer teams, going back to the U.S.'s 24-game losing streak to Mexico from 1937 to 1980. Featuring interviews with players including Landon Donovan and Rafa Márquez, it spotlights recruiting battles between the two countries, and the U.S. victory over Mexico in the 2002 World Cup after years of Mexico dominating the rivalry.

== Cast ==
- Landon Donovan
- Rafael Márquez
- Alexi Lalas
- Javier Hernández
- Frankie Hejduk
- Luis Hernández
- Clint Dempsey
- Hugo Sánchez
- Marcelo Balboa
- Claudio Reyna
- Manuel Negrete

== Episodes ==
No.	Title	Featured matches	Original release date
1	"A Rivalry is Born"	TBA	November 24, 2022
2	"Fresh Stars and Old Curses"	TBA	November 24, 2022
3	"A New Frontier"	TBA	December 1, 2022

== Production ==
In January 2022, Skydance Sports set up a partnership with Meadowlark Media for the production of unscripted sports content. One of their projects was reported to be a soccer documentary series named Good Neighbors, to be released in three parts on Amazon Prime Video around the 2022 FIFA World Cup. The title was later changed to Good Rivals. It is directed by Nicaraguan filmmaker Gabriel Serra.

== Release ==
The official trailer was released on November 3, 2022. The first two episodes premiered on Prime Video on November 24, 2022, and the final episode premiered on December 1, 2022. Episodes were available in both English and Spanish.
