= World Cup Live =

Television series

World Cup Live was a soccer related news and analysis program that aired on ESPN, ESPN2, and ABC every four years during the FIFA World Cup. Lead commentators and specialists dissect worldwide matches both through a live feed and after they have already been played. World Cup Live was created for the 2006 World Cup and continued through the 2010 World Cup. It planned to broadcast the upcoming 2014 FIFA World Cup as ESPN has English-language rights. As for anchors, SportsCenter hosts Dave Revsine and Rece Davis worked with ESPN while Brent Musburger hosted the ABC airings. Advertisements are not shown, as the play does not stop for two forty-five-minute halves, other than a halftime report, during which commercials are aired. Logos are shown on the screen during broadcasting throughout the game, and advertisements from sponsors can be seen before and after the game. Both pregame and post-game segments are included with a large number of games if time between matches permits, and are always aired for USMNT games. World Cup Live has kept this basic format over the past couple of tournaments and plans on continuing for the 2014 World Cup. The show ended after the 2014 FIFA World Cup when Fox Sports acquired the World Cup rights beginning with the 2018 tournament.

== 2006 World Cup Broadcast ==
The shows debut came on June 9, 2006, for the World Cup held in Germany. It usually ran between 12:00 and 00:00 seeing as that was when most games were played and when most viewers would be tuned in. This time slot is known as the Trifecta. During the Trifecta, World Cup Live was shown on ESPN and ABC, however; it was also aired at different times throughout the afternoon on ESPN2. They had a total of forty-seven telecasts, throughout the 2006 tournament. Thirty-two were nightly, twelve were in-between matches and three were pre-game issue. The 2006 edition offered several technological aspects that were meant to make it easier for non-specialists to understand the sciences of each game. A “Shot-Tracker” was used to trace the velocity and power of a kick.

As far as critics were concerned, the broadcasts were seen as successful, however; soccer in America had not yet blossomed to its full potential and that was made obvious. Sponsor: Vonage

== 2010 World Cup Broadcast ==
World Cup Live later returned for the 2010 World Cup in South Africa. The same format was brought back, and specific segments and ideas, such as the “Shot-Tracker,” were also reused. New commentators from ESPN and from global soccer programs such as Ian Darke and Chris Fowler joined the broadcasting team. The use of the Internet also came into effect more so than in 2006. A live feed of the show was available to not only Americans but also a variety of other countries that relied on US broadcasting for their coverage.

== 2014 World Cup Broadcast ==
The 2014 FIFA World Cup was held in Brazil. ESPN had the rights to broadcast the event in English. Therefore, World Cup Live covered all games. Matches were shown uninterrupted by commercials and were commented on and analyzed before, during, and after the match. Qualifying matches that have been shown were aired on ESPN, although when the tournament started, ESPN, ESPN2, and ABC all broadcast games. The games were, once again, available for viewing on ESPN’s website. Because becoming global has played such a large part in broadcasting World Cup Live, the internet has been utilized immensely by ESPN and ABC.

== Personalities ==
These are the personalities that regularly appear on the program.

Giorgio Chinaglia (analyst, 2006)

Ian Darke (analyst, 2010–2014)

Rece Davis (host, 2006)

Efan Ekoku (analyst, 2010–2014)

Julie Foudy (analyst, 2006–2014)

Chris Fowler (host, 2010–2014)

John Harkes (analyst, 2006–2014)

Allen Hopkins (analyst, 2006–2014)

Alexi Lalas (analyst, 2006–2014)

Bob Ley (host, 2010–2014)

Roberto Martínez (analyst, 2010–2014)

Steve McManaman (analyst, 2010–2014)

Brent Musburger (host on ABC, 2006)

Ruud Gullit (analyst, 2010–2014)

Dave Revsine (host, 2006)

Tommy Smyth (analyst, 2006)

Rob Stone (analyst, 2006–2014)

Mike Tirico (host, 2010–2014)

Martin Tyler (analyst, 2006–2014)

Eric Wynalda (analyst, 2006)

== Ian Darke ==
Lead commentator Ian Darke has been a huge part of World Cup Live since 2010. He has continued to work with ESPN both throughout the World Cup and various other tournaments, including the USMNT qualifying matches. His popularity has helped bring in viewers during the off-season and will continue to do so in 2014. He has stated before that he enjoys working with ESPN and American broadcasting, such as World Cup Live, and also looks forward to contributing to commentating on 2014's airings of the show. In past interviews, Darke has said that he respects America's ability to broadcast soccer, and he enjoys helping it become a bigger part of American television. He will work with World Cup Live and ESPN but strongly believes that he will continue to work more with his homeland: Great Britain.
