= Maryland High School Assessments =

Standardized tests in Maryland, United States

The Maryland High School Assessments (HSA) are standardized tests that measure school and individual student progress toward the High School Core Learning Goals of the U.S. state of Maryland, which were established after passing of the No Child Left Behind Act. Passing the HSA is one of several graduation requirements beginning with the graduating class of 2009. The assessments consist of three timed exams, which are English 10, Biology, and Algebra/Data Analysis. The exams are usually held at the end of their corresponding courses. Each of the exams contains both multiple choice and written response questions. As of 2009, Maryland has eliminated written response and made it a long series of multiple choices. This test is considered by many students to be easy, and some think that it places too much emphasis on just a few topics. Beginning with the class of 2012, the American Government HSA would no longer be a graduation requirement. The last administration of the Government HSA was during May 2013.

There are three ways for a student to pass the HSAs. One way is to earn the passing score on each exam. The passing scores for the three HSAs are:

- English 10 - 396
- Algebra/Data Analysis - 412
- Biology - 400

In addition, a student may still be eligible for graduation if he/she does not meet the passing score. The first option, the combined-score option, requires that they earn a combined 1208 on all three assessments. The second alternative option allows the student to complete a Bridge Project for Academic Validation if they do not pass the HSA in that subject area.
