= Michele Steele =

ESPN reporter

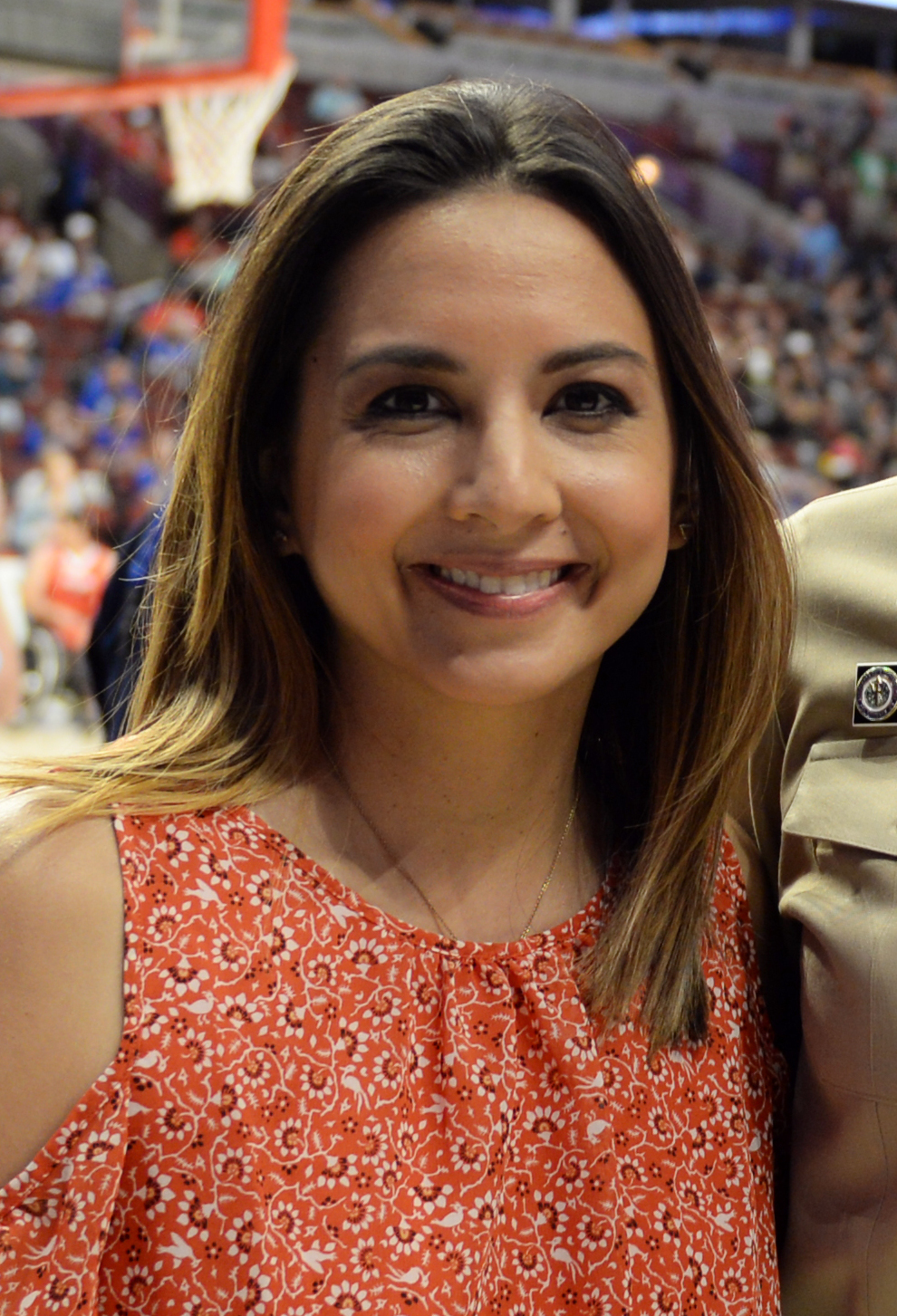
- Born: October 2, 1978 (age 47)
- Education: University of Illinois
- Occupation: ESPN
- Title: SportsCenter anchor and reporter

Michele Steele (born October 2, 1978) is an American television anchor and reporter for The Big Ten Network

== Early years ==
She attended the University of Illinois, where she earned a bachelor's degree in economics and Columbia University, where she earned a master's degree in journalism.

== Career ==
Steele was a daily contributor for Forbes on Fox and a senior reporter for Forbes’ video-on-demand service. She was later hired as the only full-time sports reporter for Bloomberg Television. On December 2, 2011, it was announced that she would leave Bloomberg to join ESPN. At ESPN, she worked as a cross-platform anchor and reporter based in Chicago, primarily doing live remote reports across major sports.

On July 17, 2025, Steele announced she was leaving ESPN after 14 years; her final day was August 1, 2025.
