= Sarah Spain =

American sports reporter (born 1980)

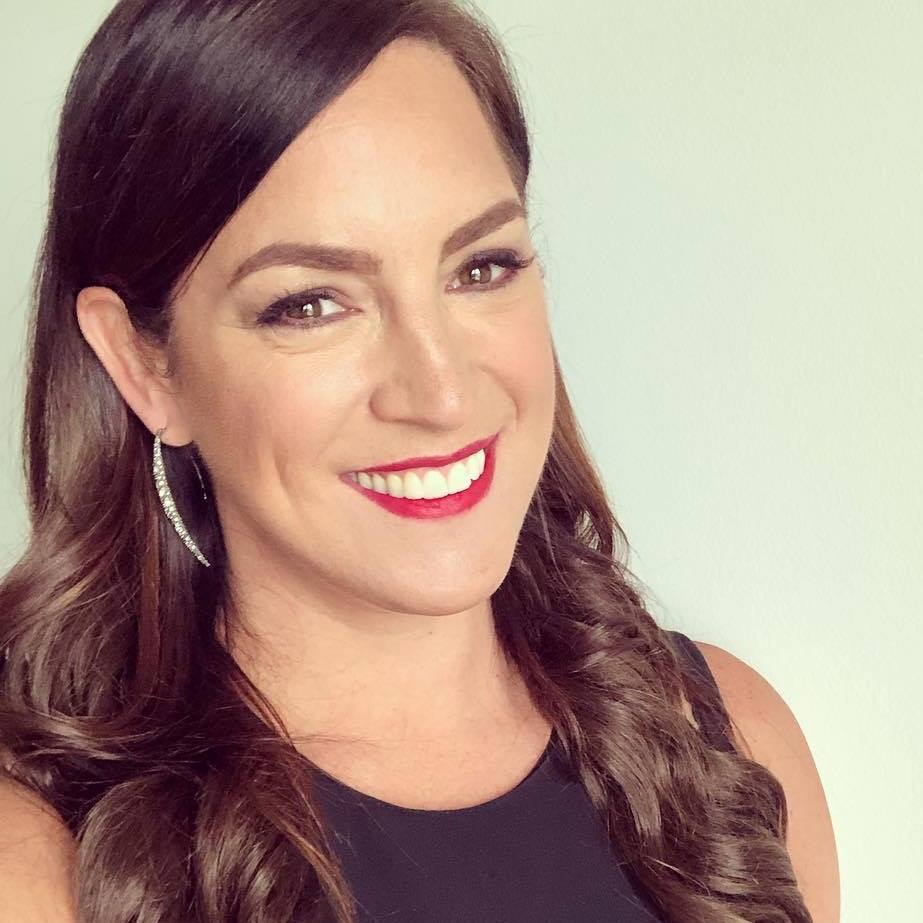
- Spain in December 2020
- Born: Sarah Colby Spain; August 18, 1980 (age 46); Cleveland, Ohio, U.S.
- Education: Cornell University
- Occupation: Sports reporter
- Years active: 2009–present
- Employer: ESPN
- Spouse: Brad Zibung (m. 2016)

Sarah Colby Spain (born August 18, 1980) is an American sports reporter. She hosts the daily iHeart women's sports podcast "Good Game with Sarah Spain," is the co-author of the book "Runs In The Family," and works as an espnW "talent." Previous jobs including ESPN television personality, ESPN podcast and radio host, espnW columnist, and occasional SportsCenter reporter.

== Early life and education ==
Spain was born in Cleveland, Ohio, and raised in Lake Forest, Illinois.

In 1998, as a senior at Lake Forest High School, Spain was the MVP and captain of her track and field, field hockey and basketball teams. Spain attended Cornell University, where she majored in English. She was a heptathlete on the Cornell Big Red track and field team, for which she was co-captain her senior year.

== Super Bowl XLI ==
Spain first gained widespread attention in 2007 when she made a post on eBay offering to be someone's "date" to Super Bowl XLI, in which the Chicago Bears played the Indianapolis Colts. She was living in Los Angeles at the time and, expecting to go to the game with friends, had purchased a plane ticket to Miami. However, her friends decided they couldn't afford to go, leaving Spain solo and without a game ticket. She described the auction as a stunt to get media attention, with the hope that a company would try to gain publicity by sponsoring her attendance at the Super Bowl. Word of the auction reached Unilever, the makers of Axe Body Spray, which covered Spain's costs to attend the game and in turn began a media campaign to "see how many guys would do the same thing for a chance to see their team play."

Spain states that criticisms of the Super Bowl stunt that contend she sexualized herself for the purpose of drawing attention from the media misinterpret both her actions and motives.

== Career ==
Before joining ESPN, Spain worked for Fox Sports Net, MouthpieceSports.com, ChicagoNow.com and was the recurring guest-host of WGN's radio show called ChicagoNow Radio. Spain also worked as a sideline reporter for the Big Ten Network and hosted the Coors Light Fantasy Players Minute. She was one of the original co-hosts of the WGN-TV show Chicago's Best, with Ted Brunson and Brittney Payton. She joined ESPN 1000 in Chicago in 2010 and signed on as a writer for espnW.com in October of the same year.

On January 23, 2015, ESPN announced that it was launching a new radio show called Spain & Prim with Spain and anchor Prim Siripipat as the co-hosts. In January 2016, Spain, Jane McManus and Kate Fagan launched a new national ESPN Radio show, The Trifecta, and Spain launched her own ESPN podcast, That's What She Said. Spain has appeared on a variety of ESPN television shows, including: His & Hers (formerly Numbers Never Lie), Olbermann, Mike & Mike, The Dan Le Batard Show with Stugotz, First Take, The Sports Reporters, "Highly Questionable" and Outside The Lines. On February 25, 2016, Spain made her first appearance on ESPN's Around the Horn. In September 2016, Spain inked a new multi-year deal with ESPN and launched a national ESPN Radio show, Izzy & Spain, with co-host Israel Gutierrez. In 2017, she hosted Fantasy Football Island with Mike Golic Jr.

In 2018, Spain and co-host Jason Fitz (a former member of The Band Perry) launched the national radio show Spain & Fitz. In 2019, Fitz moved to mornings, and the show (with rotating co-hosts) was renamed Spain & Company. In August 2020, Fitz returned as co-host of the evening broadcast, again known as Spain & Fitz. The Spain & Fitz show ended on December 1, 2022.

On March 1, 2021, the Chicago Red Stars of the National Women's Soccer League announced that Spain had joined the women's soccer team's ownership group. She was bought out when Laura Ricketts' investor group purchased the team in September 2023. In early 2025 Spain become an investor in USL W League club Minnesota Aurora FC, and she and her "Good Game with Sarah Spain" listeners helped the Aurora raise $830,000 during the women’s soccer team’s second round of community ownership fundraising.

Spain launched the first and only daily women's sports podcast, "Good Game with Sarah Spain" in July 2024. The show was nominated for "Best Sports Podcast" at the 2025 Ambies Awards for Excellence in Audio, and Spain was honored at the 2025 iHeartPodcast Awards with the Social Impact Award for her work championing equity in sports coverage, equal pay for female athletes, and investment in women's sports. Spain also does thrice-daily women's sports reports for all 500 national iHeart radio stations. In June of 2025 Spain's first book, "Runs In The Family," was released via Simon & Schuster, co-written with Raiders running backs coach Deland McCullough.

== #MoreThanMean ==
In 2016, Spain, along with Chicago sports radio host Julie DiCaro, appeared in a video entitled "More Than Mean," in which unsuspecting, ordinary men read real, degrading tweets directed to Spain and DiCaro to them while sitting face-to-face. The video was meant to highlight the sexual harassment, unjust criticism, rape threats, and death threats that female sportscasters face online simply for doing their jobs. The four-minute video, produced by Just Not Sports and One Tree Forest Films, won a 2016 Peabody Award in the Public Service category.

== Accolades ==
- Crain's Chicago 40 Under 40 (2017)
- Peabody Award (2017)
- Gracie Awards (2016, 2017)
- Sports Clio Grand Award (2016)
- Deadline Club Award (2018)
- Sports Emmy Awards (2018, 2018)
- Dan Jenkins Medal for Excellence in Sportswriting (2019)
- iHeartPodcast Awards Social Impact Award (2025)
