= John Skipper =

American businessman

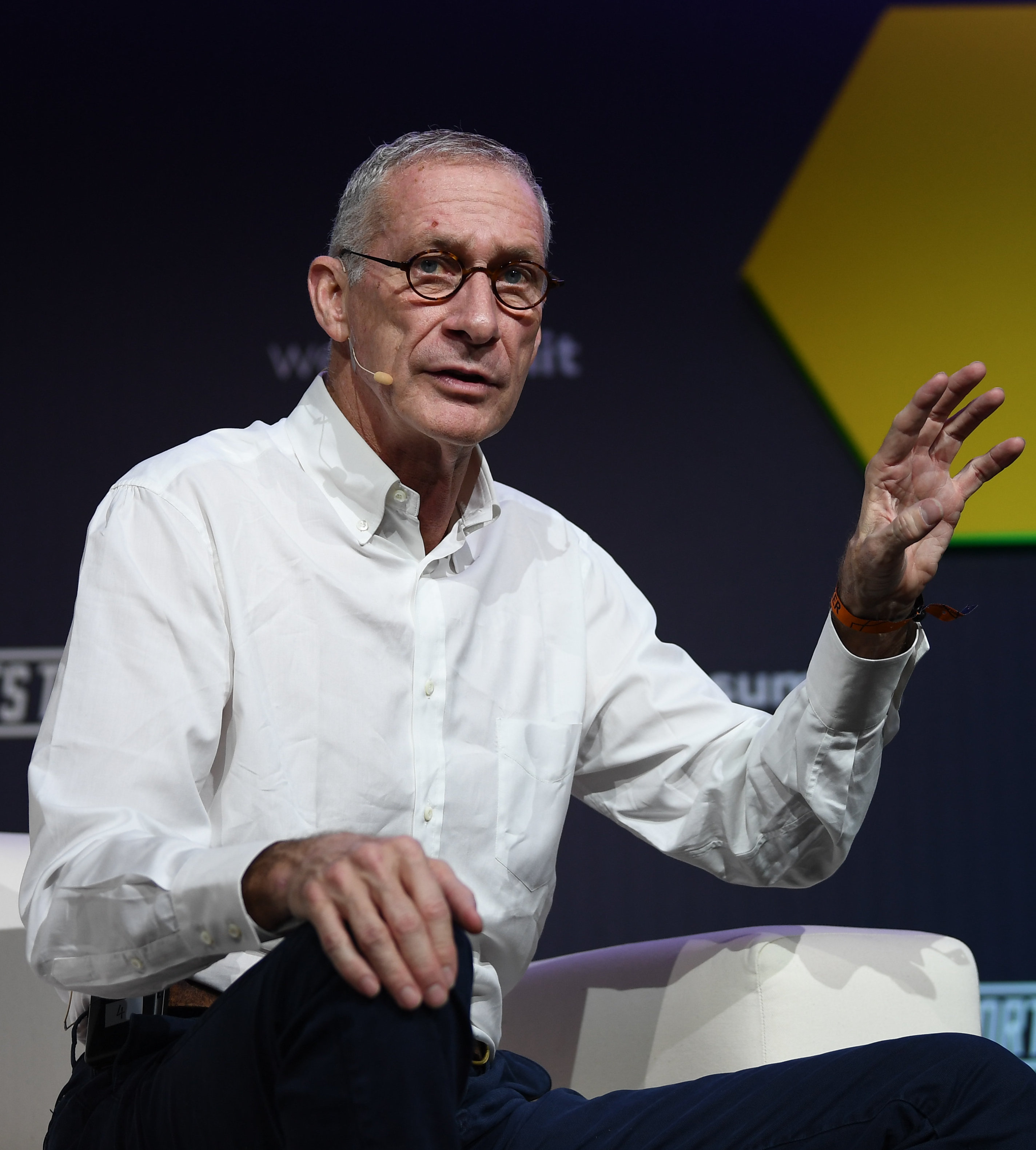
- Skipper in 2018
- Born: Lexington, North Carolina, U.S.
- Education: UNC-Chapel Hill; Columbia University
- Occupation: Executive chairman of DAZN Group
- Known for: Tenure as president of ESPN, DAZN Group, co-founder of Meadowlark Media
- Children: 2

John Skipper is an American television executive, former executive chairman of DAZN Group, former president of ESPN, and co-founder of Meadowlark Media.

== Career ==
=== Education and early career ===
Skipper attended Lexington Senior High School in Lexington, North Carolina. He then attended UNC-Chapel Hill and earned a bachelor's degree in English literature. After receiving his master's degree in the same field from Columbia University, he went to work for Rolling Stone, beginning as an executive assistant before being promoted. He also worked for Us and Spin before becoming senior vice president of Disney Publishing Group.

=== ESPN ===
In June 1997, Skipper became senior vice president and general manager of ESPN the Magazine. In October 2005, he was named as executive vice president of content. On January 1, 2012, he became president of ESPN Inc. and co-chairman of Disney Media Networks. In 2017, Skipper's contract with ESPN's parent company, Disney, was extended through 2021. In his time as president, Skipper was noted for negotiating large television rights contracts for sporting events, including a nine-year, $12 billion deal with the National Basketball Association and a $7.3 billion deal for the College Football Playoff, as well as all four tennis Grand Slams and golf's Masters Tournament.

On December 18, 2017, Skipper revealed that he had been struggling with substance addiction, and announced that he would be resigning as president of ESPN in order to focus on treatment. John Skipper told The Hollywood Reporter that a cocaine extortion attempt led to his ESPN departure. His predecessor George Bodenheimer served as acting chairman of the company during the transition to new leadership. In the wake of Skipper's announcement, The New York Times reported that he "didn't have a reputation for partying or erratic behavior" among coworkers at ESPN or confidants in his personal life.

After his resignation, many current and former ESPN staffers, including Jemele Hill, Michele Steele, and Keith Olbermann, applauded Skipper's past work and the decision to focus on his personal life.

=== DAZN Group ===
On May 8, 2018, it was announced that Skipper had been hired as executive chairman of DAZN Group, a British international sports media company. Skipper will operate out of New York City. The company subsequently announced plans to launch its international sports streaming service DAZN in the United States later in the year, anchored by a deal with British promoter Eddie Hearn to hold major boxing events in the U.S. to carry on DAZN.

Skipper explained that he wanted the service to eventually be a larger competitor to entities such as ESPN and compete for more significant sports rights, but that they wanted to "build our brand in this country, expose the quality of our technology and start to meet people." Of his personal condition, Skipper added that "I'm in a great place. I am excellent, quite healthy. I think you can tell that. I have a level of acceptance and enthusiasm going forward."

=== Meadowlark Media ===
In January 2021, Skipper joined former ESPN personality Dan Le Batard to launch Meadowlark Media, a content company focused on sports. He will remain at his position at DAZN. The company most recently signed a deal with Apple TV+.

== Legacy ==
Skipper's time as President of ESPN received both praise and criticism. He was admired for his strong support of journalism. The Ringer wrote that "he knew quality" and "spoke a language that editorial people could understand." He was credited for taking chances on ambitious projects like Grantland, FiveThirtyEight, The Undefeated, and 30 for 30.

Sports Illustrated wrote that Skipper made ESPN "gobs of cash ... but he also made the network smarter and sharper." Skipper "championed soccer and the NBA, realizing that ESPN, armed with its many affiliates and platforms, could get more out of broadcast rights than any of its competitors could."

He was also praised for pushing ESPN to become "more diverse on air and online when it came to both gender and race."

During Skipper's tenure, ESPN lost nearly 15% of its subscribers as consumers moved to streaming and over-the-top (OTT) options and laid off more than 500 employees as all traditional media companies were impacted by cable's decline. Additionally, ESPN's TV ratings declined significantly across the board due to the cord-cutting and the network endured criticism from new competitors over the declining quality of its programming.

Skipper's 2014 disregard of eSports as a "real sport", referring to them as a "competition" instead, has been negatively noted by various websites.

== Personal life ==
Skipper is divorced with two adult sons and lives in Manhattan. In 2018, he began dating Venezuelan fashion entrepreneur Carmen Busquets.
