= Katie Nolan =

American sports personality (born 1987)

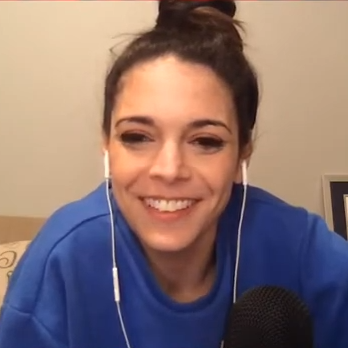
- Nolan in 2021
- Born: Katherine Beth Nolan; January 28, 1987 (age 39); Framingham, Massachusetts, U.S.
- Education: Hofstra University (BA)
- Occupations: Television host; podcast host; radio host; comedian; internet personality
- Years active: 2011–present
- Notable credit(s): Crowd Goes Wild; No Filter with Katie Nolan; Touchdown in Israel; Garbage Time with Katie Nolan; NFL Films Presents; The Garbage Time Podcast with Katie Nolan; SportsCenter on Snapchat; Always Late w/ Katie Nolan; Sports? with Katie Nolan podcast
- Partner: Dan Soder (2020–present)

Katherine Beth Nolan (born January 28, 1987) is an American sports media personality, podcaster, and host. She currently hosts the SiriusXM podcast Casuals, as well as the radio show Fan Service.

Nolan formerly hosted a weekly ESPN podcast called Sports? With Katie Nolan, Always Late with Katie Nolan on ESPN2, and Garbage Time with Katie Nolan on Fox Sports. She won a Sports Emmy Award in 2016 for Garbage Time and was nominated for another in 2019 and 2020 for Always Late. She has been a commentator for Apple TV+'s Friday Night Baseball and created short-form content at NBC Sports.

== Early life ==
Nolan was raised in Framingham, Massachusetts. In 1997, at age 10, Nolan won the gold medal in rhythmic gymnastics at the Junior Olympics. She graduated from Framingham High School in 2005, and earned a Bachelor of Arts in Public Relations with a minor in Dance from Hofstra University in 2009.

== Career ==
In 2011, while bartending in Boston at the White Horse Tavern, Nolan started a blog called Bitches Can't Hang, which focused on pop culture and news. At that time, Nolan also began working with Guyism, part of the Fox Sports Yardbarker network, where she produced and hosted the YouTube series Guyism Speed Round. In her videos, she delivered a monologue of comedic and sarcastic one-liners in the style of Saturday Night Live's Weekend Update. In an interview with GQ in 2018, Nolan expressed regret for how Bitches Can't Hang and her "being mean about women" jump-started her career.

=== Fox Sports ===
In August 2013, Nolan joined Fox Sports 1 as a digital correspondent for Crowd Goes Wild, a sports/entertainment talk show hosted by Regis Philbin. Nolan also hosted the FoxSports.com web series No Filter with Katie Nolan. A September 2014 video featuring commentary on the Ray Rice domestic violence incident was picked up by The New York Times and received praise in multiple media outlets. In January 2015, Nolan appeared as a panelist on an episode of The Nightly Show with Larry Wilmore.

Nolan was formerly the host of the weekly Fox Sports 1 show Garbage Time with Katie Nolan, which premiered on March 15, 2015. Deadspin praised Nolan's April 12, 2015 episode where she criticized the blog posting titled "How to land a husband at the Masters", which had appeared on a fellow Fox reporter's blog. Garbage Time won a Sports Emmy for 'Outstanding Social TV Experience' on May 10, 2016.

In September 2016, Nolan began hosting NFL Films Presents, airing on Fox Sports 1. NFL and Fox Sports 1 made a joint decision to choose Nolan as the new host. She was the social media reporter for Super Bowl LI.

On February 23, 2017, it was announced that Garbage Time would either be retooled from its current format, or Fox Sports would find a new hosting vehicle for Nolan. After seven months without a show, Nolan left Fox Sports in September 2017.

=== ESPN ===
On October 4, 2017, ESPN announced the hiring of Nolan, who would appear across ESPN studio programming and have a digital presence. She made her debut as a guest panelist on ESPN's Highly Questionable on October 19, 2017; she has since guest-hosted that show several times, and appeared on the sister radio show The Dan Le Batard Show with Stugotz. She has said she likes going on Highly Questionable.

In early November 2017, it was announced that Nolan would be doing a podcast with ESPN beginning in January in addition to a digital show later. In November, she began as one of the hosts of SportsCenter on Snapchat.

In 2018, Nolan began hosting a weekly ESPN podcast, Sports? with Katie Nolan and in 2020 was shifted into a biweekly show. In September 2018, her ESPN+ series Always Late with Katie Nolan launched; a 'best of the year' episode aired on the main ABC network on December 30, 2018. In 2019, the show moved to ESPN2 and the ESPN app, with Nolan citing that she and her staff could post more show clips to social media, as being confined to ESPN+ restricted the amount of the program which could be posted to free venues.

Always Late was canceled in 2020. Nolan's contract was subsequently renewed for one year at 60% reduced rate. On September 29, 2021, Nolan announced her departure from ESPN.

=== Sirius XM ===
In January 2025, Nolan launched a new sports podcast produced by SiriusXM, Casuals. In November 2025, Nolan expanded her presence at SiriusXM to host Fan Service on Mad Dog Sports Radio, a live weekday call-in show.

=== Other work ===
In December 2015, Nolan teamed up with United Airlines for a new web-based series of videos titled "Big Metal Bird", which explains some of the inner workings of various facets of United Airlines. The premiere episode debuted on December 15, 2015, and explained how United's baggage handling system operates. Future episodes are intended to address customer feedback that United has received.

Nolan has appeared in three episodes of the Comedy Central program Drunk History. On October 18, 2016, she narrated the story of Theodore Roosevelt's campaign for rule changes in football due to the violence of the game in the early 1900s. On February 13, 2018, she narrated the story of feminist icon Gloria Steinem. On January 30, 2019, she talked about the Black Sox Scandal involving the fixing of the 1919 World Series.

She joined NBC Olympics in time for the 2022 Winter Olympics, which began on February 3, 2022.

Nolan joined the broadcast team for Apple TV's Friday Night Baseball starting in April 2022 in a one-season experiment.

In 2024, Nolan appeared as a contestant and finalist in Celebrity Jeopardy!. In 2026, she returned for Celebrity Jeopardy! All Stars.

== Personal life ==
In December 2022, Nolan announced her engagement to comedian Dan Soder. In 2025, she said they parent a dog, have not started planning their wedding but may in the near future and do not see themselves having children.
