= The Dan Le Batard Show with Stugotz =

U.S. sports talk radio show

The Dan Le Batard Show
- Genre: Sports talk
- Running time: ~3 hours
- Country of origin: United States
- Language: English
- Home station: WAXY (2004–2019); WQAM (2019–2021); ESPN Radio (2013–2021); Independent (January 4, 2021–June 3, 2021); DraftKings (June 4, 2021–present)
- TV adaptations: Fusion TV (2015–2016); ESPNU (2015–2018); ESPNews (2018–2020); ESPN+ (2020); YouTube (2021–2024); DraftKings Network (May 2023–2024); Peacock (2024–present); NBCSN (2025–present)
- Starring: Dan Le Batard; Jonathan Zaslow
- Announcer: Gonzalo Le Batard
- Produced by: Roy Bellamy; Mike Ryan Ruiz; Chris Cote; Anthony Calatayud; JuJu Gotti; Luis Montejo; Jeremy Taché; Jessica Smetana
- Recording studio: The Elser Hotel Miami Beach, Florida
- Original release: September 1, 2004
- Opening theme: A mashup mix featuring the Blade theme, Brooklyn Bounce's "This is the Real Bass", and DMX's "Party Up (Up in Here)"
- Website: Le Batard AF
- Podcast: Podcast on Spotify

The Dan Le Batard Show is a syndicated sports talk show hosted by Dan Le Batard broadcast out of Miami. It was also carried on many ESPN Radio Network affiliates nationwide and simulcast nationally on various ESPN platforms until the show's departure from ESPN in January 2021. The show currently airs on Peacock, and NBCSN.

The show features commentary on the day's sports news, perspective on other news stories, interviews with sports analysts and athletes, as well as pop culture. The hosts are known for their self-deprecating humor, which carries over through running jokes.

== History ==
Show logo from 2013-January 2021

The Dan Le Batard Show with Stugotz first aired on September 1, 2004, heard on AM 790 WAXY. After running for nine years on local radio, The Dan Le Batard Show debuted on ESPN Radio on September 30, 2013.

On February 14, 2007, the week of the 2007 NBA All-Star Game, former Miami Heat player Tim Hardaway appeared on the show. When asked if he would be accepting of a gay teammate, such as retired NBA center John Amaechi, Hardaway replied: "First of all, I wouldn't want him on my team." Hardaway continued, "You know, I hate gay people, so I let it be known," Hardaway said. "I don't like gay people and I don't like to be around gay people. I am homophobic. I don't like it. It shouldn't be in the world or in the United States." NBA commissioner David Stern, upon learning of the remarks Wednesday, banished Hardaway from All-Star weekend in Las Vegas. Following the comments, Hardaway apologized and attended counseling. He has also made public appearances supporting gay rights, including one in El Paso, Texas in response to an attempted recall.

In early 2015, it was announced that the show would be televised on Fusion starting May 19, 2015. After the departure of Colin Cowherd from ESPN, the network moved the time slot of the show into the 10 AM to 1 PM slot formerly occupied by The Herd with Colin Cowherd, and moved the live simulcast to ESPNU, with the Fusion broadcast shifting to a tape delay from 1 to 4 PM. On May 18, 2016, Fusion aired the show for the last time as the year-long contract with ABC/Disney was expired and was not renewed.

The TV portion of the show then remained solely on ESPNU with the show airing live from 10 AM to 1 PM with no tape-delay. On January 10, 2017, the final hour of the show began simulcasting on ESPN2, but in July 2017, the show's final hour returned to airing on ESPNU. On April 2, 2018, the show's simulcast moved to ESPNews. The show was heard in the Miami area Monday through Friday from 9 AM to 1 PM ET on WAXY AM 790 "The Ticket" and nationally on ESPN Radio from 10 AM to 1 PM.

In February 2017, Magic Johnson was named as the president of basketball operations of the Los Angeles Lakers. Le Batard then questioned his qualifications and cited less than successful ventures into both NBA coaching and television broadcasting. Other ESPN commentators took offense to Le Batard's accusations that Johnson was unqualified and also suggested that race played a part in the former's accusations, including Keyshawn Johnson, LZ Granderson, and Michael Wilbon, while Jorge Sedano defended Le Batard as not prejudiced. In 2017, actor Michael Rapaport called out Le Batard on Twitter about his comment on Magic Johnson, and they continued a dispute on other podcasts.

In July 2020, it was announced that The Dan Le Batard Show would be reduced from three to two hours on ESPN Radio starting August 17, 2020. On August 14, 2020, Le Batard and executive producer Mike Ryan announced via podcast that the new show format would consist of the LOUR (local hour), a Digital Hour called "The Big Suey", the two nationally broadcast hours, and a "post game show" segment. On December 3, 2020, ESPN announced that the radio show would be leaving ESPN entirely on January 4, 2021. Le Batard called the parting mutually amicable.

Dan Le Batard and John Skipper formed Meadowlark Media following the departure from ESPN. The podcast presented a 24-hour live stream from June 4, 2021, to June 5, 2021, to formally introduce the venture.

On June 18, 2026, Dan Le Batard announced that the show would be renamed The Dan Le Batard Show, dropping "with Stugotz" from the title following Jon "Stugotz" Weiner's departure to launch his own podcast network.

== Cast ==
Le Batard and Stugotz interact throughout the show with producers Mike Ryan Ruiz, Roy Bellamy, Billy Gil, Chris Cote, Jessica Smetana, Anthony (Tony) Calatayud, Lucy Rohden, Juju Gotti, Luis Montejo, and Jeremy Taché. A Chelsea supporter, Ruiz formerly co-hosted Chelsea's official American podcast, Chelsea Mike'd Up, with former show producer Chris Wittyngham.

Currently, Le Batard is joined on-air by Greg Cote of the Miami Herald on Tuesdays with the common appearance from Amin Elhassan. ESPN personalities (including Elhassan, Sarah Spain, Domonique Foxworth, Mina Kimes, Katie Nolan, Bomani Jones, Marty Smith, Jorge Sedano, Izzy Gutierrez, and others) made regular guest hosting appearances when the show aired on ESPN Radio. The show used to include the previously mentioned Wittyngham, show booker Allyson Turner, former executive producer Marc Hochman, and "Old Money" Charlie Hulme (who worked as part of the television production team alongside Lorenzo Rodriguez).

On November 8, 2020, Chris Cote announced on his personal Twitter account that he was part of ESPN's mass layoffs. Three days later, Le Batard announced that Cote would be rehired back on the show as his assistant with a raise in salary, which he would be paying.

On February 17, 2022, Mike Ryan Ruiz announced on his personal Twitter account that he would be stepping aside as executive producer of the show, but he would still be around plenty. The show has yet to formally announce a new executive producer.

On April 7, 2023, the final show was recorded in the longtime studio at The Clevelander.

== Former Cast ==
On October 17, 2025, Gil participated in his final show, leaving for an executive position at Spotify/The Ringer (website).

On June 2, 2026, Lucy Rohden departed The Dan Le Batard Show and Meadowlark Media to launch her own college football media brand, CFBLucy.

On June 19th, 2026, Mike Fuentes departed The Dan Le Batard Show and Meadowlark Media.
