= Mina Kimes =

American sports journalist (born 1985)

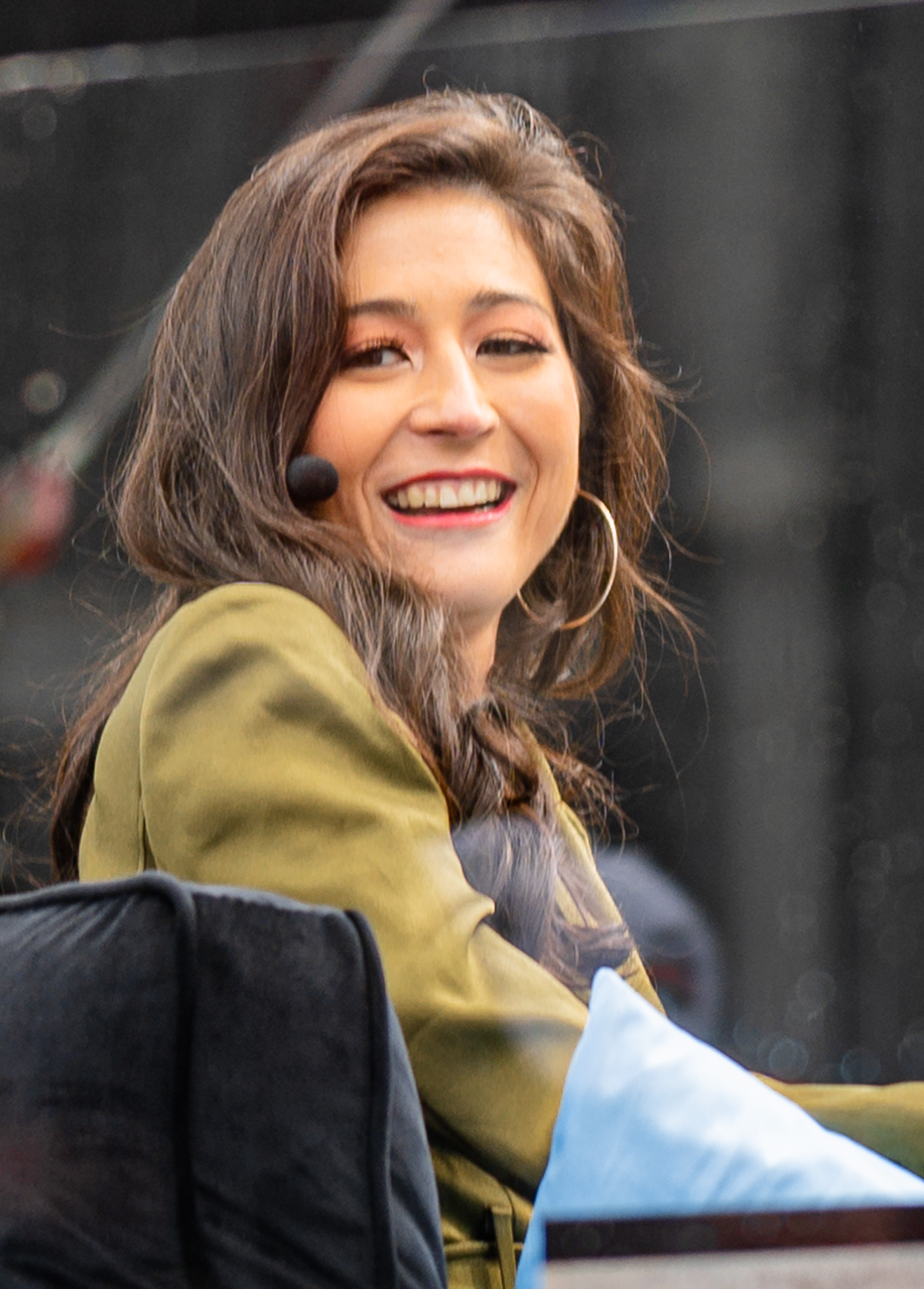
- Kimes on NFL Live in 2021
- Born: Mina Mugil Kimes; September 8, 1985 (age 41); Omaha, Nebraska, U.S.
- Education: Yale University (BA)
- Occupation: Journalist
- Years active: 2007–present
- Employer: ESPN
- Spouse: Nick Sylvester (m. 2015)
- Children: 1

Mina Mugil Kimes (born September 8, 1985) is an American journalist who specializes in business and sports reporting. She has written for Fortune, Bloomberg News, and ESPN. She is a senior writer at ESPN and an analyst on NFL Live.

== Early life ==
Kimes was born September 8, 1985, in Omaha, Nebraska. Her father served in the United States Air Force. Kimes is of Korean descent on her mother's side.

Kimes moved to Arizona with her family during her teenage years. She attended Mesquite High School in Gilbert, Arizona, and was valedictorian. She graduated summa cum laude from Yale University in 2007 with a Bachelor of Arts, majoring in English.

== Career ==
=== Business journalism ===
Kimes's first position after college was at Fortune Small Business Magazine in 2007. As a business journalist, she won awards from the New York Press Club, the National Press Club, and the Asian American Journalists Association, among others. Her 2012 investigation entitled Bad to the Bone exposed the unauthorized use of cement to repair bone tissue, with lethal consequences, for which she won the Henry R. Luce Award. The Columbia Journalism Review included her exposés among its business must-reads for 2012. In 2014, she received the Larry Birger Young Business Journalist Prize from the Society of American Business Editors and Writers.

She joined Bloomberg News in 2013 as an investigative reporter. Her profiles of business executives Doug Oberhelman of Caterpillar, in a piece titled King Kat, and Sears executive Eddie Lampert, in a piece titled The Sun Tzu at Sears, won her the Front Page Award for business reporting.

=== ESPN ===
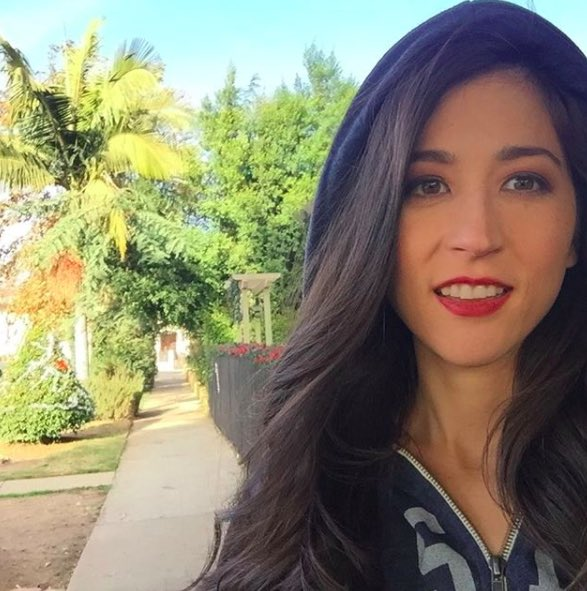
Kimes in 2020

Kimes was offered a position by ESPN editors in 2014 after she wrote an essay on Tumblr about a "bond between herself and her dad and the Seattle Seahawks." At ESPN, she has written about young sports superstars, such as University of Houston basketball player Devonta Pollard. She has written profiles of NFL players Aaron Rodgers, Darrelle Revis, Tyrod Taylor, Antonio Brown, Baker Mayfield, and Michael and Martellus Bennett, and wrote a feature on Korean League of Legends star Faker. She co-wrote with Jeff Passan a piece on sexual harassment claims against then-New York Mets GM Jared Porter, which resulted in his firing.

Kimes was an active panelist on Around the Horn and has appeared on First Take, Highly Questionable, The Dan Le Batard Show with Stugotz, Pardon the Interruption, Debatable, and High Noon. She hosts an NFL-focused podcast entitled The Mina Kimes Show featuring Lenny, a reference to her dog. She signed with Omaha Productions in 2022 to be producers of her podcast.

From October 2019 until July 2020, Kimes hosted ESPN Daily, a daily news podcast. On June 30, 2020, Kimes was announced as an NFL analyst for ESPN's relaunch of NFL Live for the 2020 NFL season.

In March 2025, Kimes called out the Trump administration during an appearance on Around the Horn for removing an article honoring Jackie Robinson's military service from the Department of Defense website as part of its anti-DEI agenda.

=== Other work ===
In 2019, Kimes was hired by the Los Angeles Rams to be a color commentator for their preseason football games.

Kimes was a co-host, along with Amanda Dobbins, of The Ringer's Big Little Live after-show about the HBO series Big Little Lies. She co-hosts Love is Kimes with Davis Dennis Jr, a show about the Netflix series Love is Blind.

On November 29, 2020, Kimes helped celebrity chef David Chang become the first celebrity to win the $1,000,000 top prize for his charity, Southern Smoke Foundation, and the fourteenth overall million dollar winner on Who Wants to Be a Millionaire, along with Alan Yang as his supporter, via the phone-a-friend lifeline on the million-dollar question.

In April 2025, Kimes competed in the third season of Celebrity Jeopardy!, losing in the semifinals to David Friedberg. She returned in 2026 for the show's fourth season, winning the tournament and $1 million for her chosen charity, the SELAH Neighborhood Homeless Coalition. In May 2026, Kimes joined the broadcast team for the Scripps National Spelling Bee on Ion Television. Michael Davies reached out to Kimes for the role due to her appearances on Celebrity Jeopardy!. Kimes had participated in school spelling bees as a child so hosting one was a "homecoming" for her.

== Personal life ==
Kimes married music executive Nick Sylvester in 2015. They live in Los Angeles with their dog Lenny. In 2023, Kimes had her first child, a boy.

She has expressed her support for the Seattle Seahawks and Seattle Mariners, in part due to her father being from Seattle. After the Seattle Seahawks won Super Bowl XLVIII in 2014, Kimes got "XLVIII" tattooed on her right biceps.

== Accolades ==
| Year | Association | Category | Nominated work | Result | Ref. |
|---|---|---|---|---|---|
| 2020 | Shorty Awards | Best Journalist | | Nominated | |
| 2024 | Sports Emmy Awards | Outstanding Personality/Studio Analyst | | Nominated | |
| 2025 | Sports Emmy Awards | Outstanding Studio Show - Daily | NFL Live | Won | |
| 2026 | Sports Emmy Awards | Outstanding Sports Personality: Studio Analyst | | Nominated | |
| 2026 | Sports Emmy Awards | Outstanding Studio Show - Daily | NFL Live | Won | |
