= History of MSNBC: 2008–2015 =

The following is a history of MSNBC from 2008–2015. MSNBC is an American basic cable and satellite news television channel that was founded in 1996. This era is known for its focus on more opinionated programming, which was drastically cut back in the recent shift towards hard news.

== 2008 election under Dan Abrams ==
=== Race for the White House ===
Tucker Carlson's program was canceled in March 2008 and replaced at the 6 pm slot with Race for the White House, hosted by David Gregory. The show was later renamed 1600 Pennsylvania Avenue in November after the election. When Gregory became the permanent host for Meet the Press, he stepped down as host of his MSNBC show, and David Shuster became the permanent host for the show.

=== Controversies ===
During the 2008 election, MSNBC was accused of bias in favor of Barack Obama and bias against primary challenger Hillary Clinton. During the conventions, Matthews and Olbermann had a bitter argument on the air. As a result, David Gregory took over as the only news anchor of debates and election night. Despite this, however, all of the aforementioned anchors were present on the 2008 general election coverage without incident, giving notion that the "dust-up" earlier in the year was taken completely out of proportion.

In the fall of 2008, MSNBC had a new channel slogan called "The Power of Change", which put emphasis on their support for Obama's "change" rhetoric.

== New leadership under president Phil Griffin ==
In July 2008, former CNN producer Phil Griffin was announced as President of MSNBC, replacing Dan Abrams. He worked with NBC for over 25 years, including working for MSNBC since its launch. The network's primetime ratings were up 54% in the first half of 2008, propelling MSNBC into the tightest race with its cable news competitors since 2001. In addition to his responsibilities at the 24-hour cable news channel, Griffin also oversees NBC News' specials coverage.

=== The Rachel Maddow Show ===
On September 8, 2008, The Rachel Maddow Show debuted in the 9 pm slot, effectively replacing Verdict with Dan Abrams. Rachel Maddow, who describes herself as a progressive, is openly lesbian, and is also a radio talk show host. In his first big move, Phil Griffin said

"Those people should just watch the show. We're hiring Rachel because she's a smart person. Rachel goes far beyond politics. She's an expert on military affairs. She was a Rhodes scholar."

Reviews for the show were mostly positive. Los Angeles Times journalist Matea Gold stated that Maddow, "finds the right formula on MSNBC", while Christopher Goodwin of The Guardian wrote Maddow has become the "star of America's cable news". The New York Times writer Alessandra Stanley opined, "Her program adds a good-humored female face to a cable news channel whose prime time is dominated by unruly, often squabbling schoolboys; Ms. Maddow's deep, modulated voice is reassuringly calm after so much shrill emotionalism and catfights among the channel's aging, white male divas".

The move to create a new program for the network was widely seen as a smart ratings move, where beforehand, the network lagged behind in coveted primetime ratings. The show began to regularly outperform CNN's Larry King Live, and made the network competitive in the program's time slot for the first time in over a decade.

=== Third primetime show ===
==== Speculation ====
On January 21, 2009, The New York Times reported that Phil Griffin would be prioritizing on increasing MSNBC's ratings in the 10 pm slot. In an interview done after the first presidential inauguration of Barack Obama, Griffin said that the channel needed a third original show in its lineup. "We can't let this momentum stop", he said. The new show would compete with Fox News Channel's On the Record with Greta Van Susteren and CNN's Anderson Cooper 360°. Keith Olbermann was reported to be working with Griffin to develop the show. He said:

"Losing the 10 p.m. replay is a very small price to pay for a last piece to the puzzle."

Three talk show hosts were campaigning for the job. They included Cenk Uygur, Sam Seder and David Sirota, all of whom are self-declared or considered by critics as liberal or progressive. Cenk Uygur, host of The Young Turks, was lobbying for the 10 pm slot. On January 22, Uygur announced his candidacy for the bid. He encouraged his viewers to send MSNBC emails or simply mail them. The show received endorsements from Senate Majority Leader Harry Reid and former General Wesley Clark. A Facebook group lobbied for MSNBC to choose Air America Radio liberal talk show host Sam Seder on the 10 pm slot; Seder, also a comedian and actor, was the co-host for The Majority Report and his own show The Sam Seder Show, and also co-hosted the weekday Air America Media webcast Breakroom Live with Maron & Seder with comedian Marc Maron. David Sirota is a progressive commentator who has made guest appearances on many television shows. On February 25, 2009, Sirota announced his candidacy and also created a Facebook page. He stated four reasons: he is great on TV, he is a leading anti-corporate, influence over the media, and increasing a chance the slot will be landed by a progressive.

On March 31, 2009, Griffin announced that at that time the 10 pm slot would not be filled because ratings of the Countdown rerun were higher. However, Cenk Uygur decided to continue the campaign anyway and decided to start "Stage 2". On June 1, 2009, Griffin went back on what he said a few months earlier by saying:

"Clearly it should be someone who is both smart and funny like she is. ... But I will make one promise: we're not done yet! This is such a vibrant time in media, and I want to say to Rachel's audience – and everywhere I go I get stopped, there's such a connection between her and her audience, she's helped open a new world of approaches for us – that people who like Rachel will like our new 10 o'clock show host and what we are going to do there. No, I take that back, Rachel's audience will love it! I promise."

==== The Last Word with Lawrence O'Donnell ====
MSNBC eventually launched a 10 pm show to replace the Countdown rebroadcast and to pad out its primetime lineup with entirely first-run talk programs. Lawrence O'Donnell began hosting a 10 pm ET show on the channel called The Last Word with Lawrence O'Donnell, which premiered on September 27, 2010.

=== The Ed Show ===
On March 10, 18, and 23, 2009, Air America radio host Ed Schultz served as a substitute host for David Shuster on 1600 Pennsylvania Avenue. On March 20, 2009, The New York Observer reported that Griffin was in discussions with Schultz to join MSNBC as a host. Around this time, Schultz's radio program The Ed Schultz Show was the most listened to progressive radio show with 3 million listeners each week.

On April 1, 2009, the network announced that Schultz had been given the 6:00 pm ET slot, replacing 1600 Pennsylvania Avenue, with Shuster being reassigned by the network as substitute host for Olbermann on Countdown. Schultz's new talk program The Ed Show premiered as a weeknightly program on MSNBC on April 6, 2009.

=== The Dylan Ratigan Show ===
Morning Meeting with Dylan Ratigan was a news show hosted by former host of sister CNBC's Fast Money, Dylan Ratigan. It debuted on June 29, 2009, as part of sweeping changes to MSNBC's weekday daytime program schedule, along with a revamp of the channel's graphics and the launch of its high definition simulcast feed. It aired weekdays from 9 to 11 am ET.

When the show relaunched as The Dylan Ratigan Show on January 11, 2010, the show featured a new graphics package and set design. The change was made in order to make room for The Daily Rundown with Chuck Todd and Savannah Guthrie at 9 am, as part of MSNBC's commitment to straight news programming during the day. The show focused on debate and discussion relating to politics and the economy. Ratigan often offered commentary on the subject matter and rebuttal to many of the guests who appear on the show.

== MSNBC HD ==
On April 2, 2009, it was announced that MSNBC would launch a 1080i high-definition simulcast feed, MSNBC HD, on June 29, 2009.

== Ratings under Griffin ==
In March 2009, MSNBC finished in second place in primetime, ahead of CNN for the first time in its existence. Phil Griffin, MSNBC chief executive, attributed this to the network's decision to go liberal with Olbermann and Maddow along with problems at CNN.

In the first quarter of 2010, the network beat CNN in primetime and overall ratings, marking the first time it did so since 2001. The network also beat CNN in total adult viewers in March, marking the seventh out of the past eight months that MSNBC achieved that accolade. In addition, the programs Morning Joe, The Ed Show, Hardball with Chris Matthews, Countdown with Keith Olbermann and The Rachel Maddow Show all finished ahead of their time slot competitors on CNN.

During 2014, MSNBC's total ratings in the 25 to 54 age group declined 20%, falling to third place behind CNN. The only demographic in which MSNBC still leads is among Hispanics and even more so among African-Americans.

== Keith Olbermann's suspension and departure ==
In November 2010, MSNBC announced that Keith Olbermann, the host of the highly rated news/opinion show Countdown, was suspended for violating an NBC News policy barring personalities from donating to political candidates; MSNBC had discovered that Olbermann had donated to three Democratic Party candidates in the run-up to the 2010 mid-term congressional elections.

On the January 21, 2011, episode of Countdown, Olbermann abruptly announced that the show would be his final MSNBC broadcast. Before reading a James Thurber short story called "The Scottie Who Knew Too Much", Olbermann thanked viewers, producers, and technical staff for his show's eight-year success. However, he did not thank or even mention Griffin or NBC News president Steve Capus. Olbermann did not disclose the reason for his departure, and a statement from MSNBC would only reveal that the two parties had ended the commentator's four-year contract. Many liberal bloggers and commentators blamed cable provider Comcast for Olbermann's sudden departure, accusing the company of silencing the host for political purposes just days after acquiring NBCUniversal on January 18. Statements from MSNBC and Comcast denied this allegation. Daily Beast media critic Howard Kurtz, former MSNBC anchor David Shuster, and an anonymous NBC executive said that Olbermann's past suspension and subsequent conflicts with network management was a more likely precipitating factor in Countdown's cancellation.

The following month, Olbermann announced he had joined a soon-to-be-relaunched Current TV as its new primetime host and news director. He also started a blog called FOKNewsChannel.com, a commentary site parodying Fox News, which included written commentaries and articles based on former Countdown segments.

== Ratings 2015–present ==
In 2015, Mediaite reported that the ratings of CNN's morning show New Day almost doubled those of MSNBC's Morning Joe. However, Chris Hayes of All In with Chris Hayes said that the "primetime lineup is solid."
