= History of MSNBC: 1996–2007 =

The following is a history of MSNBC from 1996 to 2007. MSNBC is an American basic cable and satellite news television channel that was created in 1996 by Microsoft and General Electric's NBC unit, which is now the Comcast-owned NBCUniversal.

Microsoft invested $220 million for a 50% share of the cable network, while MSNBC and Microsoft would share the cost of a $200 million newsroom in Redmond, Washington for MSNBC. NBC supplied the channel space that was occupied by the 18-month-old America's Talking network. Its name is a combination of "MSN" and "NBC". MSNBC (similarly to Fox News) was created as an alternative to CNN.

The following are highlights from the network's first 11 years; its history from 2008 to 2015 is separately covered. Mark Harrington was the first president of MSNBC until his death in 1998; the network's first permanent studios in Secaucus, New Jersey, were later named for Harrington.

== Launch ==
MSNBC was launched on July 15, 1996, after a lengthy taped loop of promos aired following the end of America's Talking. The first show, which was anchored by Jodi Applegate, broadcast a lineup of news read by Lori Stokes, interviews and opinions. The first three news stories MSNBC covered on its launch are Boris Yeltsin meeting then-vice president Al Gore despite concerns over Yeltsin's health, an update on Bob Dole's presidential campaign, and updated information about the Khobar Towers bombing. During the day, rolling news coverage continued with The Contributors, a show that featured Ann Coulter and Laura Ingraham, as well as interactive programming coordinated by Applegate, John Gibson and John Seigenthaler. Stories were generally longer and more detailed than the stories running on CNN at the time.

== Connecting news and the Internet (1996–1998) ==
The start was a bit bumpy due to a series of changes in management and continuing internal squabbles over the direction of the network. Some NBC affiliates were concerned that cross-promotion would divert viewers from their own programs, although that fear abated. However, MSNBC was often first to break news, ushering in an era of hypercompetitiveness between the news channels that continues today. MSNBC originally demonstrated the interactive value of the Internet. The network's first slogan was It's Time to Get Connected, and e-mail addresses and phone numbers were displayed regularly. It was headquartered from studios in Fort Lee, New Jersey. In November 1996, the network moved to new studios in Secaucus, New Jersey.

The network's goal of attracting a younger, tech-savvy audience in 1996 failed to materialize. In September 1997, MSNBC laid off 20% of its staff and canceled one of its earliest programs, The Site, due to low ratings and the press of a news story (the death of Princess Diana), which angered many viewers. The network began moving away from its Internet roots, and began covering fashion and entertainment features like its competitors. After its first year, the network had 24,000 households viewing it per night, well short of the 578,000 of CNN and the 30,000 of Fox News (which was four months younger than MSNBC)

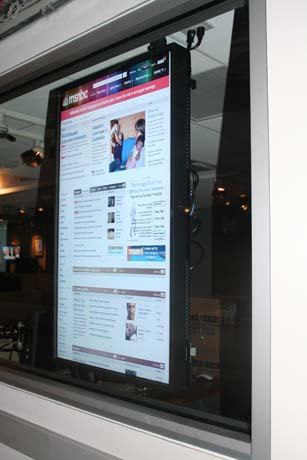
Monitor on the wall of the MSNBC studios showing msnbc.com.

That show was replaced by Headliners and Legends, a biography program that became a weekend staple on the network ever since. Also in 1999, the management of MSNBC replaced midday news coverage with a delayed broadcast of NBC's Today called Today on MSNBC and repackaged Dateline NBC stories into MSNBC Investigates, a decision that angered NBC affiliates.

A fictionalized version of MSNBC and its newsroom was featured in the 1998 science fiction film Deep Impact, after CNN reportedly declined.

=== Early programs ===
==== Imus in the Morning ====
MSNBC signed a simulcast agreement with Infinity Broadcasting station WFAN in New York City to carry the Imus in the Morning radio show, which began on September 2, 1996.

==== Internight ====
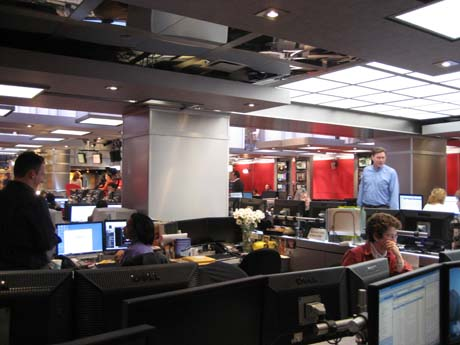
The current MSNBC newsroom in Manhattan.

Primetime featured an hour-long interview program called Internight (which showcased the stars of NBC News), followed by the network's flagship newscast. It was a rotating host lineup of big names such as Tom Brokaw, Katie Couric, Bob Costas, Bryant Gumbel and Bill Moyers. The first Internight included an interview with President Bill Clinton, who took questions from callers and e-mailers. BET host Ed Gordon also contributed to the new network by hosting the Saturday version of Internight.

==== Brian Williams and Soledad O'Brien ====
The original two primetime shows were The News with Brian Williams, hosted by Brian Williams, and The Site, a show about the Internet and computers co-hosted by Soledad O'Brien and a "live" computer-generated character called Dev Null played by Leo Laporte. Other shows that made use of the Internet included News Chat featuring Mary Kathleen Flynn, and a look into the past with Time & Again, anchored by Jane Pauley. The Site was canceled in 1997 and was eventually followed by The News being dropped and relocated to CNBC in 2002.

The crash of TWA Flight 800 was broken on The News by Williams several minutes before CNN; Howard Rosenberg of the Los Angeles Times felt that its coverage was initially marred by disorganized coordination with NBC News personnel (as many of its chief correspondents were in Atlanta for coverage of the 1996 Summer Olympics) and technical issues, but improved throughout the evening and benefited from WNBC's helicopter imagery. However, he still felt that CNN's Linden Soles-led coverage was of better quality.

==== Keith Olbermann and John Hockenberry ====
SportsCenter host Keith Olbermann left ESPN to join MSNBC in 1997. In the 8 pm timeslot, Internight was replaced with The Big Show with Keith Olbermann in hopes that his irreverent style would spike up ratings. But when the Monica Lewinsky scandal broke in 1998, The Big Show morphed into White House in Crisis. Olbermann became frustrated as his show was consumed by the Lewinsky story. In 1998, he stated that his work at MSNBC would "make me ashamed, make me depressed, make me cry." He left MSNBC and joined Fox Sports Net. Olbermann was then replaced by Dateline NBC host John Hockenberry, whose show Edgewise became popular.

==== Chris Matthews and Mitch Albom ====
Political advisor under President Jimmy Carter, Chris Matthews began his own show Hardball with Chris Matthews on both CNBC and replaced Hockenberry's 8 pm show Edgewise. Prior to this, Matthews hosted Politics with Chris Matthews on MSNBC predecessor America's Talking. Hardball would last up to March 2020.

Popular author and sports and political journalist Mitch Albom hosted his own two-hour program The Mitch Albom Show. Despite high ratings, the show was canceled after a few months. The reason is rumored to be that he did not get along with the leadership at MSNBC.

== Leadership under President Erik Sorenson (1998–2004) ==
In 1999, MSNBC began a partnership with The Washington Post that permitted more integrated coverage on the website. The msnbc.com website, a separate company, remained relatively successful, becoming the most-used online news site in 1997, 1998, and 1999. MSNBC's ratings significantly increased during the impeachment of Bill Clinton, following a new "covering the Big Story" format that provided saturation coverage for the top stories. Keith Olbermann left over MSNBC's continuing focus on the impeachment.

On April 3, 2000, Home Page, a show hosted by three women – Ashleigh Banfield, Gina Gaston and Mika Brzezinski – debuted. Along with Home Page, MSNBC tried to attract female viewers by signing a deal in February 2001 with Detroit radio station WJR to simulcast the first two hours of The Mitch Albom Show. While the pairing was a ratings winner, both shows would eventually be canceled: Home Page due to sinking ratings; and The Mitch Albom Show due to its frequent preemptions and some disagreements with the MSNBC management. In 2000, John Gibson, one of the original MSNBC hosts, left the network. His confrontational tenure as the host of the Feedback primetime program foreshadowed his opinion program on the Fox News Channel. MSNBC continued to repackage NBC News programs (Special Edition and Crime Files), and during the 2000 presidential election cycle, reporters and interviews were cycled constantly between broadcast NBC and the cable news channel. MSNBC also commissioned original documentaries similar to the Discovery Channel for use as filler on weekends. Later in the year, Lester Holt received kudos for his daily coverage of the Florida election controversy.

By the start of 2001, MSNBC continued to trail both Fox News and CNN. With the success of Fox News Channel, MSNBC tried to emulate the Fox News Channel's emphasis on opinion hosts. The Project for Excellence in Journalism found in 2007 after a seven-year survey of cable networks that "MSNBC is moving to make politics a brand, with a large dose of opinion and personality." In January 2001, Mike Barnicle got a show on MSNBC, but it was canceled in June 2001 due to high production costs. In June, in a sign of continuing trouble of MSNBC, Microsoft CEO Steve Ballmer said that he would not have started MSNBC if he knew then what he knows now (referencing the longstanding troubles in increasing viewership).

After the September 11 attacks in 2001, MSNBC served as an outlet for NBC News to provide up-to-the-minute coverage, in contrast to broadcast network NBC's longer stories. CNBC and CNBC Europe, with little financial news to report, ran MSNBC for many hours of the day following the attacks. The year also boosted the profile of Ashleigh Banfield, who had escaped injury while covering the World Trade Center on September 11. Her Region In Conflict program capitalized on her newfound celebrity and showcased exclusive interviews from Afghanistan.

In 2001 and 2002, MSNBC tried to focus on opinion journalism. MSNBC still had low ratings, but scored up to triple the usual ratings during the 2002 Winter Olympics, airing several events, but this success was not due to news programming. MSNBC rebranded itself as America's NewsChannel, with a patriotic theme proclaiming MSNBC to be fiercely independent. The News with Brian Williams was moved to CNBC, leaving MSNBC with primarily opinion shows in the evening. The experiment failed miserably and many shows were canceled. The network was regularly beaten in the ratings by CNN Headline News. Overall, ratings dropped 36% from the previous year.

=== Programs debuted under Sorenson's leadership ===
==== The Abrams Report ====
The Abrams Report was a talk show focusing on crime news, which debuted in December 2001; the program aired in the 4 and 6 pm ET timeslots. It was canceled in 2006.

==== Alan Keyes Is Making Sense ====
Alan Keyes Is Making Sense was an opinionated news show led by conservative Alan Keyes. MSNBC canceled the program after a few months, citing low ratings; however, the move resulted in a network boycott by many Jewish Americans who claimed Keyes was fired for his pro-Israel political views.

==== Buchanan & Press ====
The debate show Buchanan & Press debuted in 2002, and featured conservative Pat Buchanan and liberal Bill Press. It became very intense, but when the Iraq War started in March 2003, both were decidedly against the war, which led to the program's cancellation in 2003.

==== Donahue ====
In 2002, liberal and anti-war activist Phil Donahue came back to MSNBC and hosted his own show, Donahue. Donahue's ratings plummeted, from 660,000 households in his first week to just 136,000 households in his sixth week, a drop of 80%. MSNBC publicly proclaimed support for Donahue and moved some shows to try to stabilize his ratings, helping to increase his viewership to 446,000 households. Donahue himself claimed that MSNBC was trying to "out-fox" Fox by removing him and adding Joe Scarborough to the lineup. Donahue's time slot was replaced by Countdown with Keith Olbermann.

==== The Savage Nation ====
Conservative Michael Savage was hired by MSNBC president Erik Sorenson to host a one-hour show, The Savage Nation, which debuted on March 8, 2003; Savage's hiring occurred despite his previous criticism of the network in his book, also titled The Savage Nation, and the objections of NBC employees like anchor Tom Brokaw, who asked NBC executives, "Is this the sort of man who embodies the values of NBC?" Sorenson, at the time, called Savage "brash, passionate and smart," and promised that he would provide "compelling opinion and analysis with an edge."

From the very beginning of his stint at MSNBC, the Gay & Lesbian Alliance Against Defamation (GLAAD) urged the show's sponsors to stop advertising on the show. Savage did not sue GLAAD, but Talk Radio Network Inc. (TRN), which syndicated his radio show, did sue the owners of three small non-commercial websites that had criticized Savage and endorsed the call for advertisers to withdraw their support for the show: savagestupidity.com, michaelsavagesucks.com, and takebackthemedia.com. The suit alleged that the defendants had caused Savage financial damage by interfering with his relationship with advertisers, had used material from The Michael Savage Show without permission, and had spread "false and malicious" information about Savage.

Savage was eventually fired only a few months later, in the wake of telling a caller to his show, "You should only get AIDS and die, you pig".

==== Scarborough Country ====
MSNBC hired former Republican congressman Joe Scarborough in 2003, and he became the host of the discussion program Scarborough Country. The show averaged 300,000 viewers a night at the 9 pm slot, becoming one of the few successful shows, and lasted for four years until its cancellation in 2007.

==== MSNBC Live ====
On August 4, 2002, MSNBC debuted MSNBC Live, NBC News' flagship daytime news platform, with John Elliott and Christy Musumeci anchoring from 8am to noon, and Natalie Morales from 3pm to 6pm ET. On weekdays it aired from 9am to noon with various anchors. The show's runtime and hosts, later, often vary depending on the year. It is also known to run long when breaking news warrants, sometimes into the night. MSNBC Live currently maintains a generic format, focusing on breaking news events notwithstanding, live political news and developments, as well as The Weather Channel forecasts and, in the afternoon, a CNBC Market Wrap.

==== Jesse Ventura's America ====
After retiring as Governor of Minnesota, Jesse Ventura got his own show on MSNBC that aired on Saturdays. Jesse Ventura's America was canceled after a few months.

==== Countdown with Keith Olbermann ====
The show's logo, used from 2003 to October 19, 2007.

Countdown, originally titled Countdown: Iraq when it premiered on October 7, 2002, was hosted by Lester Holt. The program focused completely on the military and diplomatic actions which would become the Iraq War. Countdown: Iraq aired at 7 pm and replaced a show hosted by Jerry Nachman, which was moved up to 5 pm before its eventual cancellation. In addition, a daytime version of Countdown entitled Countdown: 2002 Election aired from October 25, 2002, to November 2002. On March 28, 2003, MSNBC announced it was (re-)hiring Keith Olbermann to host the 8 pm hour of Countdown. The show dropped the Iraq subtitle and was retitled Countdown with Keith Olbermann. The 7 pm hour of Countdown was replaced by Hardball with Chris Matthews. Holt was reassigned to anchor rolling news coverage during the day.

The show was known for Olbermann's fast-paced rhetorical style, historical and pop culture references, ready interjections, and strong and often scathingly stated opinions. Olbermann melded news stories, both serious and light, with commentary, much of it critical of the Bush administration. The show has been the source of some controversy due to these criticisms, as well as its host's ongoing criticism of MSNBC rival Fox News Channel – which he refers to as "Fixed News", "Fox Noise", "Faux News" and "Fixed Noise" – and his feud with rival commentator Bill O'Reilly of Fox News's The O'Reilly Factor, whose show ran directly opposite Countdown. The show's absence of guests who challenge Olbermann's views was noted by Howard Rosenberg in a commentary published in the Los Angeles Times. "At least O'Reilly invites dissenters to his lair (if only to disembowel them)," wrote Rosenberg, "Whereas Countdown is more or less an echo chamber in which Olbermann and like-minded bobbleheads nod at each other."

The show became the highest-rated and most successful program on MSNBC. In the first quarter of 2008, the show averaged 907,000 viewers a day, compared with about 550,000 viewers for Hardball with Chris Matthews which aired before it. This was an increase of about 230,000 daily viewers from the third quarter of 2007. Countdown has been referred to as the "flagship" MSNBC franchise, so much so that on February 15, 2007, Olbermann received a four-year contract extension, which included two Countdown primetime specials on NBC.

== Leadership under President Rick Kaplan (2004–2006) ==
Former CNN chief Rick Kaplan was hired to run MSNBC, replacing Erik Sorenson as president at the helm of the last-place cable news network. An award-winning producer at ABC News, Kaplan headed CNN's domestic operations from 1997 to 2000. After teaching at Harvard, Kaplan returned to ABC News in 2003 to help plan Iraq war coverage. Under Sorenson, MSNBC averaged 373,000 viewers in prime time, compared with CNN's 927,000 and Fox News's 1.62 million. Rick Kaplan is identified by critics as a liberal because of his friendship with Bill Clinton.

On December 23, 2005, it was announced that Microsoft would sell its remaining 32% share of the MSNBC network to NBC Universal, solidifying its control over television operations and allowing NBC to further consolidate MSNBC's backroom operations with NBC News and its other cable properties. msnbc.com would continue to be 50% owned by both NBC and Microsoft, and its operations would be largely unaffected. The purchase gave NBC the option to buy the remaining 18% share from Microsoft after two years. Rumors circulated that the cable network would eventually be rebranded as NBC News Channel, a name currently used for the network's news service to NBC affiliates.

=== Programs debuted under Kaplan's leadership ===
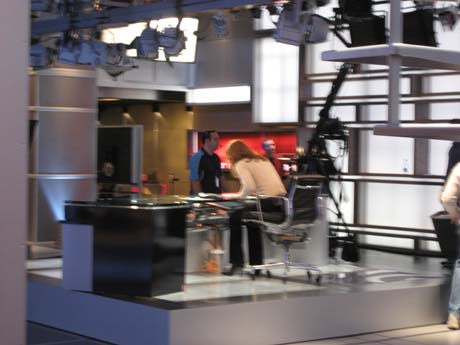
MSNBC's current studio in NYC.

==== Connected: Coast to Coast ====
Connected: Coast to Coast was a debate program that was co-hosted by conservative Monica Crowley and liberal Ron Reagan Jr. The program aired in the 5 pm timeslot. It was canceled a few months later in 2005.

==== Rita Cosby: Live & Direct ====
Rita Cosby hosted her own news/talk show called Rita Cosby: Live & Direct in the 10 pm slot against Fox News Channel's On the Record with Greta Van Susteren. Live & Direct was canceled a year later in 2006.

==== The Situation with Tucker Carlson ====
Kaplan hired libertarian/conservative Tucker Carlson from CNN to host his own show at 6 pm ET, the political talk show The Situation with Tucker Carlson, which debuted in 2005. The program, which was later renamed simply Tucker, lasted for three years until it was replaced in 2008 by Race to the White House and 1600 Pennsylvania Avenue.

== Leadership under GM Dan Abrams (2006–2008) ==
A week following the column, Rick Kaplan resigned as president of MSNBC, after holding the post for two years. He said that

We've increased MSNBC's viewership 25% in prime time and 19% in dayside. It is not often in professional life that someone has the opportunity to end his tenure on such a high note.

Following the announcement, it was announced on June 12, 2006, that Dan Abrams, a nine-year veteran of MSNBC and NBC News, had been named general manager of MSNBC, effective immediately. NBC News Senior Vice President Phil Griffin would oversee MSNBC. Griffin would also continue to oversee NBC News' Today, and Abrams would report to Griffin.

On June 29, 2006, Abrams announced a revamp to MSNBC's early evening and primetime schedule. On July 10, Tucker (formerly The Situation with Tucker Carlson) started airing at 4 and 6 pm ET (taking over Abrams' old timeslot), while Rita Cosby's Live & Direct was taken off the schedule. Cosby was instead given the role of primary anchor for MSNBC Investigates at 10 and 11 pm ET, a new program that took over Cosby and Carlson's timeslots. According to the press release, MSNBC Investigates promised to "... complement MSNBC's existing programming by building on [the network's] library of award winning documentaries." The move to taped programming during 10 and 11 pm was likely a result of the success that the network saw with their Friday "experiment" of replacing all primetime programming with taped specials. On April 11, 2007, the television simulcast of Don Imus' radio program Imus in the Morning was canceled after Imus made controversial remarks about the Rutgers Scarlet Knights women's basketball team, referring to some members of the team as "nappy headed hoes". (from October 5, 2009, until his retirement from television on May 29, 2015 Imus aired on the Fox Business Network, previously airing on RFD-TV after being canceled by MSNBC).

On October 22, 2007, MSNBC moved to its new headquarters in New York City at the newly renovated 3rd and 4th floors of 30 Rockefeller Center. Studio 3A debuted that morning when MSNBC's Morning Joe opened its broadcast from the studio at 6 am ET.

=== Programs debuted under Abrams' leadership ===
==== Verdict with Dan Abrams ====
While serving as general manager of the network, Abrams appointed himself to host his own show following Matthews and Olbermann in the 9 pm timeslot, Verdict with Dan Abrams. The show was a revamped version of Abrams' previous show on MSNBC in 2001, The Abrams Report.

==== Doc Block ====
Abrams decided in June 2006 to cancel Rita Cosby's show at the 10 pm slot and replace it with documentary programming.

==== Race for the White House ====
Tucker Carlson's program was canceled in March 2008 and replaced at the 6 pm slot with Race for the White House, hosted by David Gregory. The show was later renamed 1600 Pennsylvania Avenue in November after the election.
