= The Abrams Report =

- Presented by: Dan Abrams
- Country of origin: United States
- Original language: English

Original release
- Network: MSNBC
- Release: December 2001 – July 7, 2006

The Abrams Report is an American television program on MSNBC, focusing on legal and tabloid issues.

Until June 2006, the show was hosted by Dan Abrams. Following his appointment to General Manager of MSNBC, the show was anchored by guest hosts including Susan Filan and Lisa Daniels. In his farewell address on the show, Abrams said that the show would soon be replaced. Susan Filan served as a guest host on July 7, 2006. On July 10, 2006, Tucker with Tucker Carlson premiered in the 4pm ET and 6pm ET time-slots previously held by The Abrams Report. In 2007 Abrams returned to on-air work by hosting Live with Dan Abrams.
