= Bill Wolff (television executive) =

American television producer (born 1966)

- Born: March 4, 1966 (age 59)
- Occupation: Television producer

Billy Johnny Wolff (born March 4, 1966) is an American television producer. He was most recently the executive producer of The View. He has served as the vice president of prime-time programming for the cable news channel MSNBC, as well as the executive producer of The Rachel Maddow Show.

== Biography ==
Wolff was born to a Jewish family and is a graduate of Clayton High School in Clayton, Missouri and Harvard College, where he was a history major and member of the varsity water polo team.

At MSNBC, he was previously the executive producer of The Situation with Tucker Carlson, later called Tucker, before his promotion in 2005. Wolff was also seen on Tucker filling in for Willie Geist and reporting on entertainment news. He left MSNBC in August 2014 to become a part of The View.

Before joining MSNBC, Wolff produced ESPN's Around the Horn (where he was also the "disembodied voice") and Fox Sports Net's I, Max, two sports commentary shows hosted by Max Kellerman, and served as a "judge" for the latter program. At ESPN, he helped produce SportsCenter and Sunday NFL Countdown.

== Personal life ==
Wolff is divorced from Alison Stewart, currently the host of WNYC's afternoon show, All of It. Although of Jewish descent, Wolff is non-believing.
