= Red Sox Rule =

2008 book by Michael Holley

- Author: Michael Holley
- Language: English
- Genre: Non-fiction
- Publisher: HarperCollins Publishers
- Publication date: 2008
- Publication place: United States
- Media type: Print (Hardcover)
- Pages: 202
- ISBN: 978-0-06-145854-5
- Dewey Decimal: 796.357'640974461 22
- LC Class: GV875.B62 H65 2008

Red Sox Rule: Terry Francona and Boston's Rise to Dominance is a book written by Michael Holley that documents the 2007 Boston Red Sox season, a year in which they won the American League pennant and went on to win the World Series.

== Book Summary ==
Although Red Sox Rule is a book that appears to be about the team, it is actually more focused on the team's manager, Terry Francona, rather than the team itself. HarperCollins, the book's publisher describes the book as an "... inside look at how it all happened ... [and] reveals the private sessions and the dugout and front-office strategies that have made the Boston Red Sox a budding dynasty." Francona's selection as the team's manager followed the firing of his predecessor, Grady Little whose decisions during the 2003 American League championship series were widely criticized by the media, the public, and the teams ownership. In his first year as the manager, Francona took the Red Sox to the World Series where the team defeated the St. Louis Cardinals and won its first championship title in 86 years. Subsequently, the team was generally successfully during the 2005 and 2006 seasons, but it was not until the 2007 season that the team attained the same level of success as it did in 2004, and once again won the World Series.

The book discusses Francona's childhood and his relationship with his father, Tito Francona, who was also a major league baseball player. Several chapters are then devoted to Francona's early baseball years from high school in New Brighton, Pennsylvania to the University of Arizona, to his 10-year career as a major league player. Following his professional playing career, Francona went on to manage in the minor leagues where he gained national attention as the manager of the Birmingham Barons whose roster included NBA Hall of Fame player Michael Jordan. Francona's efforts in managing Jordan as well as managing the unprecedented level of media coverage won him admirers in both the baseball community and the press.

The book also discusses his battle with health in chapter 10: Life And Death

== Reception ==
The book was well received by the public and appeared on both the New York Times Best Seller list as well as regional lists. Critics generally provided positive reviews, highlighting the inside information that Holley was able to obtain from spending countless hours with Francona during the season, but also criticising the scarce amount of material in the book regarding the 2004 season

What's there is very good -- there are plenty of interesting details that aren't public knowledge placed here# But the story jumps around a little bit and feels incomplete. For example, there is surprisingly little information on the 2004 season, which of course changed the lives of every Red Sox fan alive. And it's not as if there wasn't room for more material, "Red Sox Rule" checks in at 202 pages of text, and it's easy to breeze through this in a couple of days.

This is a good read for Red Sox fans looking to learn a bit more about Francona, both on and off the field. Like many, he's taken an interesting route to get where he is, and like most, it hasn't been a straight or easy path to the manager's chair.

At least one Boston-based critic stated that Holley's relationship with Francona was much too close and personal for the author to provide an unbiased look. The same reviewer also questioned the author's ability to gain access to Michael Jordan although he did not go as far as to claim that Holley falsified information.
