= Vanderbilt University registered student organization non-discrimination policy =

Vanderbilt University requires registered student organizations (Note: Single-sex organizations are allowed to condition membership on the basis of gender.) to allow all students to enroll as members and to allow all members to seek leadership positions. The adoption of this provision, commonly called a "non-discrimination policy," has sparked controversy among religious groups. Though federal law provides a non-discrimination exemption for fraternities and sororities, religious organizations are not granted the same exemption.

== Background ==
In 2010, the Supreme Court passed a ruling declaring that educational institutions can refuse to recognize religious student organizations that do not admit all members into the organization. In November 2010, the Vanderbilt Hustler reported allegations that two members of Vanderbilt's Beta Upsilon Chi fraternity were asked to leave based on their homosexual orientation, an orientation prohibited by the Beta Upsilon Chi Code of Conduct. Following this controversy, the university opted to uphold the non-discrimination policy in favor of the homosexual students which sparked a divide among the university's Catholic and Christian student groups. Ultimately, of the 30 Christian groups previously on campus, 17 opted to remain on campus and abide by the policy, while 13 moved off campus.
