= Alan Nathan =

American talk show host

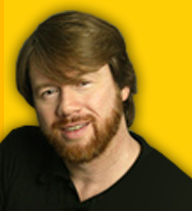
- Born: United States
- Occupations: Journalist, radio talk show host

Alan Nathan is a centrist US radio talk show host and columnist. He starts his shows with the mantra: "We want the Republicans out of our bedrooms, the Democrats out of our wallets, and both out of our First and Second Amendment rights!" and describes himself as "The Militant Moderate". He has sometimes been labeled as libertarian.

Nathan began his career in radio as a DJ at 1480 WPWC Radio in Dumfries, Virginia, and it was there where he aired his first talk show, Profile and Comment with Alan Nathan. Soon afterward, he adapted this program to public-access television and caught the attention of legendary columnist and then anchor personality Jack Anderson. Based on Anderson's experience as a guest on Profile and Comment, Nathan was hired as a correspondent on the Financial News Network's Insiders With Jack Anderson.

In 1998, Nathan started Spanking the Left and Right, a local show on WZHF 1390 AM in the Washington, D.C. market. He was soon picked up by the Radio America Network and became the syndicated weekend host of Battling the Left and Right. In 2000, that show also became a daily program and was renamed Battle Line with Alan Nathan.

Wanting to commit more time to his columns, Nathan decided that effective September 4, 2006, he would cease Battle Line's daily syndication but would continue its long-running syndicated weekend edition.

In 2010, however, he joined forces with Main Street Radio Network as vice president (overseeing programming and syndication) and seamlessly continued Battle Line's weekend show. Later in 2010, he added the resumption of Battle Line's daily edition. In November 2012, Main Street Radio's distribution was moved to the Salem Radio Network where it continues today.

In August 2013, Nathan yielded to popular request and changed the name of his program from Battle Line with Alan Nathan to The Alan Nathan Show. As quoted in All Access, "They've been calling it the Alan Nathan Show for years, so I learned how to take a hint. Additionally, while there’s plenty of spirited debate (or battling) happening on the program, it's also a guest-generated, panel-driven event that teases all who take themselves too seriously."

Talkers Magazine rated Nathan as one of the Top 100 Talk Hosts in America for 2002, 2003 and 2005.

== Columnist ==
Nathan is also a contributor to several magazines and websites, including The Washington Times, FrontPage Magazine, Insight on the News, WorldNetDaily, and the Washington Examiner.
