= Willie Geist =

American television personality (born 1975)

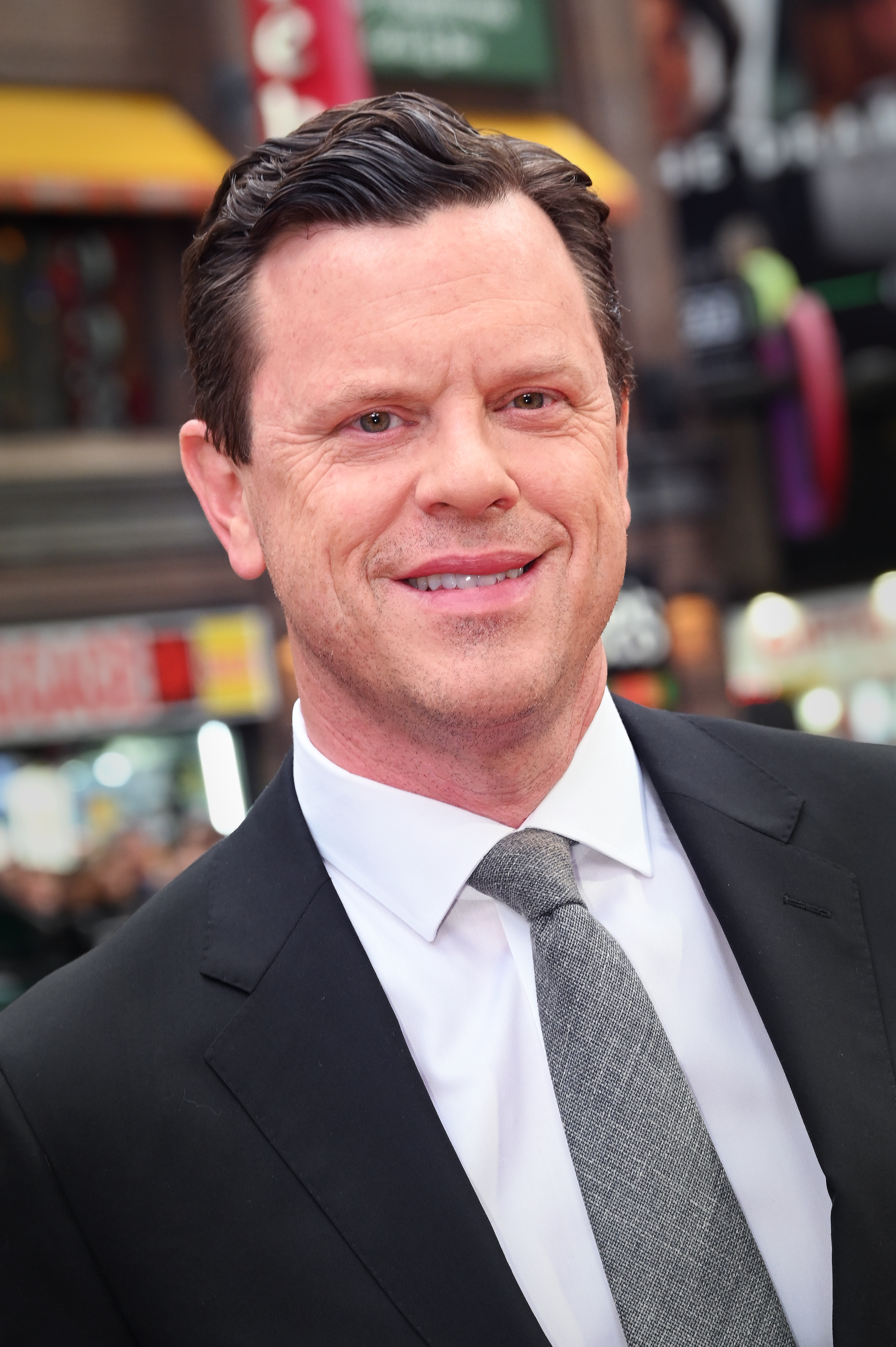
- Geist in 2025
- Born: William Russell Geist; May 3, 1975 (age 51); Evanston, Illinois, U.S.
- Education: Vanderbilt University
- Occupations: Television personality; journalist
- Years active: 1997–present
- Spouse: Christina Sharkey (m. 2003)
- Children: 2
- Parent: Bill Geist (father)
- Relatives: Herbie Lewis (great-grandfather); Libby Geist Wildes

William Russell Geist (born May 3, 1975) is an American television personality and journalist. He is co-anchor of MS NOW's Morning Joe and anchor of NBC News's Sunday Today with Willie Geist. Geist also frequently serves as a fill-in anchor on both the 7-9 a.m. and 10 a.m. hours of Today. Geist is a correspondent for NBC News and NBC Sports, hosting and contributing to NBC's Olympic coverage. Geist has hosted the Macy's 4th of July Fireworks and Rockefeller Center Christmas Tree Lighting on NBC.

Geist is the author or co-author of two books that have appeared on The New York Times bestseller list: Good Talk, Dad—written in 2014 with his father Bill Geist—and American Freak Show: The Completely Fabricated Stories of Our New National Treasures, released in 2010. His third book, the self-help satire Loaded! Become a Millionaire Overnight and Lose 20 Pounds in 2 Weeks or Your Money Back!, was released in 2011.

== Early life ==
Geist was born in Evanston, Illinois, the son of newspaper columnist and broadcast journalist Bill Geist and social worker Jody (née Lewis). He is of German, French, English, Irish, and Norwegian descent. Geist is the older brother of Libby Geist Wildes, the Academy Award-winning documentary film producer of O.J.: Made in America and The Last Dance. He is the great-grandson of former Detroit Red Wings star and Hockey Hall of Fame player Herbie Lewis.

Geist attended George Washington Middle School in Ridgewood, New Jersey, where he met his future wife, Christina Sharkey. They began dating at Ridgewood High School, where he was captain of both the basketball and football teams, winning the 1991 state football title. He was elected to New Jersey Boys State and the National Honor Society. Geist graduated cum laude from Vanderbilt University in 1997 with a Bachelor of Arts in political science and French. He was an editor of the school's newspaper, The Vanderbilt Hustler.

== Career ==
Geist began his career as an editor and producer for CNN Sports Illustrated and subsequently as a field producer and reporter for CNN Sports, where he covered the Super Bowl, the NCAA Final Four, and The Masters.

Geist began substituting as a co-host on MSNBC's 6–9 a.m. morning time slot almost immediately after Don Imus was fired in late April 2007. He was named permanent co-host of Morning Joe, along with Joe Scarborough and Mika Brzezinski, in September 2007. In late July 2009, Geist began hosting his own 30-minute program, Way Too Early with Willie Geist, which aired at 5:30 a.m. immediately before Morning Joe on MSNBC. In 2010, he began substituting for Matt Lauer as host of the Today Show and as the show's newsreader. In 2012, Geist became an official co-host of Today and left Way Too Early. In 2016, he was made solo-host of the new Sunday Today that launched in April. Geist has contributed to NBC Sports and NBC News's coverage of every Olympic Games since 2010.

Geist solo anchored NBC's hours-long coverage of the Orlando nightclub shooting on the morning of June 12, 2016. He was on the air for seven successive hours in an NBC News Special Report, which aired across the United States. Geist and Sunday Today earned the prestigious Edward R. Murrow Award for similar coverage on August 4, 2019, the morning after mass shootings in El Paso, Texas, and Dayton, Ohio.

On November 16, 2026, Geist announced he would be leaving Morning Joe at the end of the year and instead take on an expanded role for NBC's Today Show. At the time, he was the last on-air personality to have a role at both NBC News and MS NOW, which had split from NBC a year earlier.

=== Podcast ===
Geist hosts the popular Sunday Sitdown podcast, which features the full-length, unedited versions of his Sunday Today television profile interviews.

In 2025, it was reported that Geist will continue hosting Sunday Today and co-hosting Morning Joe once the corporate separation of MSNBC from NBC News was complete.

On January 22, 2025, Geist hosted the first Sunday Sitdown LIVE at New York's City Winery, interviewing comedian Nate Bargatze in front of a sold-out crowd that traveled from across the country. An edited version of the conversation aired on Sunday TODAY.

=== Other media roles ===
- Geist did voice work in Kung Fu Panda 3 (2016), voicing Sum opposite Al Roker's Dim, and has made cameos in several other movies and television shows.
- He is a frequent guest on Andy Cohen's late night Bravo show Watch What Happens Live, where he often is paired with a Real Housewife.
- Geist has appeared twice in People magazine's "Sexiest Men Alive" issue, in 2012 and 2017.
- In 2019, Geist participated with Jenna Bush Hager in a special episode of How Low Will You Go that aired on the Today Show.
- In 2024, Geist appeared as a fictionalized version of himself on the twelfth season of the HBO show Curb Your Enthusiasm.
- February 16, 2025, Geist hosted the one-hour preshow for "SNL50: The Anniversary Special".
- On March 12, 2025, Geist filled in for Kelly Clarkson as host of The Kelly Clarkson Show.

== Career timeline ==
- (2004–2005): I, Max, Writer/Producer
- (2005–present) MSNBC/NBC News/NBC Sports/MS NOW
  - (2005–2008): Tucker (formerly The Situation with Tucker Carlson)
  - (2006–present): Zeitgeist Host
  - (2006–2007): Scarborough Country
  - (2007–December 2026): Morning Joe Co-Anchor
  - (2009–2012): Way Too Early Host
  - (2011–present): NBC News correspondent
  - (2012–present): NBC Sports contributor
  - (2012–present): Today Show Fourth Hour fill-in co-host
  - (2012–2016): Today Show Third Hour Co-Anchor
  - (2012–present): Today Show 7–9 am contributor and fill-in news, Orange Room and co-anchor
  - (April 17, 2016–present): Sunday Today with Willie Geist Anchor

== Personal life ==
On May 24, 2003, Geist married his high school sweetheart Christina Sharkey, in Humacao, Puerto Rico. The couple has two children. He is an Independent.

Geist sits on the board of the Michael J. Fox Foundation for Parkinson's Research. His father, former New York Times columnist and CBS News journalist Bill Geist, has Parkinson's disease.

Geist is a board member at Operation Mend, an organization at UCLA Medical Center that provides free surgery and care to severely injured military veterans.

On November 7, 2021, Geist ran the 50th annual New York City Marathon to raise money for the Michael J. Fox Foundation. He finished his first marathon in 3:58:23 and raised more than $500,000 for Parkinson's Disease research, entirely in small donations.

He lives in New York.

== Trivia ==
Saturday Night Live cast member Mikey Day impersonates Geist during SNL's sketches about Morning Joe.
