= Bill Geist =

American journalist, author and columnist

- Born: May 10, 1945 (age 81); Champaign, Illinois, U.S.
- Education: University of Illinois Urbana-Champaign, '68; B.A. Communications; University of Missouri, '71; M.A. Communications
- Title: Retired correspondent, CBS News Sunday Morning
- Spouse: Jody Lewis
- Children: Willie Geist; Libby Geist
- Website: CBS bio

William E. Geist is an American retired author, columnist, and television journalist.

== Early life ==
Geist was born on May 10, 1945, in Champaign, Illinois, where he was also raised. He attended the University of Illinois Urbana-Champaign, graduating with a BA in Communications (1968). After graduation, he served in the United States Army as a combat photographer with the 1st Infantry Division in Vietnam, where he was awarded the Bronze Star Medal. After returning to the United States, he attended the University of Missouri, graduating with an MA in Communications (1971).

== Career ==
Geist began his career in 1972 when he joined the Chicago Tribune's Suburban Trib subsidiary, where he worked as a reporter and columnist until 1980.

From 1980 until 1987, he was a columnist for The New York Times; his "About New York" column appeared twice a week.

In August 1987, he joined CBS as a correspondent, where he contributed to CBS Evening News, 60 Minutes II and CBS Sports. He appeared regularly on CBS Sunday Morning hosted by Charles Kuralt and Charles Osgood, where he offered the Everyman's perspective on American pop culture and current events. He announced his retirement on the program on September 16, 2018.

Geist is the bestselling author of a number of books, including:

- Toward a Safe & Sane Halloween & Other Tales of Suburbia (1985)
- The Zucchini Plague and Other Tales of Suburbia (1987)
- City Slickers (1990)
- Little League Confidential: One Coach's Completely Unauthorized Tale of Survival (1992)
- Monster Trucks and Hair in a Can: Who Says America Doesn't Make Anything Anymore? (1994)
- The Big Five-Oh: Facing, Fearing, and Fighting Fifty (1997)
- FORE! PLAY: The Last American Male Takes Up Golf (2001)
- Way Off the Road: Discovering the Peculiar Charms of Small Town America (2007)
- Lake of the Ozarks: My Surreal Summers in a Vanishing America (2019)

== Awards and honors ==
Geist won an Emmy Award in 1992 and 2005. In 2011, he received a star on the Hollywood Walk of Fame. In 2005, he was the commencement speaker at the University of Illinois.

== Personal life ==
Geist and his wife Jody (née Lewis), who were married in June 1970, live in New York City and have two children: Willie Geist, a television personality on NBC and MS NOW; and Libby Geist Wildes, a documentary film producer at ESPN.

On July 1, 2012, Geist confirmed on CBS Sunday Morning that he has Parkinson's disease.

On September 16, 2018, Geist announced his retirement on CBS Sunday Morning.
