= Tucker (2005 TV program) =

- Presented by: Tucker Carlson; Bill Wolff
- Country of origin: United States
- Original language: English
- No. of episodes: 201

Production
- Running time: 60 minutes

Original release
- Network: MSNBC
- Release: June 13, 2005 – March 14, 2008

Tucker (stylized as >TUCKER) is an American television program on MSNBC that focused on politics, hosted by Tucker Carlson. The show aired from June 13, 2005 to March 14, 2008.

== The Situation with Tucker Carlson ==
In February 2005 Carlson was signed by MSNBC to host a primetime show slated to debut in the second quarter of 2005. It debuted on June 13, 2005. Prior to July 10, 2006, the program was known as The Situation with Tucker Carlson. In the program, Carlson debated with a number of guests: one segment involving a liberal and one with former Around the Horn sports show host Max Kellerman. Kellerman would provide an argument against Carlson's opinion, regardless of whether he himself disagreed with Carlson. This style prompted comparisons to sports talk shows that use a similar format, such as ESPN's Pardon the Interruption. Tucker was produced by Bill Wolff, who worked with Kellerman on two other PTI-styled sports shows, Around the Horn and I, Max.

In addition, Carlson interviewed guests, most often politicians or newsmakers. The show aired on MSNBC weekdays at 6 PM ET. Commercials for the show branded it as Tucker (Live).

== Segments ==
The show had seven regular segments. This format was generally followed, except in such extraordinary cases as the two episodes broadcast from London after the July 7 bombings and episodes broadcast during (and after) Hurricanes Katrina and Rita.

First, there was an opening segment in which Carlson introduces his panelist and debates four to five news stories with him or her. Second, in "Crime Blotter," Carlson introduced three stories about "wrongdoing and justice served" and typically discussed one of them with a guest, usually via satellite, on a number of topics related to a situation. Third, in "The Outsider," Carlson debated a variety of news-inspired issues with Max Kellerman, who played devil's advocate regardless of his personal viewpoint. Fourth, in "Curious Situation", Carlson introduced a story in the news and was joined by a guest, usually via satellite and typically pre-recorded, to discuss this situation. Fifth, in "First Look", Carlson was joined by his senior producer, Willie Geist, to take a look at tomorrow's news. Sixth, in "Voicemail", viewers were encouraged to call in and leave messages for Carlson. Four to five messages, on a variety of topics ranging from stories that aired on the program to a drinking game for the show to Carlson's bow tie, were aired and commented on. Finally, in "The Cutting Room Floor," Carlson joked about non-serious stories with Geist, son of Bill Geist from CBS.

The original format of the program, prior to its move to 11 p.m. on August 8, 2005, initially had six regular segments. First, there was a segment in which Carlson introduced his two panelists and debated five to six news stories with them. Second, in "Op-Ed Op-Ed," Carlson introduced three editorials from newspapers nationwide and debated them with the panelists. Third, in "Free Speak," Tucker spoke with a politician or newsmaker, usually via satellite, on a number of topics related to his or her situation. The fourth segment followed the same structure as the first. Fifth, in "The Outsider," Carlson debated a variety of news-inspired issues with Max Kellerman. Finally, "The Cutting Room Floor" segment of the show remained the same.

After the show changed its name to Tucker and time slots to 6 p.m., "The Outsider" was removed and new segments like "Beat the Press" were added. The segments were later dropped, replaced with a panel discussion with two or three guests. It usually ran two–three segments.

When Geist moved to Morning Joe, the last segment that regularly featured him instead had fellow MSNBC producer and contributor Bill Wolff.

== Cancellation by MSNBC ==
Tucker was cancelled by MSNBC and replaced with Race for the White House with David Gregory, until December 2008 when Gregory became a moderator of Meet the Press. The last airing was shown on March 14, 2008. Carlson continued to be a political contributor to MSNBC until May 19, 2009 when he was hired as a Fox News contributor.

== Guests ==
There were rotating guests, including MSNBC political analyst Pat Buchanan, The Hill associate editor A.B. Stoddard, Democratic strategist Peter Fenn, Newsweek magazine's Richard Wolffe and Democratic analyst Hilary Rosen.

Substitute hosts in the past included MSNBC's Alison Stewart and Chris Jansing, WABC radio host Curtis Sliwa, sports host Max Kellerman (himself a former frequent guest), and Willie Geist. Geist could be seen at the end of most editions in a segment called "In Other News," similar in format to "The Cutting Room Floor." On February 7, 2008, substitute host David Shuster made controversial comments regarding Chelsea Clinton, resulting in his suspension from MSNBC.

== Broadcasts outside United States ==
MSNBC and NBC News programming is shown for several hours a day on the 24-hour news network Orbit News in Europe and the Middle East. This included Tucker and several other MSNBC shows.
