= 1600 Pennsylvania Avenue (disambiguation) =

1600 Pennsylvania Avenue is the formal address of the White House, the residence of the president of the United States.

1600 Pennsylvania Avenue may also refer to:

- 1600 Pennsylvania Avenue (musical), a 1976 musical with music by Leonard Bernstein and book and lyrics by Alan Jay Lerner
- 1600 Pennsylvania Avenue (TV series), a panel show on MSNBC previously known as Race for the White House
- 1600 Penn, an NBC sitcom that aired from December 2012 to March 2013 about the dysfunctional family of a fictional US president
