= Susan Filan =

American lawyer

Susan F. Filan (née Freedman) (born August 24, 1959) is a Senior Legal Analyst for MSNBC, former prosecutor for the State of Connecticut, and a trial lawyer.

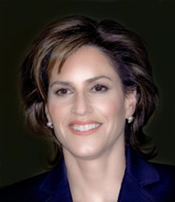

== Education ==
Filan holds an undergraduate and graduate degree in Anthropology from the University of Michigan, Ann Arbor. She earned her law degree from the Quinnipiac College School Of Law in Hamden, CT. In 2021, she received her LLM in Indigenous Peoples Law and Policy (IPLP) from University of Arizona Law.

== Career ==
In 1991, she began her career as a criminal defense attorney for a legal aid clinic, in New Haven, CT, representing indigent defendants charged with crimes. She then went into private practice where she specialized in criminal defense and matrimonial law at both the trial and appellate level in state and federal court. In 1998, Filan was hired by the State Attorney's office for The Division of Criminal Justice which consists of the Office of the Chief State's Attorney and the State's Attorneys for each of the 13 Judicial Districts in Connecticut. She was assigned to the Gang and Continuing Crime Unit. In 2003, Filan transferred to the Judicial District of Fairfield at Bridgeport as an Assistant State's Attorney (prosecutor).

=== TV Legal Analyst ===
In May 2005, Filan began providing commentary on MSNBC, Fox News, CNN, Court TV, ABC News, CBS News, and BBC News. During the Michael Jackson trial, she was hired by NBC News and MSNBC to provide exclusive legal analysis. She also provided legal analysis for the Scott Peterson trial. In 2006, she was promoted to MSNBC Senior Analyst.

In addition to appearing as an analyst on MSNBC's daytime and primetime programs, Filan also has served as a guest host for "The Abrams Report."

She is a regular contributor to Women in Crime Ink, described by the Wall Street Journal as "a blog worth reading."

== Credentials ==
Filan is admitted to practice before the Supreme Court of the United States, the United States Court of Appeals for the Second Circuit, the United States District Court for the District of Connecticut and the Courts of the State of Connecticut. She had a column on MSNBC.com called the Filan Files.

She was the past president of the Board of Quinnipiac University School of Law Alumni Association and an Alternate on the Local Grievance Panel for the Judicial District of New Haven.
