= Julianna Goldman =

American journalist

- Born: May 2, 1981 (age 45); Bethesda, Maryland, U.S.
- Education: Barnard College; Columbia University
- Occupation: Television journalist
- Spouse(s): David Shuster (2007-2011); Michael Gottlieb (2014-present)

Julianna Goldman (born May 2, 1981) is an American television journalist who was a CBS News correspondent based in Washington, D.C. between 2014 and 2018 In 2010 she founded of MamaDen, a platform that connects and empowers mothers.

== Early life and education ==
Goldman is the daughter of Barbara Goldberg-Goldman and Michael Goldman. Her father is a partner in Silverberg Goldman & Bikoff, a Washington law firm. Her mother is the founder and president of a human resources agency and sits on the board of the National Jewish Democratic Council. She attended Charles E. Smith Jewish Day School in Rockville, Maryland, for all of her primary and secondary schooling. She attended Barnard College of Columbia University and graduated magna cum laude in 2003. She currently is pursuing a master's degree in government with a concentration in national security studies from Johns Hopkins University. She is of Jewish descent.

== Career ==
Goldman reported on President Barack Obama’s signing of the START Treaty, his acceptance of the Nobel Peace Prize in Oslo, Norway, as well as Obama's first economic summit in China. Goldman also writes on White House domestic policy including coverage of the Administration's handling of the BP Oil Spill and the President's economic policy agenda. She was dubbed one of the Obama "Originals" for her coverage of the 2008 campaign.

In October 2010, she was named one of The Power 30 Under 30, a ranking of the most influential people in Washington D.C. under the age of 30. In addition, she was featured in the Capitol File profile of White House correspondents under 40.

== Personal ==
On May 27, 2007, she married MSNBC journalist David Shuster at the Sixth & I Historic Synagogue in Washington, D.C. On January 10, 2011, the Washington Post reported Goldman and Shuster had separated; they subsequently divorced that year. The couple had no children.

On July 12, 2014, she married Michael Julian Gottlieb, a former associate White House counsel under the Obama administration in 2009 and 2011–13. The two were wed by Supreme Court Justice Elena Kagan at the Pine Creek Cookhouse restaurant in Aspen, Colorado.
