= Max Kellerman =

American sports radio host and commentator

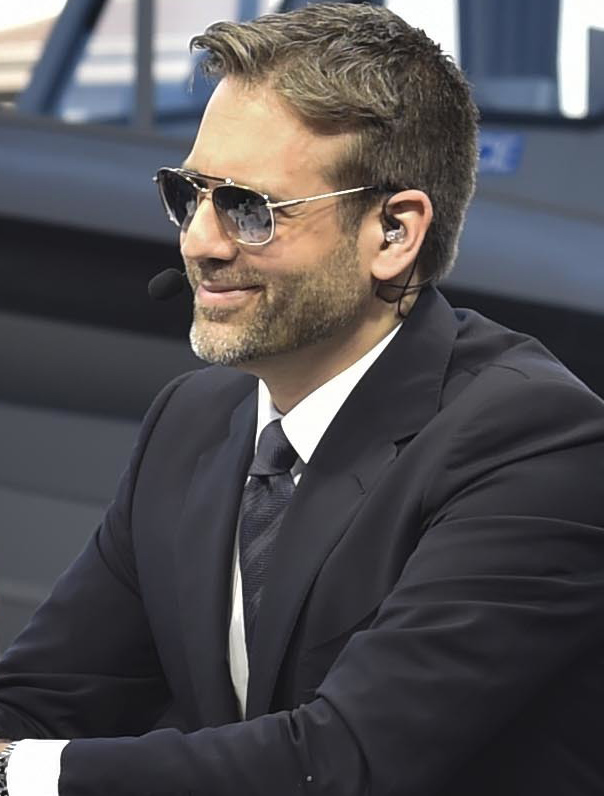
- Kellerman in 2016
- Born: August 6, 1973 (age 53); New York City, New York, U.S.
- Education: Columbia University (BA)
- Years active: 1989–present
- Spouse: Erin Manning
- Children: 3

Max Kellerman (born August 6, 1973) is an American sports television personality and boxing commentator. Until his departure from ESPN in June 2023, he was the host of This Just In with Max Kellerman and the co-host of Keyshawn, JWill and Max on ESPN Radio. He previously was a co-host of ESPN talk show First Take alongside Stephen A. Smith and Molly Qerim. He also previously was the co-host of the sports radio talk show Max & Marcellus, with Marcellus Wiley, on ESPNLA. Kellerman hosted the ESPN panel talk show Around the Horn from the show's inception in 2002 until 2004 and co-hosted the sports comedy talk show SportsNation, alongside Wiley and Michelle Beadle, from 2013 until 2016. He was also a studio commentator with Brian Kenny on Friday Night Fights and a color commentator for HBO World Championship Boxing and Boxing After Dark.

== Career ==
=== Sports broadcasting ===
Kellerman's first broadcasting experience was as a teenager on a New York City public-access television cable TV program on professional boxing called Max on Boxing. Given the medium, the show was quite simple but nevertheless caught the attention of the boxing community, including a young Mike Tyson.

In the late 1990s after graduating from Columbia University with a degree in history, Kellerman was hired as an analyst on ESPN's boxing series Friday Night Fights where he met future radio partner Brian Kenny. In November 2002 he was given his own show and, influenced by Pardon the Interruption, became the architect and original host of ESPN's Around the Horn. While the show was incredibly popular, Kellerman and ESPN could not reach an agreement for him to remain with the network, and Kellerman left the network in early 2004 to host a new show called I, Max on Fox Sports Net. He would discuss sports news with Michael Holley, former Around the Horn panelist, and Bill Wolff.

Max took time off from the show after the death of his brother. He later returned, but despite his show garnering the network's highest ratings for a period of time, it was canceled by Fox. The last I, Max show aired on February 18, 2005. Max also was the co-host of Spike TV's 2006 series, King of Vegas.

In 2005, Tucker Carlson announced that Kellerman would be a permanent contributor on his MSNBC show Tucker. On a segment of the show called "The Outsider", Kellerman generally took the position selected by Carlson. Frequently, Carlson introduced Kellerman with a bio containing a humorously enthusiastic compliment. The show was canceled in March 2008.

Starting in the week of August 21, 2006, Kellerman did at least two nights of audition shows at 7 pm for WEPN, a ESPN Radio station in New York City, hosting one night with Sid Rosenberg. On August 28, 2006, it was announced that Brandon Tierney would be taking over at 7 pm, which temporarily left Kellerman without a timeslot. On October 23, 2006, Max began hosting the 10 am to noon program on WEPN, replacing ESPN's nationally broadcast Colin Cowherd program.

In September 2007, Kellerman began hosting a third hour, extending the show to 1 pm. Two months later, ESPNEWS and SportsCenter host Brian Kenny joined the show as co-host. On February 4, 2008, the show was added to XM Radio on ESPN Xtra. In the fall of 2008, Kenny left the radio program to attend to his SportsCenter duties and the program was again named The Max Kellerman Show.

Kellerman and ESPN Radio mutually ended their relationship on March 9, 2009. Evening host Brandon Tierney temporarily filled in Kellerman, and Colin Cowherd took his timeslot.

Kellerman continued his boxing broadcast work at HBO. He was originally hired for the network's Boxing After Dark telecasts, working alongside Fran Charles and Lennox Lewis. In 2007, Kellerman moved up to the HBO World Championship Boxing main team alongside Jim Lampley, Harold Lederman, and a rotating guest analyst, usually Roy Jones Jr. or Emanuel Steward.

On May 12, 2010, it was announced Kellerman had been hired by CNN: "Kellerman will weigh in on sports and pop culture issues on CNN American Morning and other programs. He has previously served as a contributor to MSNBC."

Kellerman was announced in December 2010 as the new midday host at ESPN Radio station KSPN in Los Angeles, alongside former NFL player co-host Marcellus Wiley, replacing LA Sports Live with Andrew Siciliano and former NBA player Mychal Thompson. Program director Mike Thompson (no relation to Mychal Thompson), who hired Kellerman, had worked with Kellerman at WEPN.

In May 2015, Kellerman covered the Floyd Mayweather Jr. vs. Manny Pacquiao boxing match for HBO. He received criticism online for his post-match interview with Manny Pacquiao. The Guardian stated that his line of questioning was, "interpreted as patronizing" as his wording to Pacquiao was "You thought you won today, Why?" However, Kellerman retorted that he "had to ask him" about his disagreement with the judges' adjudication.

Kellerman replaced Skip Bayless on ESPN's First Take as co-analyst alongside Stephen A. Smith and host Molly Qerim, effective July 25, 2016.

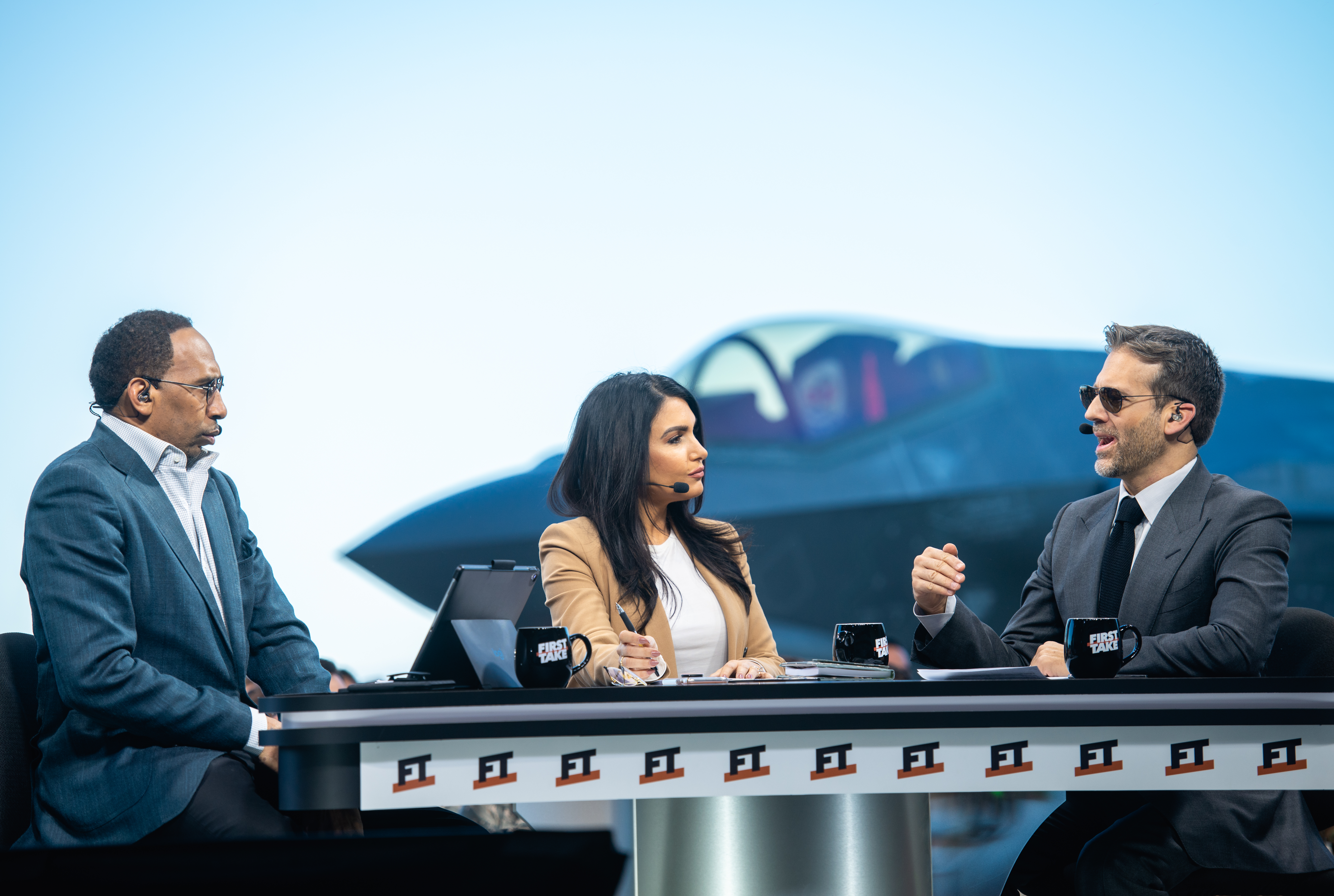
Kellerman (right) at ESPN First Take, 2018

With HBO leaving the boxing business at the end of 2018, Kellerman signed a multiyear contract with ESPN which greatly expanded his role in the network's boxing coverage. However, in contrast to his color-commentary role with HBO, for ESPN he presided over network coverage from the broadcast desk rather than at ringside.

Kellerman departed from First Take in September 2021 after Stephen A. Smith requested his removal, citing a lack of chemistry necessary for the show’s long-term success. Kellerman was subsequently laid off from ESPN in June 2023.

In June 2025, Dana White announced that Kellerman would provide commentary for Netflix's presentation of the Canelo Álvarez vs. Terence Crawford fight card on September 13, 2025. The event marked Kellerman's first broadcasting appearance since his departure from ESPN. His comments on White and Zuffa Boxing were criticized as "inappropriately fawning".

=== Acting ===
Kellerman made a brief appearance in the 2006 film Rocky Balboa alongside Lampley and Merchant, who served as the broadcast team for the fight between Rocky and Mason "The Line" Dixon. He would also make an appearance in the 2015 film Creed, as the reporter interviewing Donnie Creed at the conclusion of his fight with "Pretty" Ricky Conlan. Kellerman played himself in the short film The Wedding Bout.

Kellerman played himself in Real Husbands of Hollywood.

== Personal life ==
Kellerman was born in The Bronx, and grew up in the Greenwich Village area of New York City. He graduated from New York City's PS 41 in Greenwich Village, Hunter College High School in 1991 and, later, Columbia University in 1998.

His younger brother Sam was a freelance writer who also covered professional boxing. In 2004, Sam's body was found inside his apartment in Los Angeles. As a result of the ensuing investigation, former boxer James Butler was arrested and charged with Sam's murder. He later confessed to voluntary manslaughter and arson and was given a 29-year sentence.

Kellerman and his wife have three daughters.

Kellerman pointed out on Tucker that "Max" is not short for anything, and that he does not have a middle name. He is active in Jewish cultural activities and, according to The Forward and the Yiddish Book Center, speaks Yiddish. A hip hop fan, evidenced by his intro music on his ESPN Radio show, Kellerman's favorite artists include the Wu-Tang Clan, having stated on his radio show that Raekwon's Only Built 4 Cuban Linx... is one of his favorite albums. He was a member of a hip-hop group with his brother Sam, under the name "Max and Sam". They were signed under Columbia Records in 1994 and recorded a music video titled "Young Man Rumble".

Kellerman has a small permanent scar on the left side of his mouth from a childhood accident with an electrical outlet.

Kellerman is a fan of the New York Giants and New York Yankees.
