= Beth Wilkinson =

American lawyer

- Born: Beth Ann Wilkinson; September 19, 1962 (age 64); Saratoga Springs, New York, U.S.
- Education: Princeton University (BA); University of Virginia (JD)
- Occupation: Lawyer
- Spouse: David Gregory
- Children: 3
- Military career
- Allegiance: United States
- Branch: United States Army
- Service years: 1987–1991
- Rank: Captain

Beth Ann Wilkinson (born September 19, 1962) is an American lawyer based in Washington, D.C. She is a founding partner of Wilkinson Stekloff, a specialty trial and litigation law firm. Wilkson was formerly a partner at Paul, Weiss, Rifkind, Wharton & Garrison, where she worked in their Washington, D.C. office focusing on white collar criminal defense. Wilkinson began her legal career as a commissioned officer in the U.S. Army Judge Advocate General's Corps, and she has also served as an Assistant United States Attorney in New York City.

As a U.S. Justice Department lawyer in the 1990s, Wilkinson was a member of the team led by Merrick Garland that prosecuted Oklahoma City bombing perpetrator Timothy McVeigh. Wilkinson became known for successfully arguing that McVeigh should receive the death penalty. She has also been a critic of unfair administration of the death penalty.

== Early life and education ==
Wilkinson was born on September 19, 1962, in Saratoga Springs, New York. Her father, Robert Wilkinson, was a U.S. Navy submarine captain who became the director of the Hanford Site nuclear complex. Wilkinson graduated from Princeton University in 1984 with a Bachelor of Arts, magna cum laude, and from the University of Virginia School of Law in 1987 with a Juris Doctor.

== Career ==
She joined the United States Army's Judge Advocate General Corps (JAG Corps) after law school, serving at the rank of Captain as an assistant for intelligence and special operations in the office of the Army's general counsel. That office detailed her as a Special Assistant U.S. Attorney for the Southern District of Florida to assist with the use of classified information in the prosecution of Panamanian military leader Manuel Noriega. In April 2012, she was hired as outside counsel by the Federal Trade Commission to lead an antitrust inquiry into Google.

=== Justice Department ===
After completing her four-year obligation to the U.S. Army, Wilkinson became a full-time Assistant U.S. Attorney for the Eastern District of New York in 1991, prosecuting various kinds of cases including narcotics, white collar offenses, and violent crimes. Among her cases was the first United States prosecution of a bombing of an airliner—the 1994 case against Colombian narcoterrorist Dandeny Muñoz Mosquera, whom she successfully prosecuted for the bombing of an Avianca civilian airliner as well as murder of U.S. citizens and other drug-related crimes.

Wilkinson won the Justice Department's highest honor, The Attorney General's Exceptional Service Award, for her work on the Mosquera case. She then became special counsel to the deputy attorney general, advising the top management of the department on criminal policy and investigations. She was promoted to principal deputy of the Department's Terrorism and Violent Crime Section, and it was in that capacity that she participated in the trial team in U.S. vs. McVeigh and Terry Nichols. She won the Attorney General's Exceptional Service Award an unprecedented second time.

=== After the Justice Department ===
After leaving the Justice Department, Wilkinson became a co-chair with Gerald Kogan of the Constitution Project's Death Penalty Committee of the Criminal Justice Program, "a bipartisan committee of death penalty supporters and opponents who all agree that the risk of wrongful executions in this country has become too high." She also became a partner in Latham & Watkins, LLP, Washington, D.C., where she co-chaired the White Collar Practice Group and advised clients on internal investigations.

=== Fannie Mae ===
In 2006, Fannie Mae recruited Wilkinson as parts of its effort to rebuild its relationship with regulators after accounting scandals and complaints about its corporate culture. Her compensation at Fannie Mae was not disclosed when she was hired. She served as Fannie Mae's executive vice president, general counsel and corporate secretary from February 2006 until September 2008.

She resigned her position at Fannie Mae along with three other senior executives on September 19, 2008, after the troubled mortgage giant was taken over by the government.

=== Paul Weiss Partner ===
In 2009, Wilkinson was elected to partnership in the prominent New York City law firm Paul, Weiss, Rifkind, Wharton & Garrison LLP. According to the firm's website, Wilkinson's practice would focus on general litigation. In September 2018, NBC News reported that Wilkinson was assisting Supreme Court nominee Brett Kavanaugh in his response to the allegation that he sexually assaulted Christine Blasey Ford while they were in high school.

=== Hillary Clinton email controversy ===
In a letter addressed to Congress on February 10, 2016, Wilkinson announced that she was representing four of Hillary Clinton's closest aides: Cheryl Mills, Heather Samuelson, Jake Sullivan, and Philippe Reines.

=== Michael Flynn case ===
In June 2020, Wilkinson represented Federal Judge Emmet G. Sullivan before the United States Court of Appeals for the District of Columbia Circuit, which was concerned with resolving former National Security Advisor Michael Flynn's petition for writ of mandamus in a criminal proceeding against General Flynn. As the trial judge, Sullivan didn't immediately grant a United States Department of Justice request to drop criminal charges against Flynn, subsequent to Flynn's guilty plea, but instead appointed retired United States District Judge John Gleeson as an Amicus curiae, "friend of the court," and scheduled an oral argument on government's motion. Before the hearing, the Washington Post described Sullivan's hiring of an attorney as a "rare step that adds to this criminal case's already unusual path". On June 24, the DC Circuit court panel granted Flynn's petition in a 2-1 ruling, "direct[ing] the district court to grant the government's Rule 48(a) motion to dismiss ... [and] vacat[ing] the district court's order appointing an amicus as moot," with Judge Rao writing for the majority and Judge Wilkins dissenting, and the panel unanimously denied the request that the case be reassigned to another judge.

While initially a loss for Wilkinson, the DC Circuit court agreed to re-hear the case again pursuant to an en banc hearing. Ultimately, the DC Circuit on August 31 reversed the panel's decision, denied Flynn's counsel request for a writ of mandamus and denied the request to assign the case to a different judge, allowing Sullivan to rule on the Justice Department motion to drop or uphold the prosecution. A substantial win for Wilkinson, the Judges Karen Henderson, a George W. Bush appointee and Neomi Rao, a Donald Trump appointee dissented in the 8-2 decision. The two judges who ruled in favor of Flynn in June, Rao and Henderson, also reversed their earlier position that the case should not be taken from Sullivan and assigned to another judge in their dissent.

=== Washington Football Team ===
In July 2020, Wilkinson was hired to investigate claims of sexual harassment and other workplace-related misconduct within the Washington Football Team, an American football organization belonging to the National Football League (NFL). The investigation was initially overseen by team owner Daniel Snyder before the NFL took over the following month. It was concluded in July 2021, with an oral report given to the league that led to the team being fined $10 million after several incidents of sexual harassment, bullying, and intimidation were found to be commonplace under Snyder's ownership.

== Personal ==
Wilkinson was previously married to Timothy Ogilvie. The marriage ended in divorce. She married David Gregory, former moderator of NBC News' Meet the Press, in June 2000. They have three children. Her husband practices Judaism while she is a Methodist.
