= Peter Fenn =

American political consultant

Peter Fenn

Peter H. Fenn (born December 12, 1947) is a Democratic Party political strategist, consultant, television commentator and owner of Fenn Communications Group, a political and public affairs media firm based in Washington, DC in the United States. The firm has worked in over 300 campaigns, from presidential to mayoral, and represented a number of Fortune 500 companies.

== Career ==
In 1983, Peter Fenn founded a political consulting firm, becoming Fenn-King-Murphy-Putnam Communications after a partnership with Tom King in 1987. In 2003, Fenn incorporated as the Fenn Communications Group. Since its inception, Fenn and staff have assisted several Democratic candidates in the United States, including vice presidential candidate Geraldine Ferraro, Senator Paul Simon, and members of Congress David Bonior, Dave Obey and Nita Lowey. In addition to political campaigns, they have aided clients such as General Motors, Lockheed Martin, 3M, National Association of Realtors, The Brookings Institution and the Humane Society of the United States in providing strategic communications advice and producing image and issue advertising.

In 1996 and 1998, Fenn and his firm (then Fenn-King-Murphy-Putnam Communications) were chosen as the lead media consultants for the Democratic Congressional Campaign Committee, producing ads that helped win back seats for the Democrats. In campaign 2000, Fenn served as a surrogate spokesperson on cable news programs for Gore for President. He performed the same role in 2004 for the Kerry for President campaign and in 2008 for Obama for President.

Prior to forming the firm, Fenn was the first executive director of Democrats for the 80's, a political action committee founded by Pamela Harriman and then-Governor Bill Clinton. Fenn also served on the staff of the Senate Intelligence Committee and as Washington Chief of Staff for Senator Frank Church. In 1983, Fenn aided in the founding and was the first executive director of OpenSecrets.

Fenn has consulted overseas for the Agency for International Development and the National Endowment for Democracy. He produced television programs in Russia, Bosnia, Nicaragua and the Dominican Republic, and consulted for political parties and candidates in such countries as South Africa, Mozambique, Romania, Latvia, Colombia, Northern Ireland and Hungary.

== Academics ==
Peter Fenn has a B.A. from Macalester College, where he was President of the Alumni Association and a past member of the Board of Trustees He earned a M.A. in International Relations from the University of Southern California.

Since 1985, Fenn has served as an adjunct professor at George Washington's Graduate School of Political Management.

== Media contributions ==
Fenn was a rotating guest on Tucker, along with political analyst Pat Buchanan, until the show's end in March 2008. He also served as a guest host on CNN's Crossfire and The Spin Room, as well as MSNBC's Equal Time. Fenn appears frequently as a TV commentator on the major networks and on cable news shows.

Fenn also writes regular columns for several DC papers and blogs, including The Hill’s Pundit’s Blog, Politico, and U.S. News & World Report.

== Awards ==
Peter Fenn was selected by Campaigns & Elections Magazine as a "Rising Star" as a political media consultant and as a "Mover and Shaker" in 1995. His writing and producing have also earned him Pollie Awards from the American Association of Political Consultants, Telly Awards, Summit Awards, Vision Awards and the award from PRNews for the Best Public Service Ad Campaign of 2005.
