= David Shuster =

American television journalist

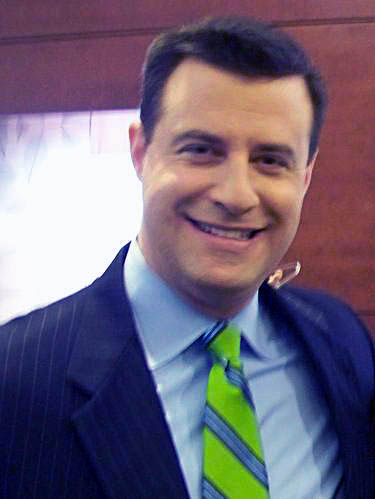
- Shuster in 2008
- Born: David Martin Shuster; July 22, 1967 (age 59); Bloomington, Indiana, U.S.
- Education: University of Michigan; Georgetown University
- Spouses: Julianna Goldman (m. 2007; div. 2011) Kera Rennert (m. 2013)
- Children: 2
- Awards: Disabled American Veterans' Bugle Award (2006); Emmy Award (1996)

David Martin Shuster (born July 22, 1967) is an American television journalist. Shuster previously served as principal anchor and managing editor for i24 News, previously working as an anchor for MSNBC and worked for Fox News, CNN, Current TV, The Young Turks, and Al Jazeera America.

Shuster's career at MSNBC included anchoring prime time breaking news coverage of the death of Michael Jackson, the passage in Congress of historic health care reform, and the deadly earthquake in Haiti. He was suspended from MSNBC in April 2010 after secretly auditioning for a new CNN show. After MSNBC, Shuster was hired to serve as "primary substitute anchor" for Current TV's re-launch of Countdown with Keith Olbermann. In January 2012, Shuster began hosting his own syndicated political talk radio show. In July 2013, he was hired to host a show on Al Jazeera America.

== Early and personal life ==
Shuster was born to a Jewish family in Bloomington, Indiana, the son of Arnold Shuster of Bloomington and Susan Klein of Nashville, Indiana, and stepson of Robert Agranoff (married to his mother) and Rose Mahern-Shuster (married to his father). He has one living brother, Jonathan.

David Shuster graduated in 1985 from Bloomington High School South, and with honors from the University of Michigan. He earned a Master's in Public Policy at Georgetown University. He married journalist Julianna Goldman on May 27, 2007, at the Sixth & I Historic Synagogue in Washington, D.C. On January 10, 2011, The Washington Post reported that Goldman and Shuster had separated. They had no children.

On July 23, 2012, Shuster announced his engagement to Kera Rennert, a television writer and producer. Shuster and Rennert married on February 16, 2013, at the Angel Orensanz Foundation for Contemporary Art in New York City and had their first child in 2013.

== Career ==
=== Early career ===
Shuster started his journalism career at CNN's Washington, D.C. bureau. He was an assignment editor and field producer from 1990 to 1994, covering both the Persian Gulf War and the 1992 presidential election campaign. Shuster left CNN in 1994 to become a political reporter for the ABC affiliate KATV in Little Rock, Arkansas, covering the Whitewater scandal. During this period, Shuster led KATV's coverage of the indictment, trial, conviction, and resignation of Arkansas Governor Jim Guy Tucker. At KATV, Shuster won a regional Emmy Awards for investigative journalism for his reporting on a manufactured housing scandal.

=== Fox News ===
From 1996 to 2002, Shuster was a Washington, D.C.–based correspondent for the Fox News Channel. He was at The Pentagon at the time of the September 11, 2001 attacks and led Fox's coverage of U.S. military operations in Afghanistan. During the Clinton Administration, Shuster led Fox's coverage of the Clinton investigations including Whitewater, the Monica Lewinsky scandal, the Starr Report and the Senate impeachment trial. Shuster was a member of Fox's You Decide 2000 political team. He spent four months on John McCain's "Straight Talk Express" bus and was Fox's lead correspondent for McCain's presidential campaign.

=== MSNBC ===
Shuster left Fox News for MSNBC/NBC in 2002. In early 2003, he traveled to Qatar, where he provided coverage from the United States Central Command during Operation Iraqi Freedom for hourly live reports in prime time. Later, he was in California for two months for MSNBC's television program Hardball with Chris Matthews as lead correspondent on the 2003 California recall election, in which Governor Gray Davis was recalled and actor Arnold Schwarzenegger was elected. In 2004 he led the show's coverage of the presidential campaign, including leading the "ad watch team," which analyzed 150 campaign ads. In all, he filed more than 700 correspondent reports for the show.

Occasionally, Shuster filled in for Chris Matthews on Hardball, including an interview of former President Jimmy Carter. During the trial relating to the Plame affair, Shuster blogged for Hardball on Hardblogger about the Lewis "Scooter" Libby trial and about other political matters. He also filled in for commentator Keith Olbermann on Countdown. In August 2005, Shuster reported from the eye of Hurricane Katrina as it made landfall in Biloxi, Mississippi; His reports aired on MSNBC and NBC Nightly News. He spent several weeks reporting on the aftermath of Hurricane Katrina from New Orleans.

On September 24, 2007, Shuster interviewed Congresswoman Marsha Blackburn while filling in on Tucker Carlson's show. When Shuster asked about her response to the MoveOn.org ad campaign concerning General David Petraeus's Iraq War testimony, he followed up by asking her the name of the last soldier from her congressional district who had been killed in Iraq. She was not able to name the soldier. Shuster then said the soldier was 18-year-old Jeremy Bohannon, and asked Blackburn why she was unable to recall the name. Blackburn's office claimed that Bohannon was not actually from Blackburn's congressional district, but was from the congressional district of Rep. John Tanner. However, while Bohannon did grow up in Tanner's district, his legal residence for the year prior to his enlistment was in Blackburn's district.

During his MSNBC tenure, he anchored MSNBC Live and filled in for Keith Olbermann, Chris Matthews, Ed Schultz, and Rachel Maddow on their respective shows. Shuster was MSNBC's lead "breaking news anchor", and anchored prime-time coverage of several stories including the death of Michael Jackson, congressional votes for health care reform, and the 2010 Haiti earthquake. After the promotion of David Gregory to Meet the Press in December 2008, Shuster was named host of MSNBC's 6p show, 1600 Pennsylvania Avenue.

==== Chelsea Clinton remark and suspension ====
On February 7, 2008, while he was guest-hosting on Tucker, Shuster discussed Chelsea Clinton's campaigning for her mother Hillary Clinton, her efforts to influence superdelegates and her refusal to answer any questions by the media. When his guest, Bill Press, pointed out that Bush's daughters campaigned for their father, Shuster noted the different access rules in each case and responded, "There's just something a little bit unseemly to me that Chelsea's out there calling up celebrities, saying 'support my mom' ... doesn't it seem like Chelsea's sort of being pimped out in some weird sort of way?"

The Clinton campaign demanded an apology and stated that Clinton might not participate in any further primary debates on MSNBC. Shuster was suspended for two weeks from all NBC News and MSNBC appearances for his comments. Before the suspension, Shuster had engaged in a heated e-mail exchange with a Clinton staffer in which he defended his remarks.

==== Departure from MSNBC ====
On April 6, 2010, MSNBC announced that it had suspended Shuster for an "indefinite period" after the network learned from press reports that he and Michel Martin of National Public Radio had taped a pilot episode for a new show on CNN without the formal approval of MSNBC.

=== Current TV ===
On June 6, 2011, Keith Olbermann and Current TV announced that Shuster was hired to serve as "primary substitute anchor" for the network's re-launch of Countdown with Keith Olbermann. Starting July 29, 2011, Shuster became a regular guest-host of Countdown. The series ended on March 30, 2012, but Shuster remained as correspondent for the network.

=== Internet venture ===
Shuster announced in February 2011 that he was seeking to launch a website for investigative journalism.

=== Talk radio ===
In January 2012, Shuster began to host his own political talk radio show, Take Action News with David Shuster, on WPWC, a local progressive talk radio station in Washington, D.C. In March of that year, the program entered syndication with WCPT in Chicago joining as the first affiliate. In December, the program started internet video production via YouTube, produced by The David Pakman Show.

=== Al Jazeera America ===
On July 21, 2013, The Huffington Post reported that Shuster had accepted a hosting position at Al Jazeera America anchoring live news shows and hosting a politics analysis show, called Power Politics. In April 2016, Al Jazeera ceased broadcasting on cable TV across the United States. Shuster has since appeared on MSNBC's Morning Joe.

=== i24 News ===
On February 9, 2017, it was announced that Shuster had been named anchor and managing editor of the American arm of i24 News, just four days before the network began its broadcasting.

=== TYT Network ===
In 2020, Shuster began appearing as a regular contributor to Rebel HQ, a YouTube channel that is part of The Young Turks's network.
