= The Vanderbilt Hustler =

Vanderbilt University student newspaper

- The front page of The Vanderbilt Hustler on October 17, 2008
- Type: Student newspaper
- Format: Online only
- Editor-in-chief: Jacob Stoebner
- Managing editor: Rhea Patney
- Staff writers: 37
- Founded: 1888; 135 years ago
- Language: English
- Headquarters: Nashville, Tennessee
- Website: vanderbilthustler.com

The Vanderbilt Hustler (sometimes abbreviated as The Hustler) is the main student newspaper at Vanderbilt University in Nashville, Tennessee. Founded in 1888, it is the oldest continuously published student newspaper in Tennessee.

== History ==
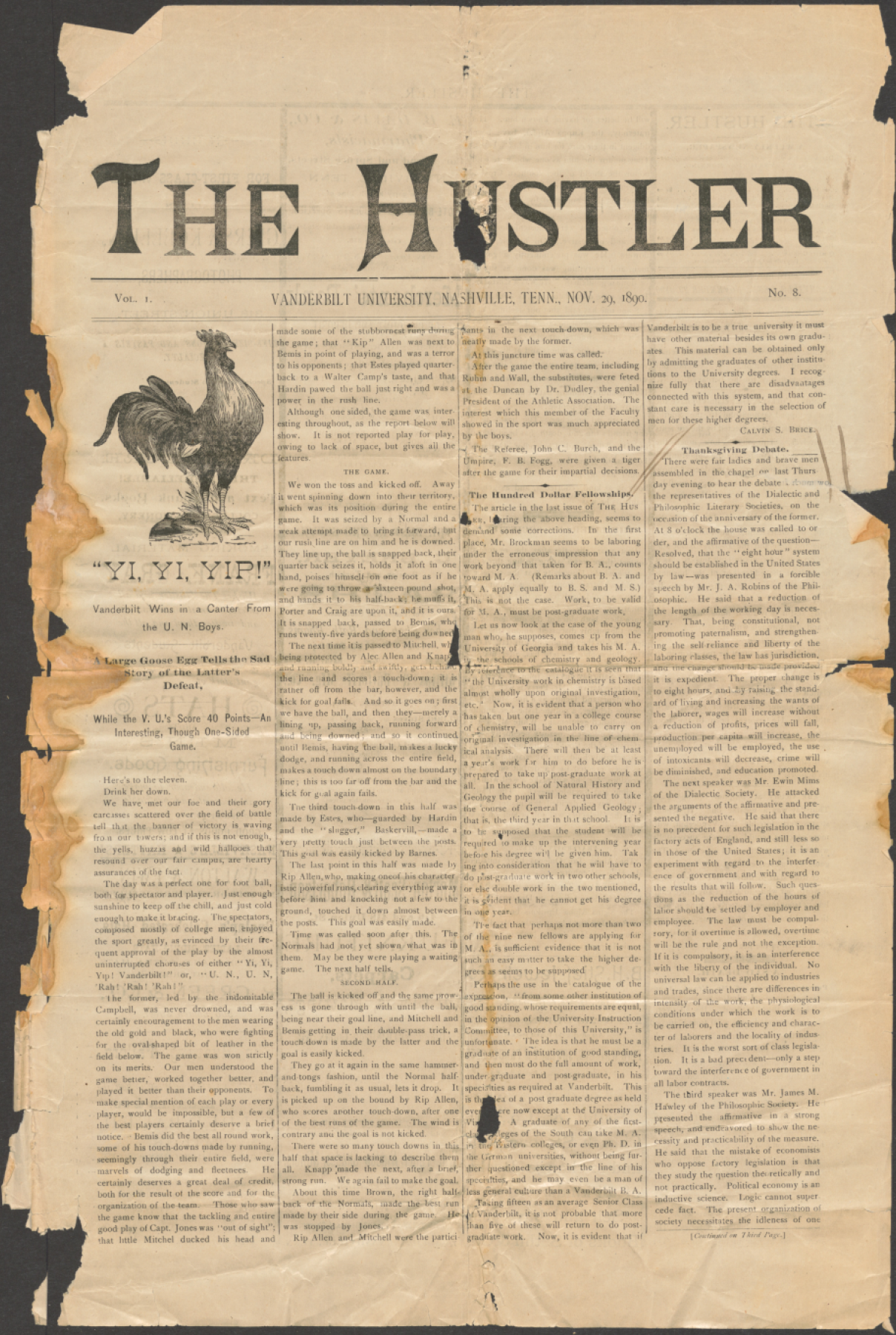
Earliest surviving issue of The Hustler, dated November 29, 1890

The Hustler was established in the fall of 1888 to report on campus events, competing with the earlier school newspaper, The Observer. Initially published by the Calumet Club from 1888 to 1898 and then by the Vanderbilt Athletic Association from 1889 to 1917, The Hustler has been student-run since 1917, under the guidance of a publication board now called Vanderbilt Student Communications, Inc. Due to fires and vandalism, the earliest surviving issue of The Hustler is a single issue from 1890, recently donated to the Special Collections and University Archives by an alumnus' family.

The Hustler was published weekly until 1967, when it increased its frequency to twice weekly in 1968. By the 1990s, it reverted to a weekly publication. From 2007 to 2016, the newspaper was available both electronically and in print. In 2016, The Hustler transitioned to an entirely digital format.

In 2020, the Vanderbilt Hustler first reported that Sarah Fuller practiced with the Vanderbilt football program. Fuller became the first woman to play in a Power Five football game.

== Notable alumni ==
In the 1960s, Lamar Alexander served as its editor, and called for open admission of African Americans on campus. More recently, Willie Geist was the editor.

== Past issues ==
Past issues, going back to 1890, can be read online on JSTOR.
