= Michael Holley =

American journalist

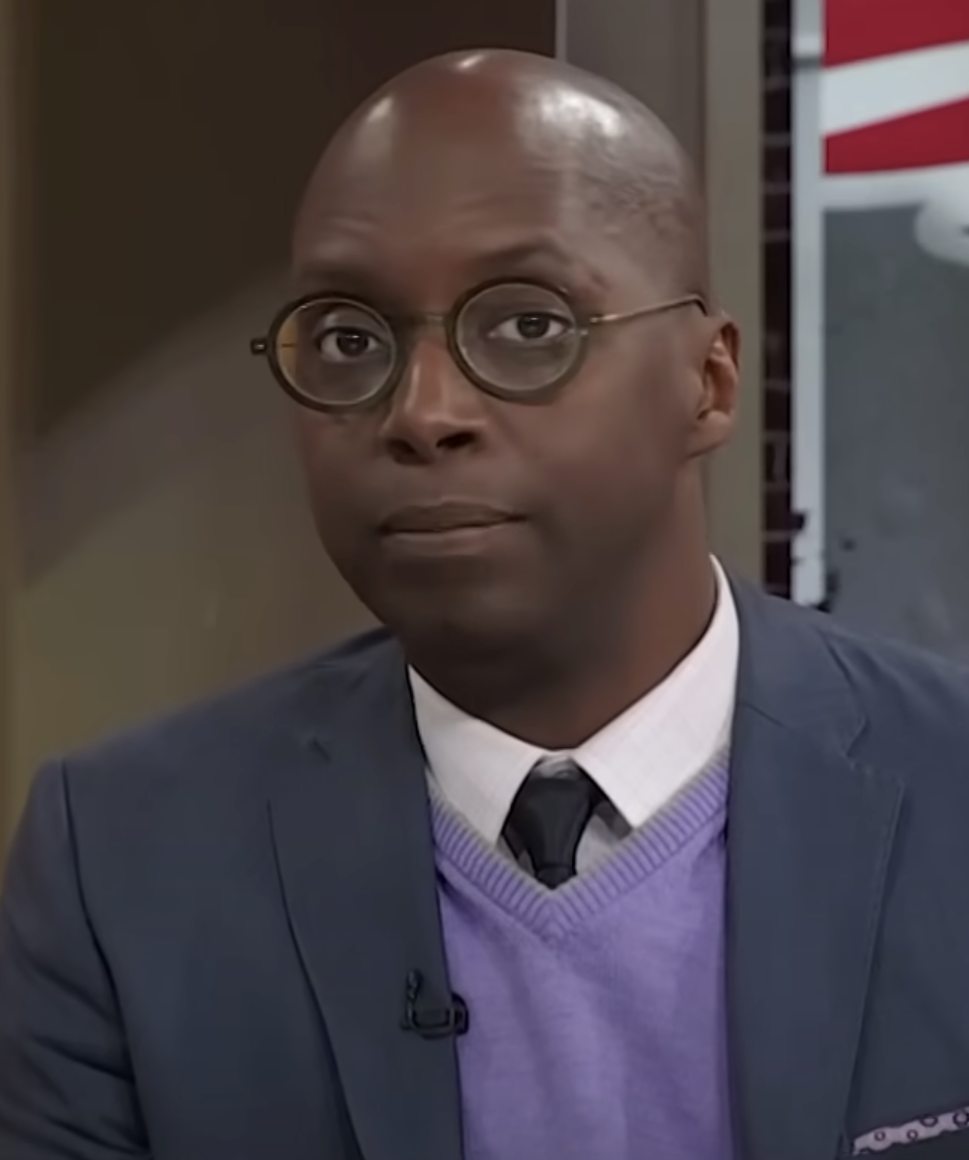
- Holley in 2024
- Born: Michael S. Holley; February 26, 1970 (age 56)
- Education: Point Park University
- Children: Robinson Coltrane (b. 2008); Beckham Ellison (b. 2010); Ava August (b. 2012)

Michael S. Holley (born February 26, 1970) is an American television and radio sports commentator, sports reporter, author and a professor at Boston University. He formerly wrote columns for the Boston Globe, Chicago Tribune, The Plain Dealer, and Akron Beacon Journal.

== Career ==
While working for the Akron Beacon Journal in 1993, Holley was one of several reporters who worked on a project studying race relations in Northeastern Ohio. The series, entitled "A Question of Color," won the 1994 Pulitzer Prize for Meritorious Public Service.

Holley worked as a reporter and columnist for the Boston Globe from 1997-2001 and then again from 2002-2005, briefly leaving the paper to work for the Chicago Tribune.

In 2005, Holley left the Globe to replace Bob Neumeier as co-host of the WEEI midday sports radio talk show. The show was renamed the Dale & Holley Show and featured Holley and former Boston Bruins play-by-play announcer Dale Arnold who discussed the various Boston sports teams.

On February 15, 2011, it was announced Holley would join Glenn Ordway as co-host of the afternoon drive WEEI program The Big Show. Mike Salk replaced Glenn Ordway as host of The Big Show and the show was renamed Salk and Holley on March 20, 2013. Mike Salk left the station on March 12, 2014, ending Salk and Holley. On April 1, 2014 WEEI-FM relaunched the Dale and Holley show with his former co-host Dale Arnold from 2-6 PM.

On February 28, 2018, Holley announced at the 5 p.m. hour that he would be leaving WEEI immediately after the show to pursue a full time television role with NBC Sports Boston. It was a very emotional decision for Holley after spending 13 years with the station and 10 of those with his radio partner and friend on and off the air, Dale Arnold.

In October 2008, Holley replaced Donny Marshall as host of Celtics Now, a weekly program on Comcast SportsNet that covers on and off court stories related to the Boston Celtics.

Holley is currently an Associate Professor of Practice Journalism at Boston University.

Holley is the author of seven books, three of which have made made the New York Times Best Seller list. Patriot Reign: Bill Belichick, the Coaches, and the Players Who Built a Champion, made the New York Times Best Seller list for nonfiction.

Holley has appeared on the ESPN television program Around the Horn as well as I, Max on Fox Sports Net.

On September 14, 2020, Holley joined Peacock to co-host a new show with Michael Smith called Brother From Another from 3-5 ET.

== Personal life ==
Michael Holley was born in Akron, Ohio. He earned a Bachelor of Arts degree in Journalism from Point Park College in May 1992. On April 30, 2005, he gave the commencement speech to the class of 2005 at Point Park University, where he received an honorary Doctor of Humane Letters degree. Max Kellerman, graduate of Columbia University, often made verbal jabs at Point Park University while the two were featured on "I, Max."

Holley married on July 14, 2007.

== Books ==
- Patriot Reign: Bill Belichick, the Coaches, and the Players Who Built a Champion - ISBN 0060757957
- Never Give Up: My Stroke, My Recovery and My Return to the NFL with Tedy Bruschi - ISBN 047010869X
- Red Sox Rule: Terry Francona and Boston's Rise to Dominance - ISBN 0061458546
- War Room: The Legacy of Bill Belichick and the Art of Building the Perfect Team - ISBN 0062082396
- Belichick and Brady: Two Men, the Patriots, and How They Revolutionized Football - ISBN 978-0316266918
- The Big Three: Paul Pierce, Kevin Garnett, Ray Allen, and the Rebirth of the Boston Celtics - ISBN 978-0316489942
- Heart And Steel/Bill Cowher ISBN 978-1982175795

Preceded by Jackie MacMullan	Boston Globe Celtics beat writer 1995-1997 (interim)	Succeeded by Shira Springer
