= Scarborough Country =

- Presented by: Joe Scarborough
- Country of origin: United States
- Original language: English

Production
- Running time: 60 minutes

Original release
- Network: MSNBC
- Release: April 2003 – June 2007

Related
- Verdict with Dan Abrams; Morning Joe

Scarborough Country was an opinion/analysis show broadcast on MSNBC Monday to Thursday at 9 P.M. ET. It was hosted by former congressman Joe Scarborough.

Scarborough Country made its debut in April 2003. On average, Scarborough Country received approximately 300,000 viewers per night (Source: Nielsen Media Research). Frequent on-air contributors to Scarborough Country were Craig Crawford, Pat Buchanan, Brent Bozell, and Tony Perkins.

While remaining "extraordinarily conservative", Scarborough became more critical of President George W. Bush and some of his policies before the show ended in 2007. Scarborough more frequently agreed with traditional conservative Pat Buchanan, who appeared on Scarborough's show nearly every day. Scarborough Country was replaced with Live with Dan Abrams in 2007 when Scarborough left to host Morning Joe.

== Tabloid turn ==
In the summer of 2006, Scarborough Country was criticized for taking a "tabloid turn", covering mainly celebrity, entertainment, and crime stories. The show featured segments such as "Must See SC," and "Hollyweird" about celebrities in trouble. The show covered the August 2006 Mel Gibson DUI arrest extensively. The show also devoted much time to segments about The View, Lindsay Lohan, Britney Spears's baby, Tom Cruise's baby, and other tabloid stories. The segment was also known for sometimes reairing a regular skit from ABC's Jimmy Kimmel Live!, "This Week In Unnecessary Censorship".

== Scarborough Unplugged ==
Former MSNBC General Manager Dan Abrams started a segment called "Scarborough Unplugged," which featured Joe Scarborough engaging in humorous acts. These segments are fictionalized. One included an audition tape for Dancing with the Stars. Another included Scarborough's destroying Laura Ingraham video tapes. One made fun of MSNBC's Dan Abrams, and another one featured Scarborough's swearing at reporters over a celebrity list.
