= Suburban Trib =

US newspaper

The Suburban Trib was a three-day-a-week newspaper, albeit with its own staff and policies, inserted into suburban issues of the Chicago Tribune. The Suburban Trib operated from 1967 until it was discontinued in 1985 in favor of regional editions of the Chicago Tribune.
