= WPWC =

Radio station in Dumfries-Triangle, Virginia

- Dumfries-Triangle, Virginia; United States
- Broadcast area: Southern Prince William County, Virginia; Western Charles County, Maryland
- Frequency: 1480 kHz
- Branding: Brava 1480

Programming
- Format: Regional Mexican

Ownership
- Owner: WASP Productions; (Amin Segundo)

History
- First air date: 1961
- Former call signs: WQVA (1962–1974)
- Former frequencies: 1530 kHz (1962–1979)
- Call sign meaning: Prince William County

Technical information
- Licensing authority: FCC
- Facility ID: 25995
- Class: B
- Power: 5,000 watts (day); 500 watts (night)
- Transmitter coordinates: 38°34′6.0″N 77°20′20.0″W

Links
- Public license information: Public file; LMS

WPWC is a Regional Mexican formatted broadcast radio station licensed to Dumfries-Triangle, Virginia, serving Southern Prince William County, Virginia and Western Charles County, Maryland. WPWC is owned by Amin Segundo's WASP Productions.

== History ==
WPWC signed on in 1961 as WQVA, a 250-watt daytimer broadcasting on 1530 kHz and licensed to Quantico, Virginia. WQVA was first owned by Harold Hersch, W.T. Merchant, and H. Ewing Wall's Radio One Company, later WQVA, Inc. It was sold to Raymond W. Woolfenden's Happy Broadcasting Company in 1974, changing to its current call sign at the same time. A move to the current 1480 kHz occurred in 1979 along with a power upgrade. WPWC ran a country format from 1974 through 2000. That year, Woolfenden sold the station to JMK Communications of Los Angeles, California.

From January 2012 through 2016, WPWC gained notoriety by running a progressive talk format known as We Act Radio. WPWC features "Take Action News with David Shuster" produced live from We Act Radio's studios in the Anacostia neighborhood of Southeast, Washington, D.C.

On May 6, 2012, WPWC added The Union Edge, "Labor's Talk Radio," to their line up.

On September 16, 2012, WPWC started producing "Pivot Point with Maya Rockeymoore," a live public affairs radio show dedicated to aging issues and their intersection with politics, public policy, and popular culture.

On February 20, 2013, We Act Radio started producing the Rock Newman Show from their Anacostia studio.

Two of WPWC's four towers collapsed on October 21, 2016, causing $140,000 in damage. At the time, it had dropped the progressive talk format and was broadcasting a Spanish-language Christian format under the name "Radio Sion". We Act Radio continues as an Internet stream.

On October 10, 2023, WPWC started broadcasting Tropical/Urban music as "Brava 1480".
