= David Gregory (journalist) =

American television journalist and presenter (born 1970)

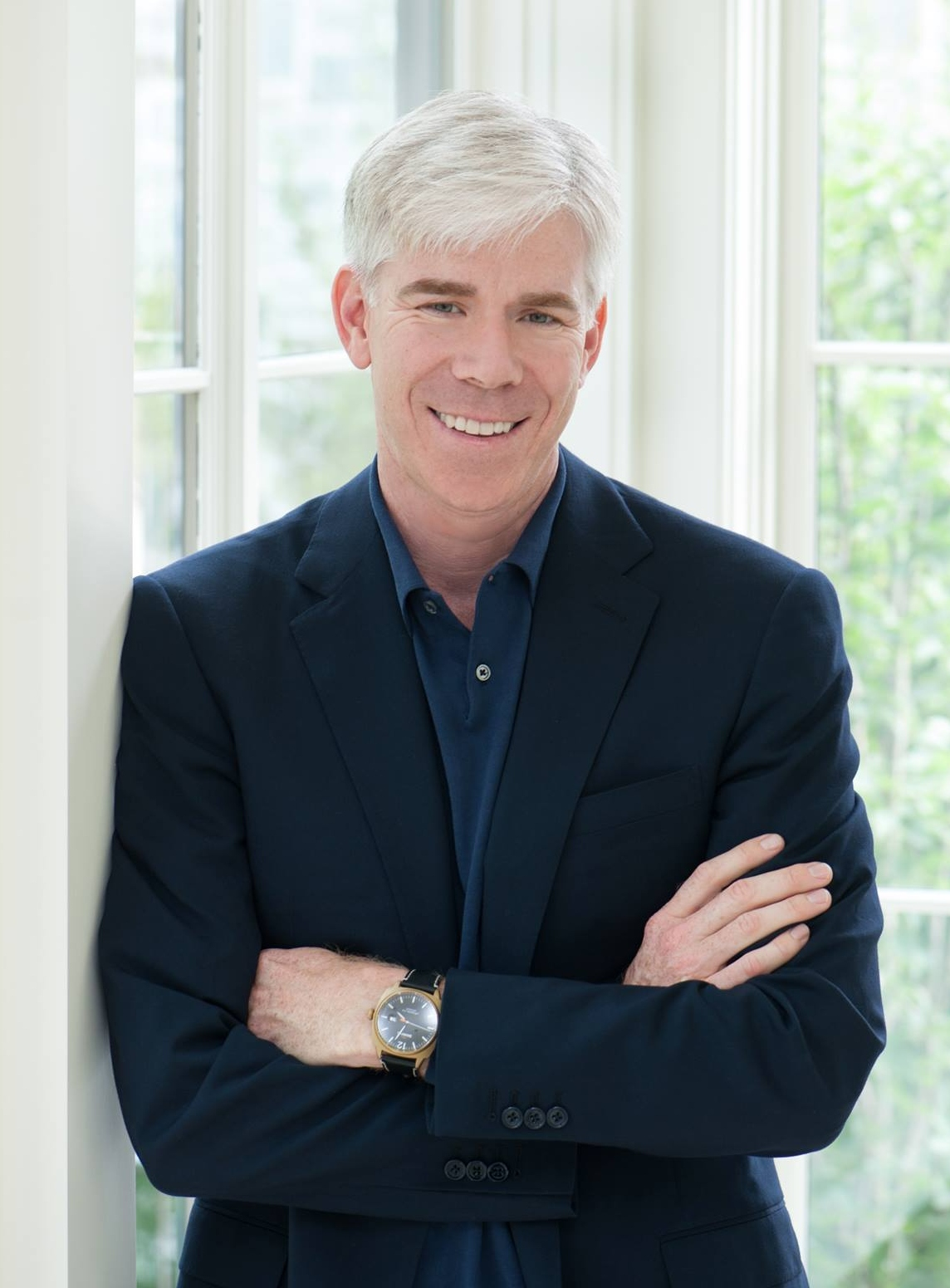
- Gregory at his home in Washington, D.C.
- Born: David Michael Gregory; August 24, 1970 (age 56); Los Angeles, California, U.S.
- Education: American University (BA)
- Occupation: Television host
- Notable credit(s): Meet the Press (2008–2014); NBC News Chief White House Correspondent (2001–2008)
- Spouse: Beth Wilkinson (m. 2000)
- Children: 3
- Parent(s): Carolyn Fitzpatrick Gregory; Don Gregory

David Michael Gregory (born August 24, 1970) is an American television personality and the former host of NBC News' Sunday morning talk show Meet the Press. Gregory has served as a CNN political analyst since 2016.

== Early life and education ==
Gregory was born in Tarzana, Los Angeles, California, and raised in Encino and Van Nuys, the son of Carolyn (née Fitzpatrick), an account manager, and Don Gregory (originally Don Ginsburg), a film and theatrical producer. His father was Jewish and his mother was Irish Catholic.

Gregory was educated at Birmingham High School, a co-educational public high school in the Lake Balboa district of Los Angeles, followed by American University in Washington, D.C., from which he graduated in 1992. While there, he worked for the campus television station, ATV - American University Television, and received a degree in international studies from the School of International Service. He was also a member of the Alpha Sigma Phi fraternity. Gregory was named the School of International Service's alumnus of the year in 2005 and sits on the Dean's Advisory Council.

== Career ==
=== Early career ===
Gregory began his career at the age of 18 as a summer reporter for KGUN-TV in Tucson, Arizona. Gregory also worked for NBC's Sacramento, California, affiliate KCRA-TV.

=== Relationship with the Bush White House ===
Gregory was assigned by NBC to the press corps covering George W. Bush when he ran for president in 2000. During the campaign, Bush threw a party for Gregory's 30th birthday, complete with cake, on the campaign plane. Bush nicknamed Gregory "Stretch" because of his height (6'5"), and also "Dancing Man," for Gregory's occasional propensity to display his dance moves.

After the election, Gregory became a White House correspondent for NBC. The conservative Media Research Center named him 'Best White House Correspondent' for his coverage of Bush's first 100 days. Gregory held this position until taking the Meet the Press job in December 2008.

Michael Chertoff, a Bush appointee, attended a baby shower for Gregory's children.

He also participated with Karl Rove, Bush's chief advisor, in a dancing skit for the Radio and Television Correspondents' Association Dinner in Washington, D.C.

=== Today ===
Gregory had been the substitute co-anchor at Weekend Today for Lester Holt from 2003 to 2014. He filled in for Matt Lauer on Today from 2005 to 2014. Gregory had anchored News Chat, Crosstalk NBC and Newsfront on MSNBC from 1998 to 2000.

=== NBC Nightly News ===
Gregory also filled in on NBC News Weekend Nightly News and NBC Nightly News from 2005 to 2014.

=== Imus in the Morning ===
Gregory also filled the Imus in the Morning time slot on MSNBC after the Don Imus controversy involving the Rutgers University basketball team while MSNBC searched for a permanent host. He served as a guest host in the morning time slot for MSNBC (while also being simulcast on WFAN) for one week in May. The morning radio program was known as Gregory Live.

=== Race for the White House and 1600 Pennsylvania Avenue ===
From March 17, 2008, through December 5, 2008, Gregory hosted a show on MSNBC weekday evenings, which replaced Tucker Carlson's Tucker. The show was called Race for the White House until the conclusion of the 2008 U.S. presidential election. From November 5, 2008, forward the show became known as 1600 Pennsylvania Avenue. Gregory was replaced by David Shuster, who was named as the new host for 1600 Pennsylvania Avenue starting with the December 15, 2008 show.

=== MSNBC anchor for election coverage in 2008 ===
Due to internal fighting among the staff at MSNBC, Gregory was appointed as anchor on MSNBC during the presidential debates and the 2008 election. On November 4–5, he teamed with Rachel Maddow, Eugene Robinson, Chris Matthews and Keith Olbermann as commentators on the presidential election.

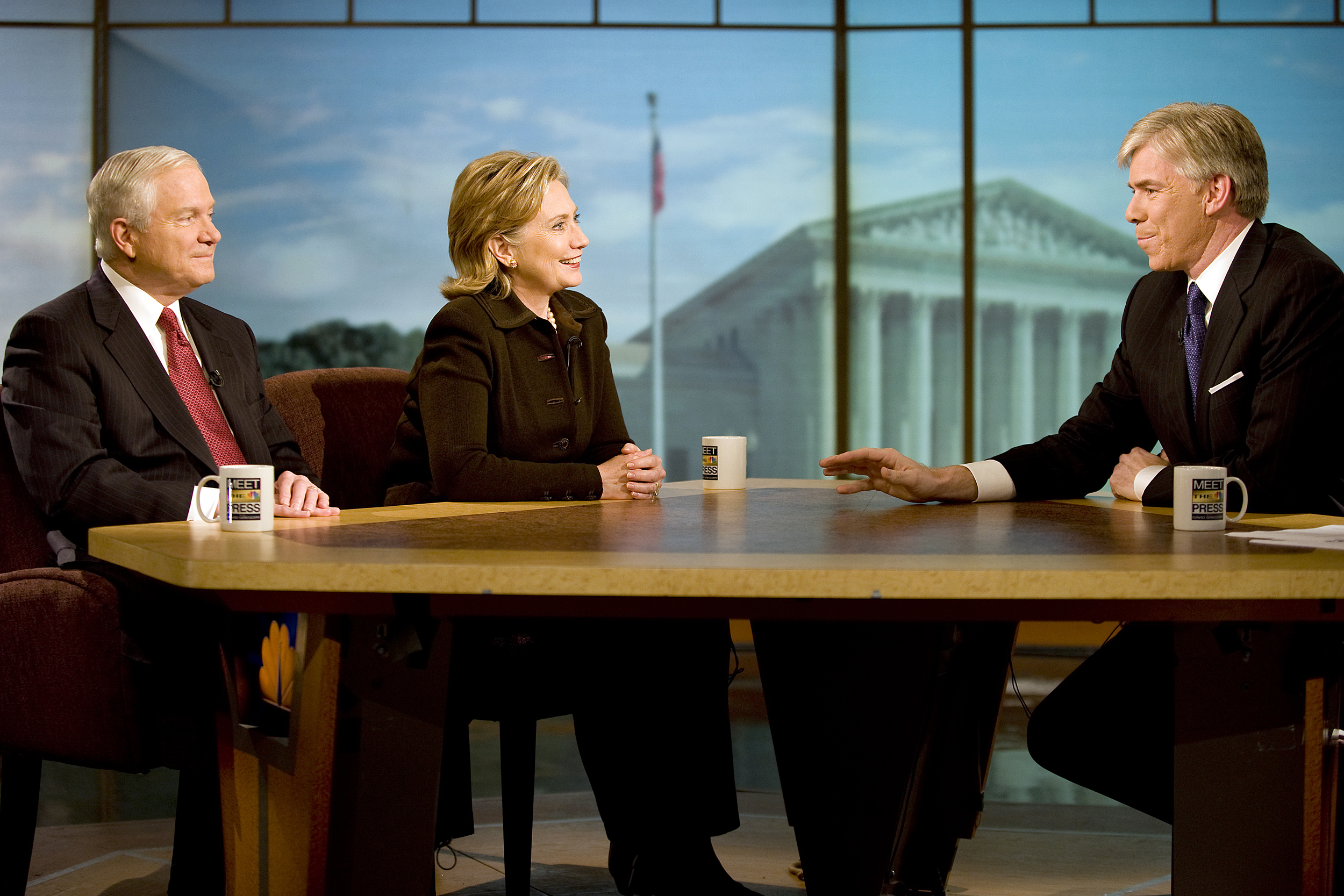
Gregory interviews Secretary of State Hillary Clinton and Defense Secretary Robert Gates in 2009

=== Meet the Press ===
Gregory became the moderator of Meet the Press, beginning with the December 14, 2008, episode when he was introduced by interim moderator Tom Brokaw. The ratings fell, and he was replaced in 2014.

During Gregory's tenure at Meet the Press, the show's ratings fell to their lowest in 21 years and it regularly placed third among Sunday morning news shows. The Washington Post reported that NBC hired a "psychological consultant" to assess Mr. Gregory. NBC did not deny this, saying it had hired a "brand consultant" to evaluate how Gregory connected with the audience. On August 14, 2014, NBC announced Gregory would leave the parent network, with his hosting duties assumed by Chuck Todd. On August 17, 2014, Andrea Mitchell hosted Meet the Press, and paid brief tribute to Gregory's career at NBC, saying, "In 20 years with NBC News, David has done it all.... Through all the years, David has been true to the traditions of this program and NBC News."

=== CNN ===
Gregory was hired by CNN as a political commentator for the 2016 U.S. presidential election season.

== Controversy ==
=== Press secretary conflicts ===
Gregory's interaction with Bush's press secretaries was contentious at times, garnering media attention in several instances. Numerous right wing commentators have used these incidents to characterize Gregory's reportage as proof of the news media's left-wing bias. Gregory has told Howard Kurtz that "it's easy to divert attention against a familiar whipping boy" and that "I provide fodder for critics who say, 'Aha, they're out of control.'"

On January 23, 2009, The Daily Beast columnist Ana Marie Cox stated that Barack Obama still has not discovered "this administration's David Gregory." She used Gregory as a metaphor for a White House foil, and she described this as a figure that could be interpreted as either "tough, news-oriented, and no-nonsense or showy, superficial, and self-indulgent."

=== High-capacity magazine display ===
On the December 23, 2012 broadcast of Meet the Press with National Rifle Association of America (NRA) chief executive Wayne LaPierre, Gregory displayed what he identified as "a magazine for ammunition that carries 30 bullets." NBC had requested permission from the Metropolitan Police Department (MPD) to include a high-capacity magazine in the segment and were denied. Gregory displayed the magazine on the show, with media reports noting D.C. Code 7-2506.01(b) prohibits the possession of magazines with a capacity in excess of "10 rounds of ammunition."

On December 26, 2012, MPD spokesmen confirmed the launch of an inquiry. When asked by CNN on December 27, 2012, if he thought Gregory should be prosecuted, NRA president David Keene responded, "No, I don't think so... I really think what David Gregory did while he was inadvertently flouting the law was illustrating in a very graphic way, perhaps not intentionally, but in a graphic way just how silly some of these laws are." Other gun rights advocates argued that not charging Gregory would show D.C. police to be hypocritical in enforcing gun laws.

On January 8, 2013, a spokeswoman for D.C. police chief Cathy L. Lanier said her department had completed its investigation into the matter and referred it to the office of the District's attorney general to determine if Gregory would be prosecuted. D.C. attorney general Irvin B. Nathan announced three days later that although Gregory had violated the law, no charges would be filed against him or any other NBC employees. Stating, "despite the clarity of the violation of this important law, because under all of the circumstances here a prosecution would not promote public safety in the District of Columbia nor serve the best interests of the people of the District to whom this office owes its trust."

=== Glenn Greenwald and Edward Snowden ===
On June 23, 2013, David Gregory posed a question to journalist Glenn Greenwald that The Washington Post described as a "gotcha inquiry" containing "a veiled accusation of federal criminal wrongdoing, very much in the tradition of 'how long have you been beating your wife'". According to the Los Angeles Times, "Gregory's question disguised a loaded assumption" that Greenwald aided and abetted NSA leaker Edward Snowden before asking: "[W]hy shouldn't you, Mr. Greenwald, be charged with a crime?" Greenwald responded vigorously in objection to the question. The accusation itself became a news story. The New York Times said, "If you tease apart his inquiry, it suggests there might be something criminal in reporting out important information from a controversial source." The Poynter Institute wrote, "The obvious defense is that he was merely asking a question that evinced a viewpoint advanced by U.S. Rep. Peter King and Washington Post columnist Marc Thiessen—that publishing secrets is law-breaking." Opinion columnist Frank Rich called Gregory's charges "preposterous," questioning Gregory's own journalistic credentials and asking why he didn't also make similar accusations against Washington Post reporter Barton Gellman, who also published Snowden's leaks.

== Personal life ==
Since June 2000, Gregory has been married to Beth Wilkinson, a Methodist. Wilkinson is a former federal prosecutor, former Fannie Mae executive vice president, general counsel and corporate secretary, and a lawyer representing four of Hillary Clinton's closest aides in the FBI's investigation of Clinton's email scandal. They met while Gregory was covering the Oklahoma City bombing as a reporter and Wilkinson was serving as prosecutor on the case. They have three children.

In 2020, he and his wife donated $1.5 million to McLean School of Maryland for the establishment of the Athletics, Coaching, and Mentoring Program. This program delivers research-based and educational approaches through coaching.

By 2011, Gregory and his family had established a weekly Shabbat practice centered on Friday-night dinner, candle lighting, blessings and expressions of gratitude. He also met weekly with a Jewish scholar to study the Bible and Jewish religious practice.

Gregory wrote How's Your Faith?, a book about his spiritual journey with Judaism, being born to interfaith parents and his marriage to a Christian. It was released in September 2015.

Media offices
Preceded by Tom Brokaw	Meet the Press Moderator; December 14, 2008 – August 10, 2014	Succeeded by Chuck Todd
