= I, Max =

- Genre: Sport
- Directed by: Howard Lutt
- Presented by: Max Kellerman; Michael Holley
- Country of origin: United States
- Original language: English

Production
- Editor: Brian LaTerra

Original release
- Network: Fox Sports Net
- Release: May 10, 2004 – February 18, 2005

I, Max was a sports commentary show featuring host Max Kellerman and Michael Holley that aired nightly on Fox Sports Net. The concept of the show involved Kellerman and his ego (explaining the name of the show) against the world, represented by Holley, broadcasting via satellite from Boston, with producer Bill Wolff, the former "Disembodied Voice" from Around the Horn, appearing live from NYC as the "impartial" mediator.

On January 18, 2018 on his daily sports radio show in Boston on WEEI 93.7 the "Dale & Holley" show Michael Holley said Woody Paige was the first choice to join Kellerman but Paige declined the offer and the role was offered to Holley.

== Format ==
Each show opened with Kellerman relaying three bits of information he has heard/been told of. He always concluded by saying, "but I, Max, say wrong, wrong, wrong" and would add a pithy comment afterward.

The show was divided into segments, with topics in each segment being scored as "rounds" (not unlike boxing, which Max has a background in as an analyst for HBO and previously ESPN2). The show was originally scored on a 10-point scale system like a boxing match, with the loser of the round scoring 9 in most cases (8 or less if Wolff determined the argument to be weak enough to warrant it). This later was changed to the winner of the argument getting credit for winning the round. Originally a 15-round format, the show later reduced the rounds to 12.

Late in the show's run, the format changed. The first round would still feature the same debate between Holley and Max, but they were no longer scored. The next two segments usually consisted of Kellerman conducting interviews, although there was an occasional second segment game from the previous format that Holley would participate in (otherwise, his time on the show ended after the first segment). The final segment saw Bill Wolff make his first appearance of the show and again saw Max answer emails from viewers, with Wolff arbitrarily deciding after the segment was over whether Kellerman would receive love or hate mail.

== Cancellation ==
The show was the most popular show on Fox Sports Net, though many people thought the show to be too similar in style to Max's former show, Around the Horn. Despite the high ratings, the last episode of I, Max aired on February 18, 2005, nine months after it debuted. Max Kellerman, on the other hand, has an explanation for the demise of I, Max. According to statements made by Kellerman frequently on his radio show, the show was the highest-rated show on Fox Sports. The cancellation of I, Max, according to Kellerman, was due to his not agreeing to making changes to the show's format that he viewed would damage the show. He also took time away from sports television media just beforehand and after the cancellation due to grief over his brother's October 2004 death from a homicide, which former boxer James Butler was convicted for carrying out.
