= 1600 Pennsylvania Avenue (TV program) =

- Presented by: David Shuster; David Gregory
- Country of origin: United States
- Original language: English

Production
- Running time: 60 minutes

Original release
- Network: MSNBC
- Release: March 17, 2008 – April 3, 2009

1600 Pennsylvania Avenue is an MSNBC television program hosted by David Shuster that ended in 2009. The show is a panel discussion of news and trends in American politics among the panelists and anchor. It is a continuation of the show Race for the White House, which was originally hosted by David Gregory and aired in the same time slot from March to November 2008. Shuster became the host of the show when Gregory became moderator of NBC's Meet the Press.

The show had a rotating array of panelists, but Eugene Robinson, Michael Smerconish, Richard Wolffe, and Pat Buchanan had appeared on a frequent basis.

Race for the White House and 1600 Pennsylvania Avenue aired nightly at 6 PM Eastern on MSNBC.

== Race for the White House (2008) ==
The show began airing on March 17, 2008, as Race for the White House with a focus on the 2008 Presidential election campaign. Race for the White House was simulcast on Air America Radio (whose regular 6 PM host, Rachel Maddow, is a panelist on the show).

During Democrats and Republican Convention weeks, Gregory hosted convention coverage broadcasting from Denver (DNC, week of August 27) and Saint Paul (RNC, week of September 1). Gregory, notable person and regular panelists discussed at MSNBC's outdoor studio at both convention sites.

After the convention coverage, the program format shifted to incorporate Gregory's one-on-one (or -two) interview style.

=== Panel titles ===
- 3 Questions
- The Headline – panelists comment on the day's political news.
- Inside the War Room
- Play with Panel – panel discusses a viewer's question.
- Panel Prediction – analysis of Democratic primary race (Clinton/Obama) and presidential election race (McCain/Obama).

=== Regular panelists ===
- Pat Buchanan – MSNBC political analyst
- Harold Ford Jr. – former U.S. Congressman (D-Tenn.), MSNBC political analyst
- Rachel Maddow – Air America Radio talk show host
- Eugene Robinson – The Washington Post columnist
- Joe Scarborough – host of MSNBC's Morning Joe, former U.S. Congressman (R-Fla.)
- Michael Smerconish – Philadelphia radio talk show host
- Chuck Todd – NBC News political director (now NBC News' anchor of Meet The Press)

== 1600 Pennsylvania Avenue (2008–2009) ==
On November 5, 2008, the day after the election, the show was renamed 1600 Pennsylvania Avenue.

On December 7, 2008, Gregory was named as the new permanent moderator of NBC's Meet the Press, effective the following Sunday, December 14. 1600 was being hosted by David Shuster on a temporary basis until the naming of a new permanent host. On December 12, 2008, David Shuster was named the official anchor of 1600 Pennsylvania Avenue, effective immediately.

On April 2, 2009, in the show's final segment, David Shuster announced that he had been given a new assignment and that he was going on to co-anchor a new show with Tamron Hall, airing 3–5 PM Eastern time beginning on June 1. As of Monday, April 6, 2009, a new show titled The Ed Show hosted by radio host Ed Schultz took over the 6 PM Eastern time slot. The final edition of 1600 (on April 3) was hosted by Mike Barnicle, a regular MSNBC substitute anchor.

=== Segments ===
- The Headline – what each panelist sees as the top story of the day
- The Briefing Room – recapping political headlines, as well as odd stories in the political realm, and beyond
- The Grill – David Shuster interviews a newsmaker one-on-one
- Hypocrisy Watch – Shuster usually points out whenever a person, usually a politician, makes a statement that goes against the previous beliefs of that person; Shuster ends the segment with the tagline, "That's hypocrisy... and it's wrong."
- Muckraker of the Day – Highlighting one journalist or "muckraker" involved with a story that made a big impact on that day

=== Substitute hosts ===
- Mika Brzezinski
- Ed Schultz
- Mike Barnicle
