= List of past ESPN personalities =

== Analysts ==
- Bill Adam: (auto racing coverage)
- Trev Alberts: College Game Day
- James Allen: (Formula One coverage)
- Greg Anthony: 2002–2008 (NBA Shootaround and game coverage analyst); now NBA TV analyst
- Teddy Atlas – boxing analyst and trainer
- Pete Axthelm: (NFL GameDay and NFL PrimeTime analyst) (deceased)
- Dusty Baker: 2006–2007 (Baseball Tonight analyst)
- Stephen Bardo: 2005–2013 College Basketball on ESPN
- Jon Beekhuis: (auto racing coverage)
- Dick Berggren: (auto racing coverage)
- Chauncey Billups: 2014–2021 (NBA Countdown and The Jump)
- Todd Blackledge: 2006–2022 (ESPN College Football Saturday Primetime)
- Brian Boucher: 2021-2023 (NHL on ESPN)
- Larry Bowa: 2005 (Baseball Tonight analyst); now Philadelphia Phillies bench coach
- Scotty Bowman: 2000s (NHL on ESPN analyst)
- Timothy Bradley Jr.: boxing analyst
- Dallas Braden: 2014–2017 (Baseball Tonight analyst)
- Jeff Brantley: (Baseball Tonight and game coverage analyst); now broadcaster for Cincinnati Reds
- Tom Brennan: 2005–09 College Basketball on ESPN
- Chris Broussard (2004–2016): (NBA Fastbreak); now FS1 NBA analyst
- Hubie Brown: (2005–2025) NBA on ABC and NBA on ESPN
- Mack Brown (2015–2018): ESPN College Football
- Ric Bucher: NBA Fastbreak
- Ryan Callahan (2021–2025): (NHL on ESPN analyst)
- Rick Carlisle: 2007–2008 (NBA coverage analyst); now Indiana Pacers head coach
- Vince Carter: 2020–2023 (NBA Today and College GameDay)
- Chris Chelios: 2021–2023 (NHL on ESPN)
- Gil Clancy: boxing analyst and trainer
- Ryan Clark: 2015–2026 (Monday Night Countdown)
- John Clayton (1995–2017): Sunday NFL Countdown and NFL Live (deceased)
- Bill Clement: (ESPN National Hockey Night analyst) now retired
- Beano Cook: 1986–2012 College Game Day (deceased)
- Lee Corso (1987–2025): College GameDay (football) now retired
- Joe Cortez: rules analyst
- Catherine Crier: 2004 Thoroughbred Racing on ESPN analyst/reporter
- Bobby Czyz: boxing analyst
- Stacey Dales: 2002–2008 (men's and women's college basketball analyst) and sideline reporter for college football, college basketball, and the Little League World Series) Now on NFL Network
- Derek Daly: (auto racing coverage)
- John Davidson: (NHL analyst)
- Bob Davie: ESPN2 College Football Saturday Primetime
- Hubert Davis: 2005–13 College GameDay
- Dave Despain: (auto racing coverage)
- Rob Dibble: 1998–2004 (MLB coverage analyst; now with MLB Network Radio)
- Trent Dilfer (NFL Analyst)
- Chris Economaki: (auto racing coverage) (deceased)
- Herm Edwards: (NFL Live and ESPNU College Football)
- Brian Engblom: (NHL analyst and reporter)
- Peter Gammons: 1988–2009 (Baseball Tonight) now on MLB Network
- Mike Golic (1995–2020): Mike & Mike and Golic and Wingo
- Monica Gonzalez (2011–2016): (MLS on ESPN)
- Scott Goodyear: (2001–2018): IndyCar Series
- Mark Gottfried: College Basketball on ESPN
- Mike Gottfried: 1990–2007 Analyst and NCAA commentator
- Doug Gottlieb: 2003–2012 College Basketball on ESPN, now with CBS Sports
- Bob Griese: ESPN College Football
- Robert Griffin III: (2021–2024) (Monday Night Countdown Analyst and College Football Commentator)
- Matt Hasselbeck: (2016–2023) (Sunday NFL Countdown and Monday Night Countdown)
- Adrian Healey: 2003–2020 (MLS on ESPN)
- Orel Hershiser: 2000–2001 and 2006–2013: Wednesday Night Baseball and Sunday Night Baseball
- Merril Hoge: (1996–2017): NFL Live and NFL Matchup
- Lou Holtz: 2005–2015: ESPN College Football
- Brock Huard: ESPN College Football
- Mark Jackson: 2006 and 2014–2023 NBA on ESPN
- Craig James: College Football on ABC and ESPN College Football Thursday Primetime
- Dale Jarrett: 2008–2014 (NASCAR on ESPN), now analyst for NASCAR on NBC
- Ron Jaworski: (1990–2017) Monday Night Football and NFL Matchup
- Avery Johnson: 2008–2010 (NBA Shootaround), former Alabama coach
- Magic Johnson: 2008–2013 and 2016-2017 (NBA Countdown)
- Keyshawn Johnson 2006–2023 (Sunday NFL Countdown)
- Bob Knight: (2008–2015) College Basketball on ESPN (deceased)
- John Kruk: (2004–2016) Baseball Tonight
- Alexi Lalas: 2009–2014 (MLS on ESPN)
- Harold Lederman: rules analyst
- Bob Ley: 1979–2019 (MLS on ESPN)
- Ray Lewis 2014–2016: Sunday NFL Countdown and Monday Night Countdown
- Paul Maguire: 1998–2008 (college football coverage)
- Eric Mangini: 2011–2013 NFL Live
- Kyle Martino: 2008–2010 (MLS on ESPN)
- Mark May: ESPN College Football
- Todd McShay: ESPN College Football and NFL Draft scouting
- Barry Melrose (1995-2008, 2009–2023): NHL on ESPN
- Ray Mercer: guest analyst
- Matt Millen: 2009–2015 College Football on ABC and Monday Night Countdown
- Dominic Moore 2021–2024 (NHL on ESPN analyst)
- Joe Morgan: 1990–2010 Sunday Night Baseball (deceased)
- Chris Mortensen: Sunday NFL Countdown and Monday Night Countdown (deceased)
- Bob Myers (2023–2025): NBA on ESPN, NBA Countdown
- Eddie Olczyk: 2000s (NHL on ESPN)
- Sean O'Grady: boxing analyst
- Darren Pang: 1990s–2004 (NHL on ESPN)
- J.C. Pearson: ESPN College Football
- Andy Petree: 2007–2014 (NASCAR on ESPN), now analyst for Fox Sports
- Digger Phelps: 1993–2014 College Gameday and College GameNight
- Steve Phillips: 2005–2009 (Baseball Tonight and MLB coverage)
- Paul Pierce: 2017–2021 (NBA Countdown and The Jump)
- David Pollack: ESPNU College Football and College GameDay (football)
- Bill Raftery: 1980–2010 ESPN College Basketball; now with Fox Sports
- J.J. Redick: 2021–2024 First Take
- J.P. Ricciardi: Baseball Tonight
- Alex Rodriguez: 2018–2021: Sunday Night Baseball
- Jalen Rose: 2007–2023 NBA Countdown
- Sebastian Salazar: 2016–2025: (MLS on ESPN)
- John Saunders: (1992–2004) (NHL on ESPN)
- Mark Schlereth (2002–2017): NFL Live
- Curt Schilling (2010–2016): Baseball Tonight and Sunday Night Baseball
- Bart Scott: 2020–2026 (Get Up)
- Shannon Sharpe (2023–2025): First Take
- Paul Silas: NBA analyst (deceased)
- Chris Singleton (2008–2011): Major League Baseball on ESPN
- Chris Spielman: 2001–2016 ESPN College Football
- Manny Steward: boxing analyst and trainer
- Ernie Terrell: boxing analyst
- John Tortorella: (2021–2022): NHL on ESPN
- Gary Thorne: (1992–2004): NHL on ESPN
- Taylor Twellman: 2011–2023 (MLS on ESPN)
- Bobby Valentine: 2003, 2009–2011: Baseball Tonight and Sunday Night Baseball
- Jeff Van Gundy: 2007–2023 NBA on ESPN
- Adnan Virk: 2010–2019: Baseball Tonight, College Football Final and SportsCenter anchor
- Fernando Viña: Baseball Tonight
- Bill Walton (2002–2003, 2004–2005, 2007–2008): NBA on ESPN (deceased)
- Andre Ward: ringside analyst
- Micky Ward: boxing analyst
- Dave Winfield: Baseball Tonight
- Damien Woody: 2011–2026 (NFL Live)
- Matt Wynalda: 2003–2012 (MLS on ESPN)
- Eric Young: Baseball Tonight

== Anchors ==
- Jorge Andres: 2011–2015 (Sportscenter, ESPNews, NBA Tonight and Numbers Never Lie); now with CBS
- Thea Andrews: 2003–2006 (Cold Pizza (2003–2005), ESPN Hollywood (2005–2006); later co-anchor of The Insider
- Steve Berthiaume: 2000–2006, 2007–2012 (SportsCenter and Baseball Tonight); now play-by-play voice of Arizona Diamondbacks
- Michelle Bonner: 2005–2012 (SportsCenter, ESPNews and ESPN First Take)
- Ashley Brewer: 2020-2023 (SportsCenter and The Replay)
- Steve Bunin: 2003–2012 (SportsCenter and ESPNews)
- Eric Clemons: 1987-1991 (Sports Center, NBA Today and Heavyweight Boxing Coverage
- Jonathan Coachman: 2008–2017 (ESPNews and SportsCenter)
- Linda Cohn: 1992–2026 (SportsCenter, X Center, and In The Crease) retired
- Jay Crawford: 2003–2017 (co-host of Cold Pizza/ESPN First Take and 1st & 10)
- Lindsay Czarniak: 2011–2017 (SportsCenter)
- Neil Everett: 1999–2023 (SportsCenter)
- Robert Flores: 2005–2016 (SportsCenter, ESPNews); now with MLB Network
- Kevin Frazier: (SportsCenter anchor and NBA Shootaround host); now co-anchor of The Insider and host of The T.Ocho Show
- Gayle Gardner: 1982–1987 (SportsCenter anchor)
- George Grande: (first SportsCenter anchor; now with the Cincinnati Reds)
- Greg Gumbel: 1979–1988 (SportsCenter anchor and NBA play-by-play); later at CBS Sports (deceased)
- Brett Haber: (SportsCenter anchor); now WUSA (Washington, DC) sports anchor
- Mike Hall: 2004–2007 (ESPNU); now at Big Ten Network
- Chris Hassel: 2013–2017 (SportsCenter anchor)
- Darren M. Haynes: 2014–2017 (SportsCenter anchor)
- Fred Hickman: 2004–2008 (SportsCenter anchor and NBA Shootaround host) (deceased)
- Jemele Hill 2006–2018 (SportsCenter anchor); now with The Atlantic
- Mike Hill: 2004–2013 (ESPNews, Baseball Tonight & NFL Live); now with Fox Sports 1
- Kit Hoover: (Cold Pizza co-host and tennis reporter); now with Access Hollywood
- Jason Jackson: (SportsCenter anchor and NBA 2Night host)
- Dana Jacobson: 2002–2012 (co-host of Cold Pizza/ESPN First Take and 1st & 10; formerly SportsCenter); now with CBS Sports Network and CBS News
- Mark Jones: 1990–2026 (college basketball, women's basketball, American football coverage and NBA on ESPN)
- Max Kellerman – studio anchor and host
- Brian Kenny: 1997–2011 (SportsCenter, Friday Night Fights and Top 5 Reasons You Can't Blame); now with the MLB Network
- Lisa Kerney: 2014–2018 (Sportscenter anchor)
- Craig Kilborn: 1993–1996 (SportsCenter anchor)
- Michael Kim: 1995–2013 (ESPNews, Mike and Mike in the Morning, and ESPN First Take news anchor)
- Bob Ley: 1979–2019 (Outside the Lines and SportsCenter)
- Kenny Mayne: 1994–2021 (Sunday NFL Countdown, SportsCenter, and horse racing coverage)
- Sal Marchiano: 1981–1983 (Sportscenter anchor)
- Jade McCarthy: 2012–2017 (SportsCenter anchor, NFL Insiders host, and NFL Live host)
- Dan Patrick: 1989–2007 (SportsCenter anchor, ESPN Radio host, and NBA Countdown host); now NBC Sports host
- Bill Pidto: 1993–2008 (ESPNews); now with MSG Network
- Molly Qerim: 2006–2010, 2015-2025 (First Take)
- Karl Ravech: 1993–2026 (Baseball Tonight and SportsCenter)
- Tony Reali: 2000–2025 (Pardon the Interruption and host of Around the Horn)
- Betsy Ross: (SportsCenter anchor)
- Karie Ross
- John Saunders: 1986–2016 (host of The Sports Reporters; former host of NBA Shootaround) (deceased)
- Stuart Scott: 1993–2015 (SportsCenter, host of Monday Night Countdown, Teammates, Dream Job and Stump the Schwab) (deceased)
- Jaymee Sire: 2013–2017 (SportsCenter and ESPNews anchor)
- Prim Siripipat: 2011–2017 (ESPN Radio)
- Sage Steele: 2007–2023 (SportsCenter and First Take)
- Charley Steiner: 1988–2002 (SportsCenter anchor, MLB, ESPN2 College football play-by-play, and boxing host); now with Los Angeles Dodgers
- Mike Tirico: 1991–2016 (SportsCenter anchor and NBA commentator); now with NBC Sports for NBA and NFL
- Stan Verrett: 2000–2025 (SportsCenter anchor)
- Adnan Virk: 2010–2019 (Sportscenter anchor ESPN College Football host, and ESPN College Basketball host); now with MLB Network
- Sara Walsh: 2010–2017 (SportsCenter anchor, NFL Insiders host, NFL Live host, and Fantasy Football Now host)
- Steve Weissman: 2010–2015 (SportsCenter and ESPNews); now with NFL Network
- Marcellus Wiley: 2007–2018 (co-host of SportsNation)

== Commentators ==
- Ron Allen: International Polo 2005–2016
- J.A. Adande: 2007–2025(Around the Horn)
- Kevin Blackistone: 2003–2025 (Around the Horn)
- Joe Lowe: 1992 (Monster Truck Challenge).
- Michael Buffer: ring announcer and commentator
- Tim Cowlishaw: 2002–2025 (Around the Horn and NASCAR Now)
- Cliff Drysdale: 1979–2025 (commentator of Tennis on ESPN) now retired
- Roy Firestone: 1980–1994 (Sports Look, Up Close host and Sunday Night Football)
- Israel Gutierrez: 2008–2024(Around the Horn and First Take)
- Liz Hulette: 1993–1995 (ESPN SpeedWorld) (Deceased)
- Bomani Jones: 2014–2017 (Highly Questionable)
- Max Kellerman: 2002–2023 (co-host of SportsNation)
- Paul Lukas: Uni Watch columnist
- Jackie MacMullan: 2003–2021 (Around the Horn) now retired
- Cam Newton: 2024–2026 (First Take)
- Katie Nolan: 2017–2021 (Host of the Sports? with Katie Nolan podcast and Always Late with Katie Nolan)
- Woody Paige: 2002-2025 (Around the Horn, Cold Pizza and 1st and 10)
- Bill Plaschke: 2003–2025(Around the Horn)
- Bob Ryan: 1993–2025 (The Sports Reporters and Around the Horn)
- Jim Rome: 2003–2011 (Jim Rome Is Burning) now with CBS Sports Radio
- Howie Schwab: 1987–2013 (Stump the Schwab)
- Bill Simmons: 2001–2015 (ESPN.com and Grantland) now with HBO and The Ringer
- Tommy Smyth: 1993–2017 (Champions League and MLS coverage)
- Sarah Spain: 2010–2022 (Around the Horn)
- Charissa Thompson: 2012–2013 (Co-host of SportsNation), now with Fox Sports

== Play-by-play ==
- Joe Beninati: (NHL coverage play-by-play); currently Washington Capitals play-by-play on Monumental Sports Network
- Tim Brando: (College football play-by-play); currently with Fox Sports
- Kevin Corke: (SportsCenter anchor); currently White House Correspondent for Fox News Channel
- JP Dellacamera: 1986–2011 (MLS on ESPN)
- Jim Durham: 1992–2012 (NBA coverage) (Deceased)
- Jim Simpson: 1979–1988 (College football, basketball)
- Art Eckman: 1991-2011 (MotoWorld and ESPN SpeedWorld) (Deceased)
- Jack Edwards: (NHL coverage, World Cup, Little League World Series, and SportsCenter anchor); former Boston Bruins play-by-play on NESN
- Mike Emrick: (NHL play-by-play); former play-by-play on NBC and NHL on NBC Sports Network
- Dick Enberg: 2004–2011 (tennis coverage) (Deceased)
- Ron Franklin: 1987–2011 (college basketball and football coverage) (Deceased)
- Jon Gruden: 2009–2018 (Monday Night Football)
- Adrian Healey: 2003–2020 (MLS on ESPN)
- Jim Hendrick: early 1980s-mid 1990s (ESPN SpeedWorld) (Deceased)
- Alexi Lalas: 2009–2014 (MLS on ESPN)
- Kyle Martino: 2008–2010 (MLS on ESPN)
- Tom Mees 1980s–1996 (NHL on ESPN)
- Jon Miller: 1990–2010 (Sunday Night Baseball play-by-play) now with the San Francisco Giants
- Brent Musburger: 1990–2017 (college basketball and football, and NASCAR coverage; and formerly NBA coverage); now with VSiN
- Brad Nessler: 1992–2016 (college football and basketball coverage); now with CBS Sports
- Allen Bestwick: (2007–2014) NASCAR coverage (2014–2017) College Football coverage/IndyCar Series coverage
- Mike Patrick: 1982–2018 (college basketball, baseball, and American football coverage) (Deceased)
- Phil Schoen: 1996–1999 (MLS on ESPN)
- Mike Tirico: 1991–2016 (NBA on ESPN); now currently with NBC Sports for NBA and NFL
- Gary Thorne: 1988–2009 (play-by-play announcer for various events)
- Taylor Twellman: 2011–2023 (MLS on ESPN)
- Matt Vasgersian: 2018–2021: Sunday Night Baseball
- Pam Ward: 1996–2025 (college football and women's basketball coverage)
- Matt Wynalda: 2003–2012 (MLS on ESPN)
- Fred White
- Steve Young (2000–2023) Monday Night Football

== Reporters ==
- David Aldridge: (NBA Shootaround and game coverage reporter); now reporter for TNT and analyst for NBA TV
- Erin Andrews: 2004–2012 (college football, basketball and MLB coverage), now with Fox Sports
- Scott Douglass: 1989-1998 (Monster Truck shows of all kinds, pulling shows, whether it was on ESPN)
- Army Armstrong: 1987-1992 (Monster Truck shows of all types)
- Joe Lowe (Deceased): 1992 (Monster Truck Challenge)
- Charly Arnolt: 2018–2023 (First Take and SportsCenter)
- Jill Arrington: 2004 (Thursday night college football sideline reporter); now with Fox Sports Net
- Julie Stewart-Binks 2016–2017 (MLS on ESPN reporter)
- Jenn Brown: 2010–2013 (College GameDay football and basketball, College World Series and Little League World Series reporter, X Games reporter, ESPNU Road Trip host)
- Downtown Julie Brown: (NFL Prime reporter)
- Scott Burnside: ice hockey reporter
- Tina Dixon: 2001-2012 (college football coverage) works at NBC Sports
- Colleen Dominguez: 2004–2014 (SportsCenter reporter); now with Fox Sports 1
- Jeannine Edwards: 1995–2017 (primary horse racing reporter) (retired)
- Alex Flanagan: 1998–2006 (SportsCenter and college football reporter); now with NFL Network and Notre Dame Football on NBC
- Pedro Gomez: 2003–2021 (SportsCenter reporter) (deceased)
- Jim Gray: (NBA sideline reporter); now reporter for Sacramento Kings on NBC Sports California
- Todd Grisham: 2011–2016 (SportsCenter reporter, Friday Night Fights, MMA Live)
- Tony Gwynn: (MLB coverage) (deceased)
- Todd Harris: (IRL coverage)
- Kaylee Hartung: (college football and basketball coverage), now with NBC News
- David Hobbs: (auto racing coverage)
- Michael Irvin: 2003–2006 (Sunday NFL Countdown and Monday Night Countdown analyst); now an NFL Network analyst
- Ned Jarrett: (auto racing coverage)
- Bob Jenkins: (auto racing coverage) (deceased)
- Parker Johnstone: (auto racing coverage)
- Steve "Snapper" Jones: (NBA analyst) (deceased)
- Mike Joy: (auto racing coverage) (play-by-play) NASCAR on Fox and Speed and (play-by-play) MLB on Fox
- Eric Karros: 2005–2006 (Thursday Night Baseball analyst); now Fox analyst
- Adrian Karsten: (College Football sideline reporter) (deceased)
- Ray Knight: (Baseball Tonight analyst); now a Washington Nationals studio analyst on MASN
- Suzy Kolber: 1993–1996 and 1999–2023 (Monday Night Football and SportsCenter)
- Andrea Kremer: 1989–2006 (SportsCenter, NFL Countdown, Monday Night Countdown reporter); now reporter for NBC Sports and Real Sports
- Bill Laimbeer: 2004–2005 (NBA Shootaround)
- Matt Lauer: (Stanley Cup Final reporter)
- Lee Leonard: (first SportsCenter anchor) (deceased)
- Rush Limbaugh: (NFL Countdown); hosted The Rush Limbaugh Show (deceased)
- Mario Lopez: (ESPN Hollywood); now hosts Extra, MTV's Top Pop Group, and America's Best Dance Crew
- Mike Macfarlane: (Baseball Tonight analyst)
- Rick Majerus: 2004–2007 (College GameNight and college basketball coverage); (deceased)
- Mark Malone: (NFL Matchup and NFL Live host)
- Dave Marash: (Baseball Tonight host)
- Buck Martinez: 2003–2007 (MLB coverage); now Toronto Blue Jays play-by-play on SportsNet and TBS analyst
- Tino Martinez: (Baseball Tonight analyst); now on YES Network
- Tim McCormick: (college basketball coverage)
- Tom Mees: 1979–1996 (SportsCenter, NHL coverage); (deceased)
- Gary Miller: 1990–2004 (SportsCenter anchor and MLB game play-by-play and reporter, and Baseball Tonight host)
- Anne Montgomery: (SportsCenter, aka Sports Recap)
- Al Morganti (1993–2005): (NHL coverage)
- Chris Mortensen: 1991–2023 (NFL Live and Sunday NFL Countdown)
- Chris Myers: (SportsCenter anchor, UpClose and Baseball Tonight host); now reporter for Fox Sports NASCAR on Fox pre-race host
- Rachel Nichols: 2004 and 2016-2021 (SportsCenter and E:60 reporter); now with Showtime Sports
- Wendi Nix: 2006–2023 (SportsCenter reporter, college football coverage)
- Katie Nolan: 2017–2021 (Sports? with Katie Nolan podcast)
- Larry Nuber: (auto racing coverage); (deceased)
- Keith Olbermann: 1992–1997 (SportsCenter anchor); was original host program with Olbermann on ESPN2 & ESPNEWS
- Ed Olczyk: (NHL coverage); now on NHL on TNT analyst
- Lou Palmer: (SportsCenter)
- Darren Pang: (NHL game and studio analyst, reporter); now analyst for the St. Louis Blues on Bally Sports Midwest
- Benny Parsons: (auto racing coverage) former NBC Sports and TNT analyst (deceased)
- Rick Peckham: (NHL coverage)
- Tom Pelissero: 2024–2026 (NFL Live, Get Up and SportsCenter)
- Sam Ponder: 2011–2024 (College GameDay, and Sunday NFL Countdown)
- Sam Posey: (auto racing coverage)
- Jerry Punch: 1984–2017 (NASCAR and college football coverage)
- Daryl Reaugh: (NHL coverage)
- Dave Revsine: 2002–2007 (College GameNight host and SportsCenter anchor); now with Big Ten Network
- Harold Reynolds: 1999–2006 (Baseball Tonight and college baseball coverage); now with MLB Network and Fox Sports
- Tom Rinaldi: 2003–2020 (SportsCenter reporter); now with Fox Sports
- Jimmy Roberts: (SportsCenter reporter); now NBC Sports reporter
- Robin Roberts: 1990–2005 (SportsCenter anchor and NFL PrimeTime co-host); now a co-anchor on Good Morning America
- Sam Rosen: (NHL coverage)
- Sam Ryan: (Sunday Night Baseball and NHL reporter); now with WABC-TV in New York City
- Lyn St. James: (auto racing coverage)
- Sean Salisbury: 1997–2008 (NFL Live); now hosts Inside Sports Unleashed and commentates for Lingerie Football League
- Dick Schaap: (The Sports Reporters host); (deceased)
- Bill Seward: (SportsCenter and Horse Racing)
- Sterling Sharpe: (Sunday NFL Countdown and Monday Night Countdown)
- Ralph Sheheen: (auto racing coverage)
- Neil Smith: (NHL coverage)
- Shannon Spake: 2007–2016 (NASCAR beat reporter and college basketball sideline reporter); now with TNT Sports
- Ken Squier: (auto racing coverage) (deceased)
- Walt Stannard: (F1 coverage 1987)
- Jayson Stark: 1999–2017 (Baseball Tonight)
- Melissa Stark: (Sunday NFL Countdown and SportsCenter reporter); now hosts First on the Field with NFL Network
- Michele Steele: 2011–2025 (SportsCenter reporter)
- Marc Stein: 2000–2017 (NBA Fastbreak); now publishes a newsletter
- Jackie Stewart: (Formula One coverage)
- Rob Stone: 1992–1995, 1997–2012 (Major League Soccer); now with Fox Sports
- Steve Stone (MLB coverage); now Chicago White Sox analyst for NBC Sports Chicago
- Dave Strader: (NHL and college basketball play-by-play); formerly with Dallas Stars (deceased)
- Michele Tafoya: 2000–2011 (Monday Night Football) former reporter on NBC Sunday Night Football
- Joe Theismann: 1987–2007 (NFL GameDay, Sunday Night Football, and Monday Night Football analyst)
- Tom Tolbert: 2002–2007 (NBA Shootaround and game coverage analyst)
- Bobby Unser: (auto racing coverage) (deceased)
- Bob Varsha: (auto racing coverage) now on Speed
- Lesley Visser: (ABC Sports and ESPN, 1994–2000, Monday Night Football 1997–99); now with CBS Sports
- Bill Weber: (auto racing coverage)
- Ed Werder: 1998–2017 (SportsCenter reporter)
- Trey Wingo: 1997–2020 (SportsCenter and NFL Live)
- Gene Wojciechowski: 1992–2023 (ESPN.com)
- Eric Wynalda: 2003–2015 (MLS and World Cup) Now at SiriusXM FC
