= Monday Night Countdown =

- Former logo used from 2011 to 2015
- Also known as: NFL Prime Monday (1993–1997)
- Genre: Pre-game show
- Directed by: Chip Dean (2006–2019); Jimmy Platt (2019–2023); Derek Mobley (2023–2025); Artie Kempner (2025–present)
- Presented by: Scott Van Pelt; Jason McCourty; Pat McAfee; Jason Kelce; Marcus Spears
- Opening theme: "Heavy Action" by Johnny Pearson (1993–present)
- Ending theme: Same as opening
- Country of origin: United States
- Original language: English
- No. of seasons: 34 (through 2026 season)

Production
- Executive producer: Norby Williamson (2006–2024)
- Producers: Steve Ackels; Roger Lewin; Jay Rothman; Lisa Salters
- Production locations: Various NFL stadiums (game telecasts); ESPN Headquarters; Bristol, Connecticut (pre-game, halftime and post-game shows); ABC and ESPN Studio; 7 Hudson Square, Manhattan, New York City (alternate pre-game, halftime and post-game shows)
- Camera setup: Multi-camera
- Running time: 120 minutes
- Production companies: National Football League; ESPN

Original release
- Network: ESPN
- Release: September 6, 1993 – present
- Network: ABC
- Release: January 9, 2016 – present
- Network: ESPN2
- Release: September 13, 2021 – present
- Network: ESPN+
- Release: September 11, 2023 – January 13, 2025
- Network: Disney+
- Release: December 9, 2024
- Network: NFL Network
- Release: September 14, 2026 – present

Related
- Monday Night Football; Manningcast; NFL on ABC; NFL on ESPN; NFL Network Exclusive Game Series

Monday Night Countdown (officially Monday Night Countdown presented by DraftKings Sportsbook for sponsorship reasons) is an American pre-game show that is broadcast on ESPN, ABC and the NFL Network, preceding its coverage of Monday Night Football. For the network's non-Monday broadcasts, the pregame show is simply titled NFL Countdown. When it debuted in 1993 as NFL Prime Monday and Monday Night Football was airing on ABC, the pregame show was one of the first cross-pollinations between ESPN and ABC Sports, each of which operated largely under separate management at the time. The show was renamed Monday Night Countdown in 1998 to match its sister show Sunday NFL Countdown and Monday Night Football moved from ABC to ESPN in 2006. When ABC began airing selected Monday Night Football games in 2016, the network's broadcasts were preceded by simulcasts of Monday Night Countdown. The current sponsor is US Bank, starting with the 2026 season. Previous sponsors of the show include UPS, Applebee's, Call of Duty, Courtyard by Marriott, Subway, Panera and ESPN Bet.

== History ==
=== ABC Monday Night Football ===
The show was initially hosted by Mike Tirico along with analysts Joe Theismann, Craig James, Phil Simms and Ron Jaworski. Mike Ditka also discussed certain topics and Chris Mortensen brought news and rumors from around the league. John Clayton was also a regular guest on the show. Former presenters include Mike Tirico, Bill Parcells, Michael Irvin and Sterling Sharpe. During the 2005 season, it enjoyed its best ratings ever and was the highest-rated studio sports show on cable television. On occasion, the crew appeared on-site at the game, but for the most part, the show was aired from the studios in Bristol, Connecticut.

=== ESPN Monday Night Football ===
==== 2006 ====
In 2006, the show began appearing at the Monday Night Football site live as the game moved to ESPN from ABC. Stuart Scott moved to host of NFL Primetime which precedes Monday Night Countdown and Chris Berman moved from NFL Primetime to Monday Night Countdown and was joined by returning analysts Tom Jackson and Michael Irvin along with new analyst from Sunday NFL Countdown Steve Young. Ron Jaworski also contributed to the show along with Chris Mortensen, Ed Werder and Sal Paolantonio. Also in 2006, Monday Night Countdown introduced a new logo and new graphics as part of The Syndicate's new NFL package for ESPN. In the same fashion as all ESPN NFL studio shows, Monday Night Countdown adopted ABC's alternate football musical theme, though presented as a shuffle.

==== 2007 ====
Beginning with the 2007 NFL season, the show cutback its onsite presence by having its main anchor team at ESPN studios in Bristol, but still kept a set at the actual game site.

==== 2008 ====
The Bristol team was Berman, Jackson, Mortensen, Mike Ditka, Keyshawn Johnson and Cris Carter. The on-site team is Scott, Young and Emmitt Smith.

==== 2009–2012 ====
The Bristol team was Berman, Jackson, Mortensen, Ditka, Johnson and Carter. The on-site team was Scott, Young and Matt Millen (later Trent Dilfer) in the third spot.

On September 17, 2012, Monday Night Countdown moved up to the 6:30 ET timeslot and expanded to 2 hours. As a result, SportsCenter Monday Kickoff had its runtime cut in half, from 60 minutes to 30 minutes only. Additionally, Monday Night Countdown debuted a new program logo that closely resembles that of Monday Night Football and a new graphics scheme package matching that of Monday Night Football. Also, Monday Night Countdown began using MNF's "Heavy Action" theme music as this program's own theme music.

==== 2013 ====
Ray Lewis is added to the on-site team after his retirement from the NFL in 2012.

On December 23, 2013, the final scheduled Monday Night Football broadcast of that season, Chris Berman was at Candlestick Park in San Francisco covering the 49ers' final home game in that stadium, while Stuart Scott was at ESPN's Bristol studios. The 49ers defeated the Atlanta Falcons, 34–24, in the MNF season finale. That game was also the 36th and final Monday Night Football game — and the last NFL game — ever played at Candlestick Park.

==== 2014 ====
On September 8, 2014, Monday Night Countdown moved to a brand-new set inside Digital Center 2 of ESPN's Bristol studios, which shares the same set as Sunday NFL Countdown and NFL Primetime. However, the Monday Night Football graphics package is still used, but the rundown graphic was changed to match the one used on SportsCenter. 1 week later (September 15, 2014), Monday Night Countdown moved up to the 6:00 p.m. ET timeslot, which resulted in SportsCenter Monday Kickoff not returning for the 2014 season and moving the 6:00 p.m. ET edition of SportsCenter to ESPN2 on Mondays during the NFL season.

==== 2015 ====
Suzy Kolber, who substituted for the then-ailing Stuart Scott during most of the 2014 season, took over Scott's role permanently as an on-site host. She was previously a sideline reporter for Monday Night Football from 2006 to 2010. Additionally, Monday Night Countdown debuted a new logo resembling its other NFL-themed studio-show properties, along with a new graphics package that is also used for MNF.

==== 2016 ====
With the exception of Chris Berman (who remained in the Bristol studio), the entire Monday Night Countdown crew were moved to the Monday Night Football game site, joining on-site host Suzy Kolber. Meanwhile, Berman was joined in the Bristol studio each week by analysts who work or had previously worked at ESPN. However, Berman and the Monday Night Countdown crew did the show on November 21 from Estadio Azteca in Mexico City for the game between the Oakland Raiders and Houston Texans and December 12 from Gillette Stadium in Foxborough, Massachusetts. This was also Berman's final season as a host for ESPN's NFL-themed studio shows.

==== 2017 ====
Suzy Kolber was named host of Monday Night Countdown on March 23, 2017. She replaced Chris Berman, who departed after 30 seasons of hosting NFL-themed studio shows, though he still appeared in occasional segments. In addition to her pregame duties, Kolber now hosts all halftime and post-game shows, normally from the game site; however, the October 9, 2017, November 27, 2017, and December 25, 2017, shows all originated from ESPN's Bristol studio. The Christmas Day episode, which only ran for 45 minutes, did not have Woodson or Young; Rex Ryan did the show.

==== 2019 ====
Woodson left ESPN for Fox and Hasselbeck left Countdown to take over as a full-time co-analyst role for ESPN's Thursday Night College Football games. Therefore, the lineup was Suzy Kolber, Adam Schefter, Randy Moss, Steve Young and Louis Riddick. The show got a new graphics package. The October 28 show originated from Bristol instead of Pittsburgh, probably because the show had been there earlier in the season.

=== Monday Night Football on both ESPN and ABC ===
==== 2020 ====
Monday Night Countdown, along with most of ESPN's NFL-themed studio shows, moved to the network's South Street Seaport studios in New York City for the 2020 season. With the exception of Louis Riddick, who switched roles with Booger McFarland and moved to the Monday Night Football broadcast booth (the latter of whom took over Riddick's previous role of studio analyst), the lineup remained the same from the previous season.

==== 2021 ====
After being at the network's New York City facilities due to the COVID-19 pandemic the previous year, Monday Night Countdown returned to the game site for the first time in two seasons. Kolber, McFarland, Moss and Young all returned from the previous season. The show originated from New York instead of Baltimore October 11 and Washington November 29. Young didn't do the show October 18; Alex Smith did the show for the first time.

==== 2022 ====
Prior to the start of the season, Berry left for NBC Sunday Night Football and a fantasy football show on Peacock. Larry Fitzgerald and Robert Griffin III made their debuts. Randy Moss left to do Sunday NFL Countdown only. Alex Smith made more appearances, but not every week. The October 31 and December 26, 2022, and January 2, 2023, shows originated from New York instead of Cleveland, Indianapolis and Cincinnati, respectively. On those shows, Young was not at the former and in a remote location on the latter two. The January 2 show ran on ESPN2 and ABC (due to the Rose Bowl airing on ESPN) and ran for an hour and 15 minutes; Rex Ryan substituted for Griffin, who was calling the Cotton Bowl that same day.

==== 2023 ====
Kolber and Young became two of the several ESPN employees laid off in late June 2023. On August 21, 2023, three weeks before the first Monday Night game of the season, it was announced that veteran SportsCenter anchor Scott Van Pelt would replace Kolber as Monday Night Countdown host. Fellow newcomers Ryan Clark and Marcus Spears would also be joining the show, with Griffin and Schefter returning. Van Pelt would also host the postgame show and anchor SportsCenter with SVP from the site of Monday Night Countdown.

This season, ABC started to join ESPN in airing the pregame show at 7:30 p.m. ET, similar to how CBS, NBC and Fox used to do for Thursday Night Football, instead of joining coverage at the traditional start time of the prime time slot at 8:00 p.m. ET. This only affected those 8:15 p.m. ET games that ABC was originally scheduled to air at the start of the season (including when two games was airing on September 18, in which ESPN started the pregame at 5 p.m. ET and ABC exclusively resumed the pregame at 7:30 p.m. ET); when ABC announced in September that it would simulcast an additional 10 games due to the 2023 Hollywood labor disputes, local affiliates kept the 7:30–8:00 p.m. ET slot on those dates. On September 25 when ABC aired the 7:15 p.m. ET game as part of the ABC-ESPN doubleheader, the pregame show instead preceded the ESPN 8:15 p.m. ET game, while ABC aired SportsCenter after its game to fill the remaining prime time block until 11:00 p.m. ET. When the ABC-ESPN doubleheader games both kickoff at 8:15 p.m. ET on December 11, both networks will still begin to air the pregame show as usual at 6:00 and 7:30 p.m. ET, respectively and ESPN will air the postgame as usual.

The show did not originate from either of the September 18 doubleheader game sites of Charlotte and Pittsburgh. The show did not originate from either of the September 25 doubleheader game sites of Tampa and Cincinnati. Then on October 9, Van Pelt was unable to host after losing his voice and was replaced by MNF play-by-play announcer Joe Buck (who had hosted Fox NFL Sunday in 2006) for the first part of the pregame show and reporter Michelle Beisner-Buck during the last half-hour of the pregame show and the halftime show. The show did not originate from the game site of Minneapolis on October 23 and November 27 or East Rutherford, New Jersey on November 6. The show didn't originate from the doubleheader sites of Miami and East Rutherford on December 11, as well.

==== 2024 ====
Jason Kelce (who retired the previous season) joined ESPN and later replaced Robert Griffin III, the latter of whom was fired in August, along with former Sunday NFL Countdown host Samantha Ponder. Both the September 23 episode aired from Bristol instead of the doubleheader sites of Buffalo and Cincinnati and the September 30 episode aired from Bristol instead of the doubleheader sites of Miami and Detroit aired at 5 p.m. Eastern Time instead of 6 p.m.

ABC reverted to beginning coverage at 8 p.m. ET on most weeks after airing several pregame shows before games the previous season, it will only air on the Saturday doubleheader week, before the December 16 split doubleheader and the Monday night wild card game.

==== 2026 ====
In 2026, ESPN added Jason McCourty to replace the departing Ryan Clark, while Pat McAfee also joined the show.

With ESPN's acquisition of NFL Network, ESPN cancelled the channel's competing pre-game show and replaced it with a simulcast of Monday Night Countdown.

== Personalities ==
This is a list of personalities that currently or formerly appeared on Monday Night Countdown.

=== Current ===
==== Main panelists ====
- Scott Van Pelt (host, 2023–present)
- Jason Kelce (analyst, 2024–present)
- Pat McAfee (analyst, 2026–present)
- Jason McCourty (analyst, 2026–present)
- Marcus Spears (analyst, 2023–present)

==== Contributors ====
- Michelle Beisner-Buck: (Contributor, 2016–present)
- Katie Feeney: (Contributor, 2025–present)
- Sal Paolantonio: (Contributor, 2006–present)
- Laura Rutledge: (Sideline reporter, 2023–present)
- Lisa Salters: (Sideline reporter, 2012–present)

==== NFL Insiders ====
- Adam Schefter: (2009–present)

=== Former ===
==== Hosts ====
- Chris Berman: (2006–2016)
- Suzy Kolber: (2015–2022)
- Stuart Scott: (2002–2005 and 2007–2014)
- Mike Tirico: (1993–2001)

==== Analysts ====
- Cris Carter: (2008–2015)
- Ryan Clark: (2023–2025)
- Trent Dilfer: (2011–2016)
- Mike Ditka: (2008–2015)
- Larry Fitzgerald: (2022–2023)
- Robert Griffin III: (2022–2023)
- Matt Hasselbeck: (2016–2018)
- Michael Irvin: (2003–2006)
- Tom Jackson: (2006–2015)
- Craig James: (1993–1995)
- Ron Jaworski: (1993–2005)
- Keyshawn Johnson: (2007–2015)
- Ray Lewis: (2013–2015)
- Booger McFarland: (2020–2022)
- Matt Millen: (2009–2010)
- Randy Moss: (2016–2021)
- Bill Parcells: (2007)
- Louis Riddick: (2019)
- Sterling Sharpe: (1995–2002)
- Phil Simms: (1994)
- Alex Smith: (2021–2023)
- Emmitt Smith: (2007–2008)
- Joe Theismann: (1993–1997)
- Charles Woodson: (2016–2018)
- Steve Young: (2006–2022)

==== Contributors ====
- Mike Ditka: (2004–2005; 2007)
- Chris Mortensen: (1993–2022)
- Rick Reilly: (2008–2015)
- Louis Riddick: (2017–2018)
- Michele Tafoya: (2006–2011)
- Ed Werder: (2006–2016)

== Segments ==
=== Current ===
- Playmaking Made Easy: The presenters of the program are seen outside giving a full demonstration of how to perform certain moves.
- Sunday Snapshot: Introduced on September 25, 2017. Highlights of Sunday's games are shown, with a still represented by a click of a camera. Originally, the Sunday Snapshot consisted of a theme (e.g., upsets) but now is about a player's performance from the previous day's game.
- Game Balls: Introduced on October 2, 2017. Kolber and the other analysts give out game balls to those who had an outstanding performance over the weekend. It is similar to the Game Balls that Berman and Tom Jackson gave out on NFL Primetime and other shows.
- Boomer's Best: Introduced in 2017, where Chris Berman highlights historic moments from the history of Monday Night Football. For the NFL's 100th season in 2019, the format was changed to a countdown of the top 50 plays in NFL history. For the 2020 and 2021 seasons, it was changed to a countdown of the top plays of the weekend. By the fourth week of the 2021 season, the name was changed to "Boomer's Best" (it had been called "Boomer's Vault".)
- Hometown Heroes: Introduced in 2018, it features a player from the night's game helping out in his team's community.

=== Former ===
- In the Pocket: Former quarterback Steve Young analyzed the performances the league's quarterbacks for Thursday and Sunday games.
- Field Pass: Players were shown warming up for the game. Beginning with the November 12, 2018 episode the "Field Pass" name was not being used, but they were still showing player warmups. For several years, it was presented by Dunkin' Donuts.
- Teams at 20: An all-day segment, including on SportsCenter, where various facets of each of the Monday night teams were reviewed.
- Sunday Drive: Ron Jaworski analyzed a key drive from the previous day's action, from start to finish.
- The Mort Report: Chris Mortensen broke down trade rumors, coaching changes and injuries.
- Playmakers: Michael Irvin reviewed the players who made the biggest difference in Sunday's games.
- Jacked Up: At the end of the show Tom Jackson counted down the top five biggest hits of the week. In 2006, the format went to 6, and 6 to 4 were done on the show, and 3 to 1 were done at halftime. Only hits that did not result in a penalty or injury were featured in this segment. Discontinued at the start of the 2008 season due to the growing issue of glorifying 'big hits' causing concussions in the game. It was brought back as a one-time tribute to Jackson, following his passing, on the November 22, 2026 edition of Sunday NFL Countdown.
- Dilfer's Dimes: Trent Dilfer shows the best passes from the week's action from the NFL and college football. The segment was previously on SportsCenter Sunday nights before it moved to Monday Night Countdown in 2016. Dilfer was among the employees laid off by ESPN in late April 2017, so it can be surmised the segment has been discontinued.
- Sorry Bro!: a segment similar to "C'mon Man!" where plays from the previous day were shown and Kolber and the analysts would end his/her segment by saying "Sorry Bro!" It only aired once on September 21, 2015.
- Chalk Talk: Jon Gruden interviewed a player or coach from that night's game. It was discontinued after Gruden returned to coaching the Raiders. It was sponsored by Corona, Burger King, Dick's Sporting Goods and Nationwide Insurance.
- You Got Mossed!: Introduced in 2016, this segment features highlights of catches by wide receivers in high school football, the CFL, college football, the NFL and even MLB, the NBA and Ultimate Frisbee, while the defenders are being described as getting "mossed" (hence the term named after ESPN NFL analyst & former NFL wide receiver Randy Moss).
- C'Mon Man!: Introduced on October 27, 2008. Discontinued in the 2023 season. It stands as Monday Night Countdown's longest and most popular running segment to date. During the show, they will each describe a play or series of plays that made them scratch their heads and say, "C'Mon Man!". They range from plays on the field to actions by fans and other people present at the game. This includes plays from games in the NFL, college and high school football and the Canadian Football League as well as occasionally from other sports. "C'Mon Man!" which is similar to the weekly "Not Top Plays" segment on SportsCenter was sponsored by GEICO.

== See also ==
- NFL Insiders
- NFL Live
- NFL Matchup

== Resources ==
- Press Release: ESPN'S 2006 NFL LINEUP SURROUNDS MONDAY NIGHT FOOTBALL WITH 188 YEARS OF GRIDIRON EXPERIENCE
