= NFL Primetime =

Sports television program

- Former logo used from 2006 to 2013
- Presented by: Chris Berman; Booger McFarland; Scott Van Pelt; Marcus Spears; Randy Moss
- Country of origin: United States
- Original language: English
- No. of seasons: 40 (through 2026 season)

Production
- Production locations: ESPN Headquarters; Bristol, Connecticut
- Camera setup: Multi-camera
- Running time: 60 minutes
- Production companies: National Football League; ESPN

Original release
- Network: ESPN
- Release: September 13, 1987 – present
- Network: ESPN+
- Release: September 15, 2019 – present

Related
- NFL on ESPN; ESPN Sunday Night Football

NFL Primetime is a sports television program that has aired on ESPN since 1987. The show is presented similarly to ESPN's own SportsCenter, featuring scores, highlights and analysis of every game of the week in the NFL.

When it debuted on September 13, 1987, the show aired every Sunday night during the NFL season. When NBC acquired the rights for Sunday night games beginning in the 2006, NBC also negotiated for exclusive rights for extended highlights during its Football Night in America pregame show, causing ESPN to begin airing NFL Primetime on Mondays. In 2019, the program was moved to ESPN+.

== Original format (1987–2005) ==
Until the 2006 season, NFL Primetime aired every Sunday night during the NFL season and it preceded ESPN's coverage of Sunday Night Football (it even aired when ESPN did not have a Sunday night game, especially from 1990 to 1997 when TNT had Sunday night games the first half of the season). The show was hosted by Chris Berman, with analysis from Tom Jackson. Berman and Jackson recapped Sunday afternoon's NFL games with highlights, statistics, and commentary.

Pete Axthelm was a regular from 1987 until his death in 1991. Through the show's history, other co-hosts included John Saunders, Robin Roberts, Bill Pidto, and Stuart Scott. Pidto was often the target of good-natured ribbing by Berman, since Pidto often did recaps of games featuring losing teams. Roberts also seemed to be assigned to recap almost every game the Tampa Bay Buccaneers played between 1990 and 1992, when the Bucs were fielding some of the worst teams in NFL history. The position of co-host was dropped prior to the start of the 1998 season.

During the first three rounds of the playoffs, a half-hour edition of NFL Primetime would air after the competition of each night's games. A guest analyst typically joined Jackson on the panel, while a co-host was deemed unnecessary since Berman would only need to recap only two games on those nights. An extended edition of NFL Primetime would then air after each Super Bowl at the game's site, serving as ESPN's postgame show with player interviews.

=== Presentation ===
Rather than provide the usual package of scoring highlights, NFL Primetime presented extended highlights which also showed less dramatic plays. This provided context for the greater depth of analysis of each game. A common non-dramatic play that would be shown would be a game-clinching first down while a team was running out the clock. Some of the less dramatic plays would be used to demonstrate an overall large accomplishment. During the highlights for the Chicago Bears-San Francisco 49ers matchup in 2000, when Terrell Owens broke an NFL record by catching 20 passes in a game (since broken by Brandon Marshall), all 20 of Owens's receptions were shown. Other examples involved seemingly unsuccessful plays ultimately benefitting a team. For the highlights of the Buccaneers-Miami Dolphins game in 2000, a contest marred by heavy rains which came down to the final minute, a play where Bucs running back Warrick Dunn broke a tackle in his own end zone to avoid a safety was shown to demonstrate it as one of the biggest plays contributing to the Bucs's victory.

The show began with Berman welcoming viewers and then giving a quick rundown of the late games before beginning the highlights of the early games. They were generally shown in a relatively chronological order, with the 1:00 games shown first and the 4:00/4:15 games shown near the end of the program. However, on some occasions (particularly in Week 17 when teams would be making their final push for the playoffs), the highlights would be presented less chronologically. For Week 17 games, the highlights would instead be sorted by conference, with teams competing against each other for a playoff spot or a division title shown back-to-back. Probably the show's most notable occurrence with this scenario came in Week 17 of the 1999 season, when the Green Bay Packers and Carolina Panthers tied in overall record, division record, conference record, and common opponent record, meaning that a spot involving the two teams would come down to point differential. As a result, both teams ran up the score against their opponents in their final games in order to try to outscore the other team in the race. For this scenario, the Arizona Cardinals-Packers and the New Orleans Saints-Panthers highlights were shown simultaneously, with scoring by the teams in both games shown chronologically while a graphic would be shown featuring which team was leading at the time based on point differential. When ESPN aired the Sunday Night game, the broadcast usually featured a preview of that game. Later airings of NFL Primetime featured a SportsCenter highlight of that game.

Starting in 2003, a game with either high stakes for both teams or an exciting finish (typically a 1:00 game) would be chosen by Berman, Jackson, and their staff as that week's "Prime Cut." This game would be shown in the middle of the program with an extended lead-in by Berman. Also in 2003, a segment entitled "T.J.'s Extra Point" was introduced, where Jackson would demonstrate greater analysis over a strategy a team used to great success. At the end of the show, a segment entitled "Primetime Players" would feature both Berman and Jackson choosing a player or team unit that particularly impressed them from that week's games. At the turn of the millennium, a fan vote for that week's primetime player would also be conducted for the show on ESPN's website.

=== Music ===
A staple of the show was the various FirstCom Music instrumental pieces that played in the background during the highlights, while Berman and Jackson recapped each game. This often gave the games, even in highlight form, a more epic feel overall. This feature continues during highlights on The Blitz.

For the most part, highlights from the show would feature FirstCom Music scores over the highlights. Some songs were even played on a consistent basis for certain teams. The Buffalo Bills, for example, often had their game played out (regardless of outcome) to a dramatic piece entitled "Powersurge," featuring triumphant passages of brass instruments. The Oakland Raiders, meanwhile, were often represented by an ominous-sounding piece called "Bad Company," that featured extensive use of minor-key strings, horns, and keyboards. Other songs were commonly used for certain situations. "International Statement," an epic-sounding song complete with a climactic build-up of low brass and strings that was arguably NFL Primetime's signature song, was often used for a high-stakes game, while "Grid-Lock," a lighter song featuring a more subdued introductory horn riff and an extended guitar solo (unusual for a song utilized in the program), was utilized for relatively unexciting games involving teams at the bottom of the standings.

On rare occasions, however, the standard FirstCom Music themes would be replaced by other music themes. For the Raiders-Pittsburgh Steelers matchup in 2000, which marked their last meeting at Three Rivers Stadium as well as the stadium's second to last game, the music was replaced by classic NFL Films themes by Sam Spence including "A Golden Boy Again" and "The Raiders," while Berman confused then-current Raiders and Steelers with legendary ones. A similar example involved the San Diego Chargers-St. Louis Rams matchup earlier in 2000, when the music was replaced by the William Tell Overture to underscore the Rams as the "Greatest Show on Turf" (with the music subsequently muted when the Chargers were shown making a good play). On other occasions, non-standard music themes would interrupt the themes being played on the highlights. For the Washington Redskins' final game at RFK Stadium in 1996, a 36–10 win over the Dallas Cowboys, the music was briefly replaced by their fight song "Hail to the Redskins" before returning to the previous standard theme for the final stats. In 2000, when the Baltimore Ravens scored a touchdown after having failed to score one in their previous five games, the music was briefly interrupted with celebratory music before returning to the standard FirstCom theme for the remainder of the highlights.

Finally, music was occasionally altered on the program, particularly in situations involving injured players. On some occasions where a serious injury or other tragic event occurred, the music would be played at a noticeably softer volume than usual, or would be muted entirely until the highlight resumed. After then-Indianapolis Colts head coach Tony Dungy's son James committed suicide in 2005, the highlights for the Colts's first game after his death began with silence while tributes taking place during the game were shown, with the music only playing for the actual game itself.

== Move to Monday (2006–2018) ==
When NBC acquired the rights for Sunday night games beginning in the 2006 season, NBC negotiated for exclusive rights for extended highlights during its Football Night in America pregame show. ESPN responded by moving the show to Mondays and splitting the program into two versions. NFL Primetime would then return to its old format during the playoffs, still airing on ESPN after the competition of each night's games.

=== Early showing ===
Originally, the first version aired two-and-a-half hours before ESPN's telecast of Monday Night Football, normally 6 p.m. Eastern Time. It was hosted by Stuart Scott along with analysts Ron Jaworski and Mike Ditka and aired from the site of the Monday night game preceding Monday Night Countdown. (The program broadcast from a parking lot set, in contrast to Monday Night Countdown, which takes place inside the stadium. When the package began with two Monday night games on September 11, 2006, Primetime aired from McAfee Coliseum in Oakland, California, while Countdown originated at FedExField in Landover, Maryland).

Due to low ratings (partially due to the repositioning of what was a Sunday evening staple), this early edition of NFL Primetime was relocated to the ESPN studios in Bristol, Connecticut every other week starting October 16.

In 2007, this show gained a new time slot, 4 p.m. ET, switching with SportsCenter Monday Kickoff, all programs were moved to the Bristol studio, and the second version's hosts (see below) were also assigned to the earlier show. Scott was sent to a new remote set used by Monday Night Countdown.

=== Late showing ===
The second version airs ninety minutes after Monday Night Football ends, and it originates from the ESPN studios. This edition is hosted by the NFL Live team of Trey Wingo and analysts Merril Hoge, and occasionally Mark Schlereth or Mike Ditka. In 2008, Trent Dilfer joined as an analyst. In 2011, Tim Hasselbeck replaced Dilfer. This is the only version of the show to actually be in primetime, albeit only on the West Coast at 10:00 p.m. PT or slightly later. This version re-airs Tuesday afternoons at 2:00 p.m. ET.

Both versions show highlights, but for a shorter period of time than on the older program and with more extended analysis segments. The highlights on the current incarnation of NFL Primetime tend to be more story driven, emphasizing key player performances or game storylines as opposed to a normal recap that is found on SportsCenter. Both shows are presented by Miller Lite.

On December 24, 2011, during week 16 of the 2011 NFL season, ESPN aired Primetime in its classic timeslot and format, with Berman and Jackson recapping the action. This was due to the weekend's NFL games being played on Saturday of that weekend, and with the NBC contract running for Sundays only, ESPN its first original Primetime in 6 years.

== The Blitz (2006–2016) ==
Following the re-tooling of NFL Primetime, Chris Berman and Tom Jackson were given an extended segment of the Sunday night edition of SportsCenter (11 p.m. ET) called The Blitz. The segment follows the same structure as the original version of NFL Primetime, featuring Berman and Jackson using the same player nicknames, catch phrases, and back-and-forth banter as the original show.

On January 8, 2007, Chris Berman and Tom Jackson returned to NFL Primetime to present highlights of the 2006 NFL Playoffs games between the New York Jets and the New England Patriots and the New York Giants and the Philadelphia Eagles, and they remained for the entire postseason that followed.

ESPN has not used the NFL name or logo in the official segment name or in advertising, leading to unconfirmed rumors of not being given permission to do so by the league. In 2007, however, on-screen graphics surrounding the set has referred to both "The Blitz" and "NFL Blitz."

Nike sponsored the segments in both years in 2006 and '07; it was replaced by Old Spice in 2008.

== Early SportsCenter (2008–2016) ==
In 2008, an extended version of The Blitz has aired as part of SportsCenter from 7 to 8 or 8:15 p.m. ET. The hosts are Berman, Jackson, Saunders and Trent Dilfer. In addition to highlights, the network has extended additional game statistics, standings, and leaderboards on the right-hand portion of the screen. It is in direct competition to Football Night in America, although it is believed that FNIA still has the official advantage in percentage of the show devoted to highlights. Coincidentally, the revamp of SportsCenter came after NBC hired Dan Patrick to team with Keith Olbermann on FNIA highlights; Patrick and Olbermann were the premier anchor team on that show in the 1990s.

== NFL Primetime on ESPN+ (2019–present) ==
On September 13, 2019, ESPN announced that Berman and Jackson would return for a new digital-only edition of NFL Primetime, streaming weekly throughout the NFL season on ESPN+ beginning on September 15, 2019 (in time for Week 2 highlights). The program streams live at 7:30 p.m. ET on Sundays during the regular season and is updated with highlights for the Sunday and Monday night games upon their completion. Playoff editions of NFL Primetime also stream on ESPN+ after the competition of each night's games; conference championship round and Super Bowl editions are also simulcast on ESPN. The show also features some of the same music used on the original version of NFL Primetime. Due to the COVID-19 pandemic, in 2020 Jackson opted out of the program. He was replaced by Booger McFarland; this change subsequently became permanent.

As for ESPN itself, this show was replaced with a new program, NFL Rewind (also hosted by Wingo with Tim Hasselbeck and former NFL head coach John Fox as analysts), which follows the same format as NFL Primetime.

In the 2026 season, as a nod to ESPN's acquisition of the channel, NFL Network's competing highlights program NFL GameDay Highlights began to also use the NFL Primetime music package.

== Personalities ==
=== Current ===
- Chris Berman (Full season host, 1987–2005 and 2019–present, contributor and playoff host 2006–present)
- Booger McFarland (Full season analyst, 2020–present)
- Scott Van Pelt (Late game host, 2019–present)
- Marcus Spears (Analyst, 2020–present)
- Randy Moss (Super Bowl analyst)

=== Former ===
- Tom Jackson (Full season analyst, 1987–2005 and 2019–2020, contributor and playoff analyst 2006–2016)
- Pete Axthelm (Host, 1987–1990)
- John Saunders (Host, 1987–1989)
- Bill Pidto (Host, 1995–1996)
- Robin Roberts (Host, 1990–1994)
- Stuart Scott (Host, 1997–2006)
- Mike Golic (Analyst, 2006)
- Ron Jaworski (Analyst, 2006)
- Mike Ditka (Analyst, 2006–2007)
- Mark Schlereth (Analyst, 2006–2007)
- Trent Dilfer (Analyst 2008–2010)
- Merril Hoge (Analyst, 2006–2016)
- Trey Wingo (Host, 2006–2019)
- Tim Hasselbeck (Analyst, 2011–2020)
- John Fox (Analyst, 2019)
- Jeff Saturday (Analyst, 2017–2018 and 2020–2022)
- Wendi Nix (Host, 2020–2022)
- Steve Young (Super Bowl analyst)
- Ryan Clark (Fill-in analyst, 2019–2025)

== See also ==
- Monday Night Countdown
- Monday Night Football
- NFL Insiders
- NFL Live
- NFL Matchup
- Sunday NFL Countdown
