= Chris Berman =

American sportscaster (born 1955)

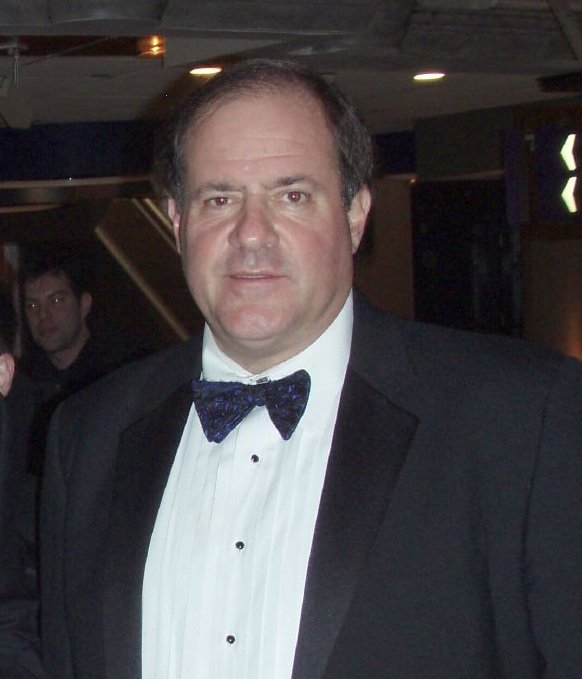
- Berman in 2007
- Born: Christopher James Berman; May 10, 1955 (age 71); Greenwich, Connecticut, U.S.
- Education: Brown University (B.A.)
- Occupations: TV, radio sportscaster, television personality
- Years active: 1977–present
- Known for: Work as co-host of Sunday NFL Countdown program on ESPN (1985–2016)
- Title: NFL studio host, ESPN / ESPN SportsCenter anchor, sports commentator
- Spouse: Katherine Alexinski (m. 1983; died 2017)
- Children: 2

Christopher James Berman (born May 10, 1955), nicknamed "Boomer", is an American sportscaster. He has been an anchor for SportsCenter on ESPN for decades, starting a month after its initial launch in 1979, and joined ABC in 2020. He hosted ESPN's Sunday NFL Countdown program from 1985 to 2016 and NFL Primetime from 1987 to 2005 and since 2019. He has also anchored Monday Night Countdown, U.S. Open golf, the Stanley Cup Final, and other programming on ESPN and ABC Sports. Berman calls play-by-play of select Major League Baseball games for ESPN, which included the Home Run Derby until 2016.

A six-time honoree of the National Sports Media Association's National Sportscaster of the Year award, Berman was instrumental in establishing ESPN's lasting popularity during the network's formative years. He is well known for his various catchphrases and quirky demeanor.

In January 2017, ESPN announced that Berman would be stepping down from several NFL-related roles at the network, but would remain at the company. In May 2021, Berman signed a multiyear contract with ESPN to continue to host NFL Primetime.

== Early life ==
Berman was born in Greenwich, Connecticut, and grew up in Irvington, New York, the son of Peggy Shevell (née Tenenbaum), who worked as a reporter-researcher for Time magazine, and James Keliner Berman, a corporate executive vice president. He was raised Jewish. During his childhood, he went to Camp Winnebago in Fayette, Maine. He enrolled at the Hackley School in 1970, and graduated from Brown University in 1977 with a degree in history, where he was the sports director of the school's radio station, WBRU.

== Career (1977–present) ==
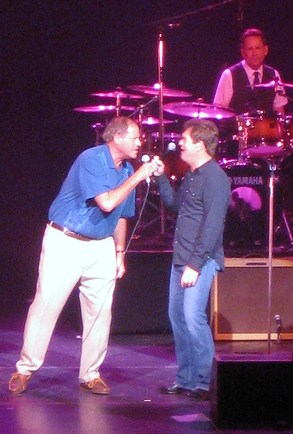
Berman sings "Walking on a Thin Line" with Huey Lewis and the News on stage

Berman's sportscasting career began at Hartford's WVIT-TV as a weekend sports anchor. He joined ESPN in 1979, a month after its founding, and has been with the network ever since. He is one of ESPN's longest-tenured employees, and the only remaining SportsCenter anchor from 1979. He spent 31 years as the host of both Sunday NFL Countdown, and ten years hosting Monday Night Countdown. In addition, during the NFL season, he hosts the evening SportsCenter (airing generally at either 7:30 PM Eastern Time or 11 PM Eastern Time) along with Herm Edwards, who replaced Tom Jackson for the 2016 season. Berman often appears on SportsCenter at night (midnight to 1 a.m.) hosting brief segments called "Chris Berman's two-minute drill". From 1988 to 1989, he hosted ESPN's first game show, Boardwalk and Baseball's Super Bowl of Sports Trivia.

By 1993, Berman was described as the leader of the ESPN team and one of the most recognizable sportscasters in the business. "The true test is when Chris is on, turn down your TV and open your window. You will hear him. The microphone is nothing but a prop", said fellow ESPN anchor Keith Olbermann. In December 2008, the Associated Press ran a long retrospective on Berman's 30-year career with ESPN. "He is our most important person", said Norby Williamson, ESPN's vice president of production. "He is the face of ESPN", he added. At the time, Berman noted that his contract with ESPN would expire on his 55th birthday, and that he did not see himself broadcasting into his 60s. In April 2010, however, ESPN extended Berman's contract for an undisclosed period of time, only noting that it was a multi-year deal. The contract was eventually revealed to expire at the end of 2016.

Between 1995 and 2006, Berman hosted Monday Night Football as well as live coverage of three Super Bowls for ABC Sports. He continued to host MNF when ESPN got the rights in 2006.

Berman was a season ticket holder for the Hartford Whalers and was a strong supporter of the team's staying in Connecticut. He occasionally makes reference to the team, sometimes even by humming the team's theme song, "Brass Bonanza". Berman has also become a strong backer of the Buffalo Bills in recent years. In an interview with Buffalo Bills reporter and play-by-play voice John Murphy on July 26, 2012, Berman acknowledged that you could call him a "Bills Booster". This sentiment is also echoed in Berman's on-air phrase, "No one circles the wagons like the Buffalo Bills!" In addition, he has been involved with several events relating to the Bills, such as team founder Ralph Wilson's induction into the Pro Football Hall of Fame, and Bruce Smith's Bills Hall of Fame induction in September 2016. Berman signed a new contract in January 2017 for a reduced schedule, but remains at ESPN.

On October 29, 2018, Berman served as the on-field emcee for Thurman Thomas's number retirement ceremony. In May 2019, Berman called a three-game series for the Boston Red Sox Radio Network alongside longtime Red Sox broadcaster Joe Castiglione.

In 2019, Berman and Tom Jackson re-united for a revival of NFL Primetime, streamed exclusively on ESPN+. In addition, they have also hosted the "fastest three minutes" segments on the Monday Night Football halftime show. Berman continues to present this segment solo as of the 2025 season.

Berman signed a multiyear contract with ESPN in May 2021 to continue to host NFL PrimeTime. In the ESPN contract announcement, Berman said "ESPN has been almost two-thirds of my life. I'm honored that what I do still works." He signed a new contract in May 2025 that runs through 2029, the network's 50th anniversary.

In 2026, Berman spoke positively about Bill Rasmussen after his death at the age of 93 from Parkinson's Disease. He said, "Bill was our George Washington and good friend" in an interview. Rasmussen helped establish the Entertainment and Sports Programming Network in 1979. The channel was renamed ESPN in 1984.

=== Style ===
Berman is well known for his various catchphrases and player nicknames.

- His mid-play prediction of a touchdown run as "He could...go...all...the...way!" is perhaps his most famous phrase, and one of the first he adopted. It was featured on the Jock Rock, Volume 2 compilation album.
- His home run calls of "Back, back, back, back...Gone!", which he implements most commonly during the MLB Home Run Derby.
- A "Whoop!" is uttered during highlights when a player makes a quick move or causes someone to miss or make a mistake.
- "Tick, tick, tick, tick tick tick tick..." during a post-game recap, for a play or moment in which the clock is a factor.
- When a large player such as a lineman runs with the football, Berman describes him as "rumblin', bumblin', stumblin'".
- Berman is known for integrating puns into player nicknames. For example, he dubbed former Minnesota Twins pitcher Bert Blyleven "Bert Be Home Blyleven". He referred to San Diego Chargers running back Eric Bieniemy as "Eric Sleeping With Bieniemy", and Jeff Bagwell as "Jeff Are You Treating the Old Bagwell". Other examples include "Young Again" for Oddibe McDowell, "ABCDEFG" for Dallas Cowboys wide receiver CeeDee Lamb, and an imitation of a sneeze for Indianapolis Colts quarterback Gardner Minshew, where Berman goes, "min-min-min, MIN-SHEW!"
- When speaking about the Las Vegas Raiders, he will often pronounce them as "the RRRAY-DAHS" in an homage to late owner Al Davis's accent.
- When a ball carrier breaks a tackle, he will mimic a collision sound after every broken tackle.
- The Detroit Lions have never won an NFC Championship Game and, as such, have never made it to the Super Bowl, earning them a long history of denigration. Thus, when the Lions do something good, Berman will sometimes utter the word, "LIONS???" in a surprised tone.

Berman adopts the persona of his alter ego, "The Swami", to make predictions on Sunday NFL Countdown. For twelve consecutive years "The Swami" predicted a Super Bowl between the San Francisco 49ers and the Buffalo Bills. During part of that span, for seven years straight, one of those teams made it to the Super Bowl, but never against each other.

=== Reception ===
Many have enjoyed Berman's approach over the years, and he has won various awards. A 1990 Sports Illustrated feature article cited traits that struck a chord with his TV audience: playfulness, humor, and a Fred Flintstone-like persona. The nicknames were called a key to his success. His genuine love of sports was also noted.

However, he has also drawn a good deal of criticism. Over time, his style came to rub quite a few viewers the wrong way. His detractors find him overly bombastic – and worse, unfunny. A "blowhard...tossing out corny clichés" was one description. Columnist Phil Mushnick viewed his "clown act" as forced, self-serving, and stale. "Schtick" is another label that has been applied. A Paste article from 2017 noted that the reasons for his appeal were also what made him eventually grow tiresome.

=== In other media ===
Berman appeared in Adam Sandler's 1998 comedy The Waterboy as well as Sandler's The Longest Yard in 2005, playing himself as the play-by-play announcer of the prison football game. Berman also appeared as himself in Necessary Roughness in 1991, The Program in 1993 (though was a little out of place doing college football), Little Big League in 1994, as well as Eddie and Kingpin in 1996. He made a cameo appearance in the 1995 Hootie and the Blowfish video for the single "Only Wanna Be With You." Berman made a cameo in the 2013 comedy Grown Ups 2. Berman appears in Nutrisystem commercials with Don Shula, Dan Marino, Terry Bradshaw, and Mike Golic, using some of his trademark phrases and nicknames to show how much weight they lost. He also appears in commercials for repair insurer Carshield.

He appears as the host of SportsCenter in ESPN NFL 2K5; he is also an unlockable free agent.

== Personal life ==
Berman married Katherine "Kathy" Alexinski in 1983. The couple had two children.

Kathy Berman died in a traffic collision in Woodbury, Connecticut, on May 10, 2017, Chris' 62nd birthday. Katherine Berman was driving drunk when she crashed into the back of another vehicle, killing herself and the other driver. She was driving approximately 82 mph in a 45 mph zone, and had a blood alcohol content (BAC) of 0.26.

== Honors ==
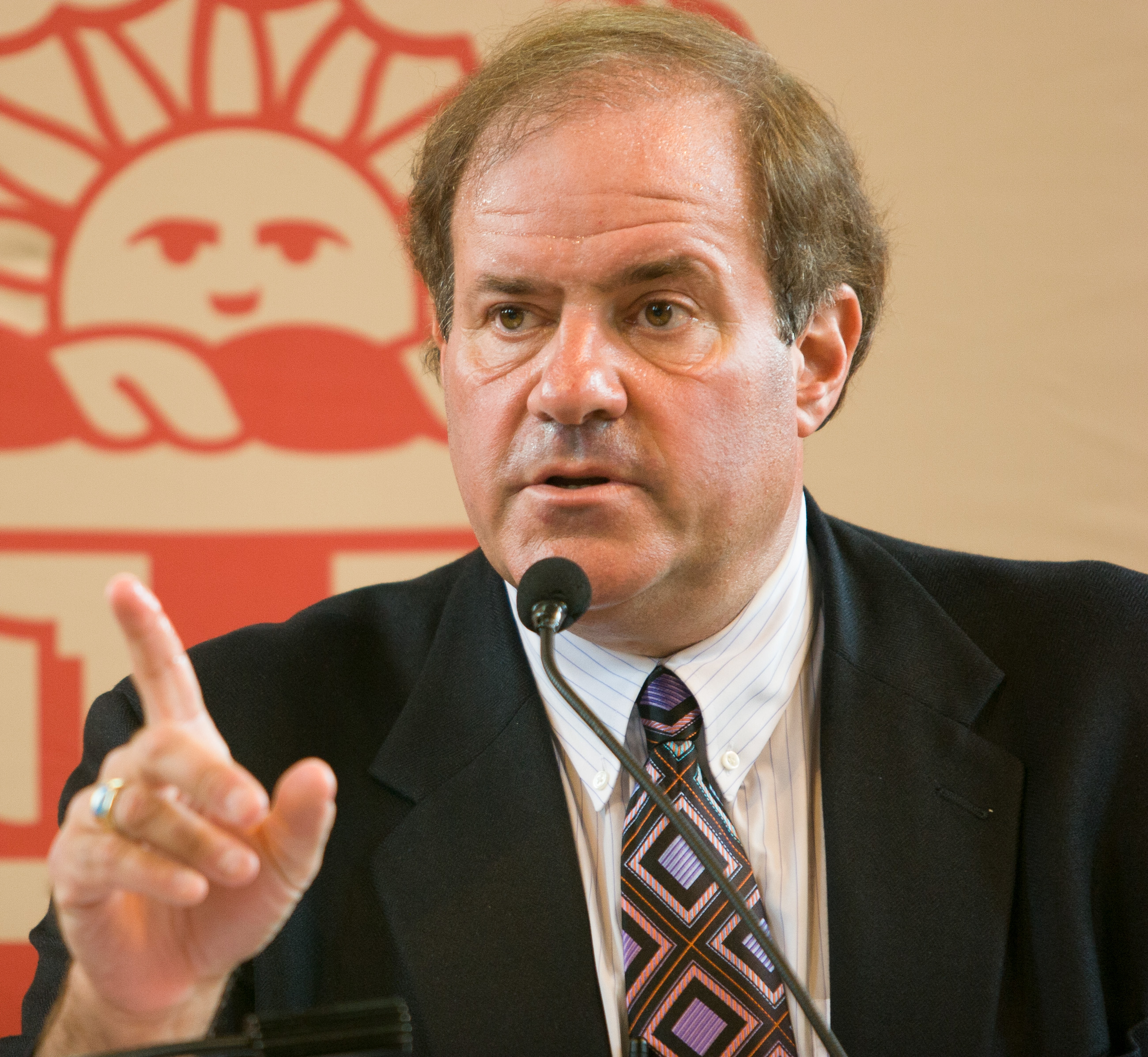
Berman speaks at Brown University before receiving his honorary degree in 2007

- National Sportscasters and Sportswriters Association National Sportscaster of the Year (1989, 1990, 1993, 1994, 1996, 2001)
- American Sportscasters Association Sportscaster of the Year – Studio Host (1995, 1997, 1998)
- CableACE Award Best Cable Sportscaster 1987, 1988, 1990
- 1997 "TV's Most Fascinating Stars" from People
- 2001 Maxwell Football Club's Reds Bagnell Award
- 2007 honorary degree from Brown University.
- 2009 Presented Ralph C. Wilson Jr. into the Pro Football Hall of Fame
- Received star on the Hollywood Walk of Fame on May 24, 2010
- Received the Pete Rozelle Radio-Television Award on July 12, 2010
- 2017 inductee – Sports Broadcasting Hall of Fame

== Career timeline ==
- 1979–present: SportsCenter anchor (occasionally since 1990)
- 1985–2016: Sunday NFL Countdown host
- 1985–2016: NFL draft host
- 1986–2014: U.S. Open nightly show host
- 1987–2005, 2019–present: NFL Primetime host (Postgame host during playoffs, 2017–present)
- 1987–2005: ESPN Sunday Night Football halftime host
- 1990–2016: Baseball Tonight host (occasional)
- 1990–2016: MLB on ESPN play-by-play (selected games)
- 1986–2016: Home Run Derby play-by-play
- 1996–1999, 2006–2016, and during NFL playoff between 1998 and 2005: Monday Night Football halftime host
- 1999–present: Master of Ceremonies for the Pro Football Hall of Fame induction
- 2003–2014: U.S. Open host
- 2003: NHL on ESPN and NHL on ABC studio co-host (Stanley Cup Finals)
- 2006–2016: Monday Night Countdown host
- 2012–2016: ESPN Monday Night Football No. 2 play-by-play
- 2017–present: Monday Night Countdown panelist
- 2020–present: Monday Night Football halftime studio co-host

== See also ==
- You're with me, leather
