= ESPN Sunday Night Football =

- Also known as: ESPN Sunday Night NFL (1987–1997)
- Genre: American football game telecasts
- Presented by: Chris Berman; Tom Jackson
- Starring: Mike Patrick; Joe Theismann; Paul Maguire; Suzy Kolber see below
- Country of origin: United States
- Original language: English
- No. of seasons: 19 (through 2005 season)

Production
- Production locations: Various NFL stadiums (game telecasts)
- Camera setup: Multi-camera
- Running time: 210 minutes or until game ends (inc. adverts)
- Production companies: National Football League; ESPN

Original release
- Network: ESPN
- Release: November 8, 1987 – January 1, 2006

Related
- NFL on ESPN; NFL on TNT; ABC Monday Night Football; NFL Primetime

ESPN Sunday Night Football was the ESPN cable network's weekly television broadcasts of Sunday evening National Football League (NFL) games. The first ESPN Sunday night broadcast occurred on November 8, 1987, while the last one aired on January 1, 2006.

Former NFL Commissioner Paul Tagliabue credits ESPN with raising the "profile" of the league, by turning "a potential six- or seven-hour television experience into a twelve-hour television experience," factoring in both Sunday Night Football and the network's pregame show Sunday NFL Countdown.

== History ==
Former logo used from 1989 to 1994

While ABC had been airing occasional Sunday night NFL games (usually one per season) under its Monday Night Football banner since 1978, the concept of playing a regular series of Sunday night professional football games on ESPN was originally a concept designed for the United States Football League (USFL). As part of the abortive 1986 USFL season, ESPN was to carry a weekly Sunday night game throughout the fall season.

As part of its new television package in 1987, the NFL granted ESPN the rights to air a series of Sunday night games, which were to air over the second half of the regular season. The NFL thus became the last major North American professional sports league to begin airing its games on cable television. However, the games were typically simulcast on regular over-the-air television stations in each participating team's local market, so that households without cable television could still see the telecasts of their local team.

During the inaugural season of ESPN Sunday Night NFL (as the telecast was then branded) in 1987, the network's announcing booth consisted of Mike Patrick, Roy Firestone, and a weekly "guest color commentator". Joe Theismann took over as lead analyst beginning in 1988.

During the first season, the game between the New York Giants and New England Patriots (the first regular season game aired by ESPN) saw WABC-TV (ABC's flagship station out of New York City) produce a completely separate telecast from ESPN's. The reason behind this was that WABC's union contract at the time prohibited non-union workers, such as those at ESPN, from producing live events for WABC. The WABC broadcasts involved play-by-play man (and WABC-TV sports director) Corey McPherrin and Frank Gifford and Lynn Swann (from Monday Night Football) on color commentary.

In 1990, the NFL expanded its Sunday night offerings to the full season, with TNT airing games in the season's first half and ESPN taking over for the second half. Beginning in 1998, ESPN broadcast the entire slate of Sunday night games (now officially rebranded as ESPN Sunday Night Football), and had exclusive rights to any night game other than the season opener and regular Monday night games, which aired on ABC. Thus, ESPN would usually have a few weekends each season with games on both Saturday (sometimes Thursday instead) and Sunday nights. During this period, Major League Baseball would typically hold Game 2 of the World Series on a Sunday night, and in deference the NFL would schedule TNT's and later ESPN's game that weekend for Thursday instead.

Also in 1998, Paul Maguire joined Patrick and Theismann in the booth after re-joining ESPN after several years as a color commentator for NBC. Beginning in 1999, Suzy Kolber, who had recently rejoined ESPN from Fox Sports, served as the sideline reporter; Kolber replaced Solomon Wilcots, who joined CBS as a color commentator. In 2002, ESPN's SNF crew covered the new Thursday, opening night kickoff game. In 2004, Pat Summerall replaced Patrick for the preseason and for several regular season weeks following Patrick's recovery from open-heart surgery.

After the 2005 season, ESPN ended this package in favor of picking up the broadcast rights to Monday Night Football from ABC. NBC picked up the rights to ESPN's Sunday night games. To replace Sunday Night Football ESPN moved its late-season Sunday Night Baseball broadcasts back to the network and replaced most of the rest of the open weeks with NBA telecasts.

=== Music ===
From 1987–1997, ESPN used various themes for its NFL coverage, reflecting its separate management from sister company ABC Sports (now ESPN on ABC since September 2006) at the time.

In 1998, as Disney began consolidating ESPN and ABC Sports, ESPN's NFL coverage began using themes associated with Monday Night Football such as "Heavy Action" and an amended version of its Hank Williams Jr. theme. In-game use of these themes ended after 2000, in favor of another original theme also referred to as "Sirens" (for featuring sirens prominently) by The Herbaliser.

When ESPN gained the Monday night games, they once again began using the traditional Monday Night Football themes, but with increased frequency.

=== Significant games ===
- First preseason game: Chicago Bears at Miami Dolphins, August 13, 1987
- First regular season game: New England Patriots at New York Giants, November 8, 1987 (Giants won, 17–10)
- First telecast during opening week of season: Oakland Raiders at Kansas City Chiefs, September 6, 1998 (Chiefs won, 28–8)
- First regular season game outside the U.S.: San Francisco 49ers vs. Arizona Cardinals at Estadio Azteca in Mexico City, Mexico, October 2, 2005 (Cardinals won 31–14; see also: Fútbol Americano)
- Last telecast: St. Louis Rams at Dallas Cowboys, January 1, 2006 (Rams won, 21–10)

==== Joe Namath incident ====
During a game between the New England Patriots at New York Jets on December 20, 2003, former Jets quarterback Joe Namath participated in a sideline interview with Suzy Kolber. Namath had been drinking alcohol all day, and was moving around and slurring his speech. On live television, Namath twice stated that he wanted to kiss Kolber, and answered questions in a clumsy and awkward way; at the time, Kolber thought that the cold weather explained his behavior. The interview went viral and quotes from it were used in a song by Steve Porter. Namath later apologized and blamed the incident on his intoxication. Soon after, Namath entered an outpatient alcoholism treatment program. Namath chronicled the episode, including his battle with alcoholism, in his book, Namath (ISBN 0-67003-329-4).

== Commentators ==
=== Play-by-play announcers ===
- Mike Patrick (1987–2005)
- Pat Summerall (fill-in, 2004)
- Mike Tirico: (#2, 2005)

NOTE: Pat Summerall filled in for Mike Patrick who was recovering from heart bypass surgery.

=== Color commentators ===
- Roy Firestone (1987)
- Joe Theismann (1988–2005)
- Paul Maguire (1998–2005)
- Sterling Sharpe: (#2, 2005)

=== Sideline reporters ===
- Mark Malone (1994–1996)
- Ron Jaworski (1997)
- Solomon Wilcots (1998–2000)
- Suzy Kolber (2001–2005)

=== Studio hosts ===
- Chris Berman (1987–2005)

=== Studio analysts ===
- Pete Axthelm (1987)
- Tom Jackson (1987–2005)

=== Guest commentators (1987 only) ===
- Larry Csonka (twice)
- John Matuszak (twice)
- Roger Staubach
- Jim Brown
- Ed Marinaro
- Tom Jackson
- O. J. Simpson
- Jack Reynolds
- Dick Butkus

Records
Preceded by ABC (occasional Thursday, Friday, Saturday and Sunday night games)	NFL Sunday night broadcaster 1987–2005 (with TNT from 1990–1997)	Succeeded by NBC
