= Suzy Kolber =

American football sideline reporter, co-producer, and sportscaster

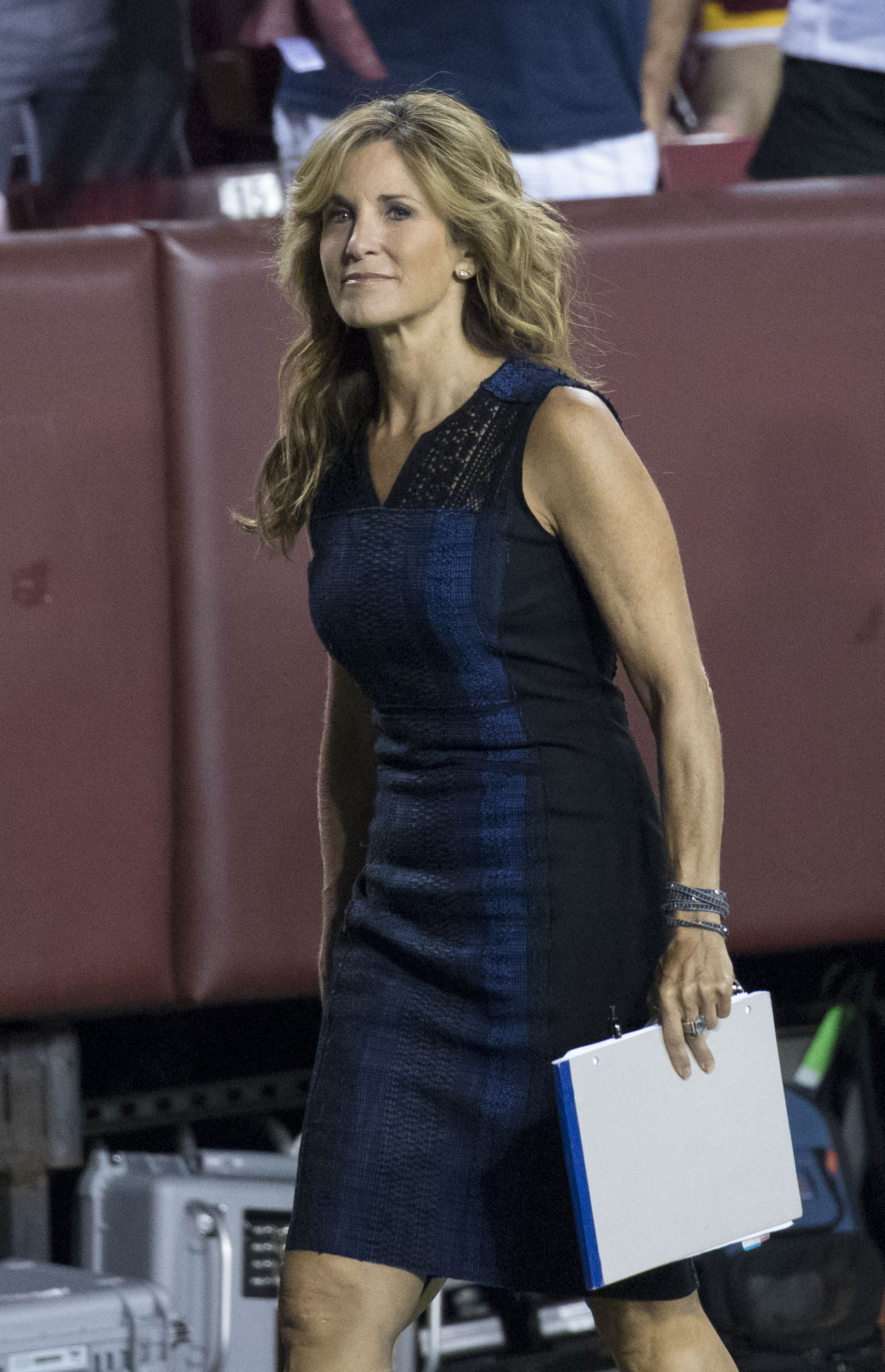
- Kolber in 2016
- Born: 1963 or 1964 (age 62–63); Dresher, Pennsylvania, U.S.
- Education: University of Miami
- Occupations: Anchor; reporter

Suzy Kolber (born 1963 or 1964) is an American sports journalist. She was one of the original anchors of ESPN2 when it launched in 1993. Three years later, she left ESPN2 to join Fox Sports but returned to ESPN in late 1999 until 2023.

== Early life ==
Kolber was born and raised in a Jewish family in Dresher, Pennsylvania. She attended Upper Dublin High School, graduating in 1982.

Kolber is a graduate of the University of Miami. As a student, she worked at Dynamic Cable in Coral Gables, Florida, where she was a sports director from 1984 to 1986, and was on the University of Miami water ski team.

== Career ==
=== CBS Sports ===
After graduation, she worked at CBS Sports in New York City as a videotape coordinator in 1986.

=== WTVJ and WPEC ===
Kolber produced the 5:30 p.m. sportscast at WTVJ-TV in Miami from 1985 to 1989, eventually winning a local Sports Emmy in 1988.

From 1989 to 1990, she freelanced as a specials producer for WPLG-TV in Miami. In addition, she produced two magazine shows, Greyhound Racing America in Miami, Florida (1988–90) and Cowboys Special Edition in Irving, Texas (1990–91).

In 1991, Kolber's freelance assignments included work as a reporter/producer for Breeders' Cup Newsfeed in Greenwich, Connecticut; a field producer for Inside Edition in New York City; a sports specials producer for WCIX-TV in Miami, and a producer/director for NFL Films.

She was a weekend sports anchor and weekday feature reporter at WPEC-TV in West Palm Beach, Florida from December 1991 until she moved to ESPN in 1993.

=== ESPN ===
Kolber previously covered a variety of assignments for ESPN from the National Football League to the 1996 ESPN X Games bicycle-stunt events and Grand Slam tennis events. She was a sideline reporter on ESPN’s Monday Night Football with Michele Tafoya.

In 2007, she hosted ESPN’s pre-race NASCAR Countdown program.

Kolber joined ESPN’s MNF team during its inaugural year in 2006 after five previous seasons on ESPN's Sunday Night Football (2001–05). As a member of the MNF team, Kolber helped the longtime franchise become the most-watched program in cable television history.

Kolber worked the ABC Sports broadcast of Super Bowl XL in Detroit in 2006 with Michele Tafoya and contributed to the network’s pre-game show. She became the first female recipient of the Maxwell Club Sports Broadcaster of the Year Award in 2006 and was named to Sports Business Daily's 2004 list of the 10 favorite sports TV personalities of the past 10 years. Kolber hosted ESPN’s year-round NFL Live news and information show, and she played a role in ESPN’s comprehensive coverage of the annual NFL draft, hosting the Day 2 telecast from 2004 to 2006, and leading analysis segments on Day 1. For the 1999 through 2003 NFL seasons, Kolber hosted NFL Matchup. She also previously contributed “Backstage” segments to Monday Night Countdown.

During the NFL off-season, Kolber served as an anchor on SportsCenter and as an on-site and studio host for ESPN's tennis coverage at the French Open from 2004 to 2006) and Wimbledon from 2003 to 2006 and in 2009.

In 1996, 2000, and 2001, she hosted the Summer X Games and Winter X Games, and co-hosted the event again in Aspen in 2006. She hosted horse racing events, including all three legs of the Triple Crown for ESPN and ESPN2 studio programs.

=== Fox Sports ===
Kolber left ESPN for Fox Sports in November 1996, where she anchored Fox Sports News for Fox Sports Net and reported from NFL games. She was the lead reporter for the network's coverage of the NFL on Fox teaming up with the network's No. 1 announcer team of Pat Summerall and John Madden for one game in 1998. She also covered horse racing. She served as studio host for the network's coverage of the NHL on Fox, including both the 1999 Stanley Cup Finals and the Playoffs.

In March 1999, Kolber co-hosted a Fox non-sports presentation with Maury Povich, Opening the Lost Tombs: Live From Egypt, an archaeological event that promised to "unveil five-thousand year old mysteries." Fox's TV cameras showed the first live excavation of Egypt's ancient Giza plateau; Kolber reported live from the tomb. She returned to ESPN in August 1999.

=== Return to ESPN ===
Kolber returned to ESPN in August 1999 after originally joining the network in 1993 as co-host for ESPN2's SportsNight, when the network debuted October 1 of that year. She later served as an anchor on SportsCenter, a reporter on College GameDay, and co-host of the X Games in 1995 and 1996. Kolber also hosted ESPN2's SportsFigures, which uses sports celebrities and analogies to teach math and physics.

While covering the 2011 NFL draft, Kolber came under fire for her interview with Mark Ingram II, who started to sob when Kolber read an e-mail from Ingram's imprisoned father. The interview was perceived by some as being manipulative.

On September 13, 2011, ESPN2 debuted NFL32, co-hosted by Kolber and Chris Mortensen. With a backdrop similar to a sports bar, including wainscoting, sports memorabilia, and dark woodwork, the show focuses on "dissect the biggest topics of the day from all 32 NFL teams," according to the network, and attributes much of its design to that of the Dan Patrick Show, a national radio and television show on DirecTV's Audience network.

==== Monday Night Football ====
Kolber joined ESPN's Monday Night Football crew as a sideline reporter along with Michele Tafoya when the network took over the longtime football series from ABC Sports in 2006. After Tafoya left ESPN for NBC Sports at the end of the 2010 NFL season, ESPN used a rotating solo sideline reporter for the 2011 NFL season, with reporters Wendi Nix, Ed Werder, and Rachel Nichols stepping into the role each week, and Kolber used as a fill-in. Kolber requested to do more in-studio work so she didn't have to be away from her child.

The show, NFL32, now called NFL Insiders, was created as a result of this request. Lisa Salters was named the new full-time solo sideline reporter for Monday Night Football starting with the 2012 NFL season, effectively ending Kolber's tenure as sideline reporter for the show, although both Salters and Kolber continued to co-produce the show in some capacity.

==== NASCAR Countdown ====
On the week of the race on May 19, Kolber was announced as the new host of Nextel Cup and Busch Series studio programming. She was subsequently replaced by Allen Bestwick as host of NASCAR Countdown in 2008.

==== Monday Night Countdown ====
After substituting for the then-ailing Stuart Scott during most of the 2014 NFL season, Kolber took over Scott's role permanently as an on-site host of Monday Night Countdown, starting with the 2015 NFL season, after Scott died in January 2015.

==== Termination ====
Kolber was among 20 on-air employees ESPN laid off during cost cutting in June 2023.

=== Scripps Sports ===
In 2026, Kolber began hosting an interview show for Scripps Sports called The Originals.

=== Endorsements ===
Kolber's football broadcast narrative is featured on Sega's video game, ESPN NFL Football for Microsoft's Xbox and Sony's PlayStation 2.

In 1995's ESPN Extreme Games for PlayStation, she has multiple video sequences hyping up the player, introducing levels, and hinting at secret areas. The re-release of the game, 1Xtreme, removed all of her videos, and any reference to ESPN.
