= Katie Feeney =

American social media personality

- Feeney in 2022
- Born: Katherine Feeney; August 16, 2002 (age 24); Olney, Maryland, U.S.
- Education: Pennsylvania State University
- Years active: 2021–present
- Employer: ESPN

TikTok information
- Page: Katie Feeney
- Followers: 7.6 million

YouTube information
- Channel: Katie Feeney
- Genre: Shorts
- Subscribers: 3.76 million
- Views: 5.33 billion
- Last updated: July 25, 2026

Katherine Feeney (born August 16, 2002) is an American social media personality with over 13 million followers across TikTok, YouTube, Instagram and Snapchat.

== Early life ==
Before her social media career, she had been competitively dancing since the age of four.

== Career ==
Feeney first began posting to TikTok when it was still known as Musical.ly in 2015. She continued to create content throughout high school, amassing 2 million TikTok followers when the COVID-19 pandemic started in 2020. During the pandemic, she began posting videos on the growth of sea monkeys and unboxing videos. In February 2021, she gained national attention when she made over one million dollars using Snapchat's "Spotlight" feature within six weeks of posting content, something that had never been done before in Snapchat's history.

On April 13, 2022, Feeney was hired as the social media correspondent for the NFL's Washington Commanders. As part of the partnership, Feeney provides exclusive team coverage to her followers, with the goal of connecting them and other fans to the organization. During the 2022 NFL season, she covered the draft party, rookie minicamp, training camp, media day, and select home games.

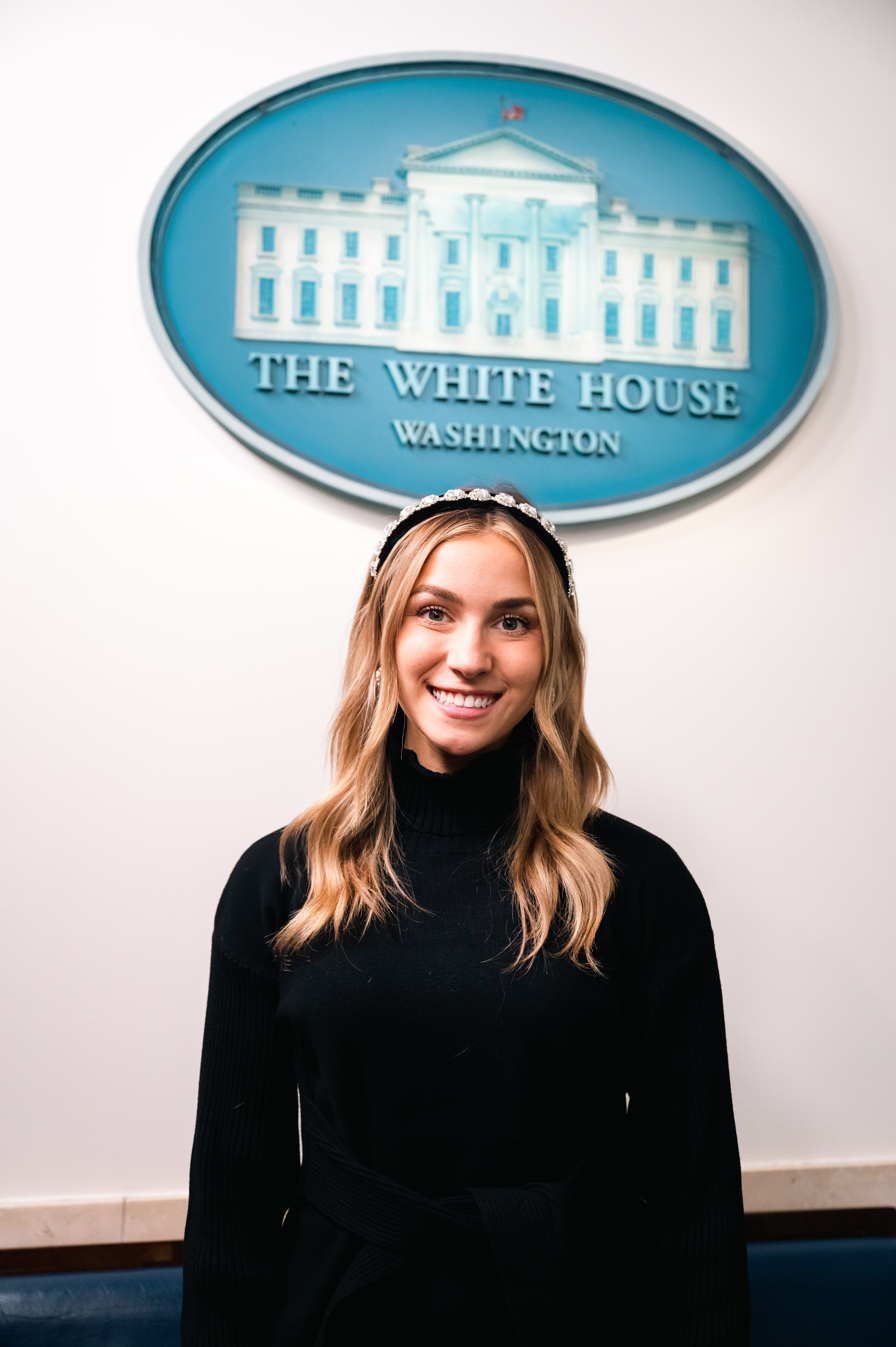
Feeney at the White House in 2022

On November 28, 2022, Feeney was hired as the first fully credentialed White House social media correspondent for AKSM Media. Feeney provided followers with coverage of White House events, as well as expanding White House reporting via social media. AKSM's goal is for Feeney to connect a younger audience to the White House and limit the spread of misinformation on social media. On her first day on the job, she began posting content covering First Lady Jill Biden's 2022 Christmas decorations at the White House.

On August 4, 2025, Feeney joined ESPN as a “Sports and Lifestyle Content Creator”. She will contribute to the network’s social media platforms and appear on Sunday NFL Countdown, Monday Night Countdown, and College GameDay.
