= Paul Maguire =

American football player and sportscaster (born 1938)

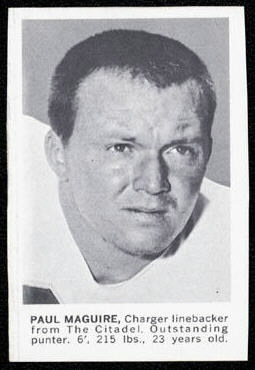
- Maguire as a San Diego Charger in 1961

No. 84, 55
- Positions: Punter, linebacker

Personal information
- Born: August 22, 1938 (age 88); Youngstown, Ohio, U.S.
- Listed height: 6 ft 0 in (1.83 m)
- Listed weight: 228 lb (103 kg)

Career information
- College: The Citadel
- AFL draft: 1960

Career history
- Los Angeles / San Diego Chargers (1960–1963); Buffalo Bills (1964–1970)

Awards and highlights
- 3× AFL champion (1963, 1964, 1965); 2× AFL All-Star (1963, 1965); 3× AFL punting yards leader (1962, 1968, 1969); Third-team All-American (1959); 1960 Copper Bowl All-Star Game; AFL records: Most career punts: 712; Most career punting yards: 29,909

Career statistics
- Interceptions: 9
- Punts: 795
- Punting yards: 33,137
- Punting average: 41.7
- Longest punt: 82
- Stats at Pro Football Reference

Paul Leo Maguire (born August 22, 1938) is an American former professional football player and television sportscaster. He played as a punter and linebacker in the American Football League (AFL) and National Football League (NFL).

== Early sports career ==
Maguire attended Ursuline High School in Youngstown, Ohio where he was an All State wide receiver and punter; he also played basketball and ran track. He played tight end at The Citadel where he led the nation in touchdown receptions his senior season in 1959 and was named a 3rd Team Associated Press All American; he was recruited by Assistant Coach Al Davis, the future Oakland Raiders owner.

== Professional football career ==
In 1960, Maguire was selected by the Los Angeles Chargers of the American Football League, where he served as both a punter and linebacker. He moved with the team to San Diego in 1961, and stayed there until 1964 when he joined the Buffalo Bills. Maguire was an ace at the "coffin corner" punt. He contributed to three Bills' Eastern Division titles, and their AFL championships in 1964 and 1965. In the 1964 AFL Championship game he kicked a 78-yard punt that went out of bounds at the San Diego 2 yard line with 2 minutes left in the game that sealed the victory for the Bills. In the 1965 championship game he was involved in one of the most spectacular plays in Bills' history in the 1965 American Football League Championship game against the Chargers. Butch Byrd took a John Hadl punt and with outstanding blocking, took it 74 yards for a touchdown. The last two blocks were by Maguire, crushing two Chargers.

Maguire played in six of the ten American Football League Championship Games — three with the Chargers and three with the Bills, winning three AFL Championship rings, and he was the league's all-time punter in punts (712) and yardage (29,909). His 795 punts were the most in pro football history when he retired in 1970. He was one of only twenty players who were in the AFL for its entire ten-year existence. After his retirement he was inducted into the Youngstown, Ohio Sports Hall of Fame, and the Greater Buffalo Sports Hall of Fame.

== Media career ==
Beginning in the 1970s, Maguire worked as a color commentator on network NFL telecasts, first with NBC and then ESPN. He also called ESPN's telecasts of college football, the Canadian Football League and the now-defunct USFL. Maguire re-joined NBC in 1986 as an analyst on their pregame show, then becoming a color commentator in 1988. Maguire most often worked with Marv Albert on NBC's #2 broadcast team for his first seven seasons working for NBC. In 1995, Maguire and then-ESPN reporter Phil Simms joined Dick Enberg as the #1 broadcast team for NBC, and remained paired until the end of the 1997 season, when NBC lost the rights to the NFL.

Maguire rejoined ESPN for the 1998 season and became a second color commentator for Sunday Night Football. While there he also served as a color commentator for ABC's Wild Card Saturday games, as the Sunday Night Football team would (usually) broadcast the early game of the day. During the time he was at ESPN, Maguire called playoff games for ABC every year except for 2002, when the network elected to use Brent Musburger and Gary Danielson, its lead college football broadcast team, on Wild Card Saturday.

In 1991, Maguire participated in the WrestleMania VII event.

Maguire, who had a residence in Buffalo after his playing days, hosted a locally produced call-in show called the "Budweiser Sportsline". Later the program was broadcast on the Empire Sports Network.

Maguire worked his last regular season NFL game on January 1, 2006, when the St. Louis Rams and Dallas Cowboys played on ESPN's final Sunday night broadcast. His final NFL game altogether came on January 7, 2006, when he worked the Washington Redskins-Tampa Bay Buccaneers opening round playoff game. However, Maguire was retained by ESPN to serve as a commentator for ABC's college football with Brad Nessler, former Miami Dolphins quarterback Bob Griese, and field reporter Bonnie Bernstein.

In March 2007, Maguire began to serve as an in-studio analyst for ESPN's NFL Live.

Maguire did not return to broadcasting for the 2009 college football season when his broadcast team was split up, with Nessler moving to Saturday night games on ESPN with Todd Blackledge and Griese moving to noon games on ESPN alongside Dave Pasch and Chris Spielman. He later (2009–2010) broadcast games for the then-new United Football League on HDNet, a cable network and streaming service.

== See also ==
- List of American Football League players

Preceded by Bob Trumpy	NFL on NBC lead analyst (with Phil Simms); 1995-1997	Succeeded by John Madden (in 2006)
Preceded by Bob Trumpy	Super Bowl television color commentator (AFC package carrier); 1995-1997 (with Phil Simms)	Succeeded by Phil Simms
