= Sunday NFL Countdown =

- Former logo used from 2006 to 2013
- Also known as: NFL GameDay (1985–1995); NFL Countdown (1996–1997)
- Genre: Pre-game show
- Presented by: Mike Greenberg; Rex Ryan; Randy Moss; Alex Smith; Tedy Bruschi; Adam Schefter; Katie Feeney
- Country of origin: United States
- Original language: English
- No. of seasons: 42 (through 2026 season)

Production
- Production locations: ABC and ESPN Studio; 7 Hudson Square, Manhattan, New York City
- Camera setup: Multi-camera
- Running time: 180 minutes
- Production companies: National Football League; ESPN

Original release
- Network: ESPN
- Release: September 7, 1985 – present

Related
- NFL on ESPN

Sunday NFL Countdown (branded as Sunday NFL Countdown presented by Snickers for sponsorship reasons) is an American pre-game show broadcast by ESPN as part of the network's coverage of the National Football League. The program is broadcast on Sunday mornings throughout the regular season, featuring segments highlighting news from around the league, as well as previews and analysis of the day's games. The program debuted as NFL GameDay on September 7, 1985, then was renamed as NFL Countdown in 1996, and Sunday NFL Countdown in 1998 to disambiguate it from its Monday night counterpart Monday Night Countdown. During the NFL playoffs, editions of the show (along with Monday Night Countdown) are titled as Postseason NFL Countdown.

== Format and history ==
It is very similar to The NFL Today on CBS and Fox NFL Sunday, which airs on Fox. The show's former names include NFL GameDay from 1985 to 1995, NFL Countdown from 1996 to 1997, and since 1998, Sunday NFL Countdown (to demarcate from the Monday night version of the series). In 2006, the program introduced new graphics and a new logo to resemble the network's Monday Night Football logo.

Chris Berman was the studio host from 1986 to 2016, succeeding Bob Ley. Jack Youngblood was the first analyst. In 1987, he was replaced by Pete Axthelm and Tom Jackson.

The show's awards include seven Sports Emmy Awards for Outstanding Weekly Show (1988, 1991, 1994, 1995, 2001, 2003, and 2006 seasons) and five CableACE Awards (1989, 1992, 1993, 1994, and 1995 seasons).

In February 2007, ESPN confirmed an earlier report in the Dallas Morning News that Michael Irvin would not be brought back to the show or to the network. On March 12, ESPN confirmed on its website that Michael Irvin's former teammate, Emmitt Smith would fill Irvin's chair, but that arrangement only lasted one season. Keyshawn Johnson also joined the network and has served as an analyst for Countdown, among other programs.

On September 7, 2014, which was the 35th anniversary of ESPN's launch, Sunday NFL Countdown debuted a brand-new studio inside Digital Center 2 of ESPN's main facilities in Bristol. With it, came a new logo and also, a new graphics package similar to that of SportsCenter. Like SportsCenter, a Helvetica font is used, but with the lower-thirds having white text on a black background, as opposed to black text on a white background. Starting September 8, every NFL show produced at ESPN now shares its new graphics, new logo, and a new set (except Monday Night Countdown, which itself shares the same graphics package and theme music as Monday Night Football).

On September 13, 2015, Sunday NFL Countdown was shortened from 3 hours to 2 hours, due to a new Sunday edition of NFL Insiders being aired in the 10 a.m. to 11 a.m. ET time slot. Therefore, Sunday NFL Countdown was moved down an hour to 11 a.m. ET. On September 10, 2017, Sunday NFL Countdown moved back to the 10 a.m. ET time slot and became a 3-hour program once again, resulting in the cancellation of NFL Insiders: Sunday Edition after 2 seasons.

The show usually originates from Bristol, but it originates in the city hosting the Super Bowl for its Super Bowl edition. On November 20, 2016, the show originated from Mexico City, which was hosting the Monday Night Football game the following night between the Houston Texans and Oakland Raiders. In January 2017, ESPN announced that Berman would leave the show at the end of the 2016–17 season, ending his 31-year tenure as host of this program. Berman was replaced with Sam Ponder, who had previously co-hosted and contributed to College GameDay from 2012 to 2016.

On September 13, 2020, Sunday NFL Countdown moved from Bristol to the network's South Street Seaport studios in New York City. Its sister Monday night show followed the next day. Both Sunday NFL Countdown and Monday Night Countdown now share the same studio with another ESPN show, First Take. Monday Night Countdown went back on the road in 2021, but still aired from Seaport occasionally. Sunday NFL Countdown moved back to Bristol during the 2023 season after ESPN started scaling back on production at Seaport. Monday Night Countdown followed suit for select weeks including doubleheader weeks. In 2025, the show was moved to the new Disney/ABC 7 Hudson Square studio complex in New York City, where it broadcasts from the set used during the week by Live With Kelly and Mark.

On August 20, 2024, ESPN named Mike Greenberg, host of the network's weekday morning show, Get Up, as the new host of Sunday NFL Countdown. He replaced Samantha Ponder (the show's previous host), who, along with Robert Griffin III, were both terminated from ESPN earlier that month.

=== Controversy ===
On July 14, 2003, ESPN announced that Rush Limbaugh would be joining the show as a weekly commentator when it premiered on September 7. Limbaugh would provide the "voice of the fan" and was supposed to spark debate on the show. On September 28, Limbaugh commented about Donovan McNabb, the quarterback of the Philadelphia Eagles:

"Sorry to say this, I don't think he's been that good from the get-go. I think what we've had here is a little social concern in the NFL. The media has been very desirous that a black quarterback do well. There is a little hope invested in McNabb, and he got a lot of credit for the performance of this team that he didn't deserve. The defense carried this team."

On October 1, 2003, less than one week after that comment, Limbaugh resigned from ESPN. The following Sunday on air Tom Jackson said about Limbaugh:

"Let me just say that it was not our decision to have Rush Limbaugh on this show. I've seen replay after replay of Limbaugh's comments with my face attached as well as that of my colleagues, comments which made us very uncomfortable at the time, although the depth and the insensitive nature of which weren't fully felt until it seemed too late to reply. He was brought here to talk football, and he broke that trust. Rush told us the social commentary for which he is so well known would not cross over to our show, and instead, he would represent the viewpoint of the intelligent, passionate fan. Rush Limbaugh was not a fit for NFL Countdown."

== Personalities ==
=== Current ===
==== Main Panelists ====
- Mike Greenberg: (Host, 2024–present)
- Rex Ryan: (Analyst, 2017–present)
- Randy Moss: (Analyst, 2016–present)
- Alex Smith: (Analyst, 2023–present)
- Tedy Bruschi: (Analyst, 2019–present)

==== Field Reporters ====
- Jeff Darlington: (Correspondent, 2016–present)
- Dan Graziano: (Correspondent, 2017–present)
- Kimberley A. Martin: (Correspondent, 2020–present)
- Sal Paolantonio: (Correspondent, 1995–present)
- Lindsey Thiry: (Correspondent, 2023–present)

==== NFL Insiders ====
- Adam Schefter: (2009–present)

==== Contributors ====
- Katie Feeney: (Contributor, 2025–present)

=== Former ===
- Josina Anderson: (Correspondent, 2011–2019)
- Pete Axthelm: (analyst, 1987–1990)
- Chris Berman: (studio host, 1986–2016)
- Frank Caliendo: (contributor, 2012–2018)
- Cris Carter: (analyst, 2008–2015)
- Trent Dilfer: (analyst, 2016)
- Mike Ditka: (analyst, 2006–2015)
- Josh Elliott: (correspondent, 2006–2010)
- Greg Garber: (correspondent, 1991–2017)
- Matt Hasselbeck: (analyst, 2016–2022)
- Merril Hoge: (analyst, 2012–2014)
- Michael Irvin: (analyst, 2003–2006)
- Tom Jackson: (analyst, 1987–2015)
- Ron Jaworski: (contributor, 1990–2005) (analyst, 2006; 2012–2014)
- Keyshawn Johnson (analyst, 2007–2015)
- Jim Kelly: (analyst, 1998–2000)
- Andrea Kremer: (contributor, 1989–2005)
- Ray Lewis: (analyst, 2013–2015)
- Bob Ley: (studio host, 1985)
- Rush Limbaugh: (analyst, 2003)
- Kenny Mayne: (contributor, 2005–2012)
- Tom Mees: (studio host, 1986)
- Chris Mortensen: (insider, 1991–2022)
- Wendi Nix: (co-host, 2014–2016)
- Pam Oliver: (reporter, 1993–1994)
- Bill Parcells: (contributor, 2007)
- Samantha Ponder: (Host, 2017–2023)
- Louis Riddick: (contributor, 2017–2018)
- Dianna Russini: (Correspondent, 2017–2022)
- Phil Simms: (analyst, 1994)
- Stuart Scott: (co-host, 1999–2000)
- Sterling Sharpe: (analyst, 1995–2003)
- Emmitt Smith: (analyst, 2007)
- Joe Theismann: (analyst, 1988–1997)
- Jim Trotter: (correspondent, 2014–2017)
- Mike Tirico: (co-host, 1998)
- Ed Werder: (correspondent, 1998–2016; 2019–2023)
- Charles Woodson: (analyst, 2016–2018)
- Steve Young: (analyst, 2000–2005) (contributor, 2006–2009)
- Jack Youngblood: (analyst, 1985–1986)

== See also ==
- Monday Night Football
- Monday Night Countdown
- NFL Insiders
- NFL Live
- NFL Matchup
- NFL Primetime
