= Ryan Clark (American football) =

American football player (born 1979)

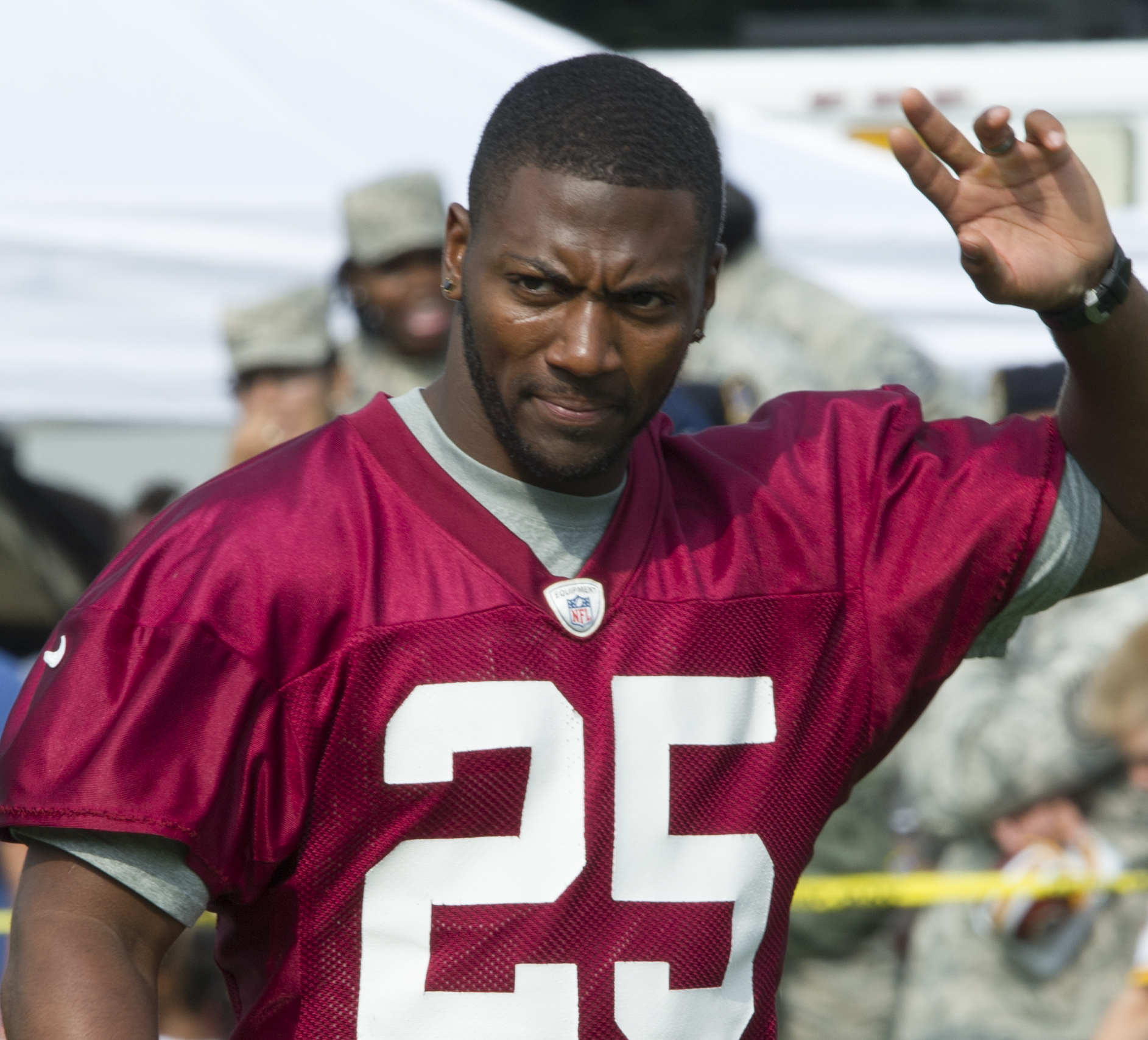
- Clark with Washington in 2014

No. 39, 25
- Position: Safety

Personal information
- Born: October 12, 1979 (age 47); Marrero, Louisiana, U.S.
- Listed height: 5 ft 11 in (1.80 m)
- Listed weight: 205 lb (93 kg)

Career information
- High school: Archbishop Shaw (Marrero, Louisiana)
- College: LSU (1997–2001)
- NFL draft: 2002: undrafted

Career history
- New York Giants (2002–2003); Washington Redskins (2004–2005); Pittsburgh Steelers (2006–2013); Washington Redskins (2014)

Awards and highlights
- Super Bowl champion (XLIII); Pro Bowl (2011)

Career NFL statistics
- Tackles: 651
- Sacks: 4.0
- Interceptions: 16
- Forced fumbles: 4
- Stats at Pro Football Reference

Ryan Terry Clark (born October 12, 1979) is an American former professional football player who was a safety in the National Football League (NFL). He played college football for the LSU Tigers, and was signed by the New York Giants as an undrafted free agent in 2002. Clark also played for the Pittsburgh Steelers and for the Washington Redskins. He won a Super Bowl ring with the Steelers in Super Bowl XLIII, and made a Pro Bowl in 2011.

Clark has a sickle cell trait condition which made it dangerous for him to play at high altitudes, such as in Denver, Colorado.

== Early life ==
Clark was born in Marrero, Louisiana. In 1997 he graduated from Archbishop Shaw High School.

== College career ==
At Louisiana State University, Clark started 36 consecutive games for the LSU Tigers football team. In 2000, he was selected to the All-SEC second team by the league's coaches. Clark ranked third on the Tigers in 2001 with 88 tackles, including 63 solo, and also intercepted three passes. He recorded five tackles, including a 13-yard sack, in the Sugar Bowl and was LSU's Special Teams Player of the Year in 1998. While at LSU, he joined the Nu Iota chapter of Kappa Alpha Psi fraternity.

== Professional career ==
=== New York Giants ===
==== 2002 ====
Clark went undrafted in the 2002 NFL draft. On April 26, 2002, the New York Giants signed Clark to a three-year, $906,000 contract as an undrafted free agent that included a signing bonus of $1,000.

During training camp, Clark delivered a late hit to teammate and rookie wide receiver Tim Carter that sidelined the second round pick for six weeks. Head coach Jim Fassel named Clark a backup safety and a part of the special teams unit to begin his rookie season. Clark made his professional regular season debut during the New York Giants' 16–13 loss against the San Francisco 49ers. The following week, Clark made his first career tackle as the Giants defeated the St. Louis Rams 26–21. On October 21, 2002, the New York Giants released Clark and replaced him with veteran safety Johnnie Harris. On October 23, 2002, the New York Giants signed Clark to their practice squad where he would remain for the rest of his rookie season.

==== 2003 ====
Throughout training camp in 2003, Clark competed for a roster spot against Shaun Williams and Ike Charlton. Head coach Jim Fassel named Clark the primary backup safety to begin the regular season, behind starters Shaun Williams and Omar Stoutmire. On October 19, 2003, Clark earned his first career start and deflected a single pass during a 14–10 loss against the Philadelphia Eagles in Week 7. In Week 12, he collected a season-high five solo tackles as the Giants lost 19–13 at the Tampa Bay Buccaneers. On December 28, 2003, Clark recorded three solo tackles and made his first career sack during a 37–24 loss against the Carolina Panthers in Week 17. Clark sacked Panthers' quarterback Jake Delhomme for a seven-yard loss in the third quarter. Clark finished the 2003 NFL season with 21 combined tackles (19 solo), two pass deflections, and one sack in 16 games and four starts.

On May 28, 2004, the New York Giants waived Clark after signing free agent safety Brent Alexander.

=== Washington Redskins (first stint) ===
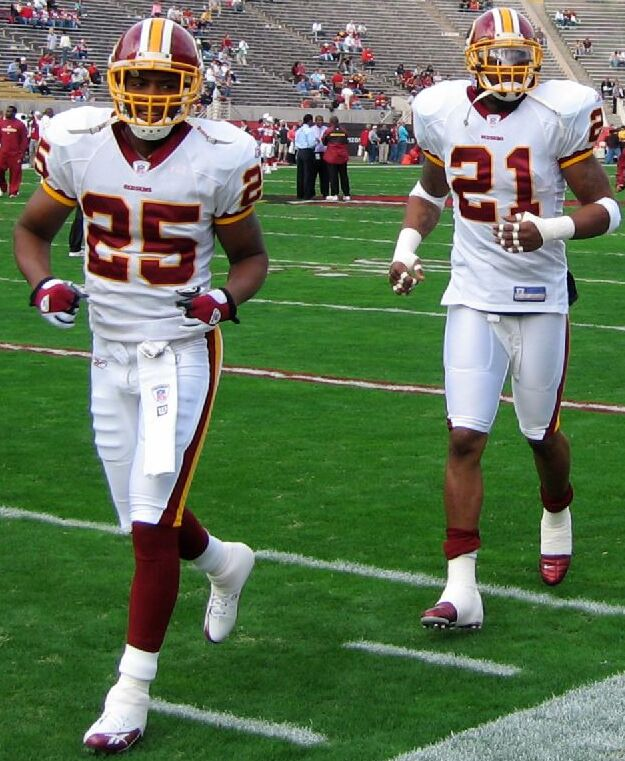
Clark (left) and Sean Taylor (right) both joined Washington in 2004, and would be their starting safeties in 2005

==== 2004 ====
On July 31, 2004, the Washington Redskins signed Clark to a two-year, $835,000 contract as an unrestricted free agent. Head coach Joe Gibbs named Clark a backup safety behind Matt Bowen, Andre Lott, and rookie Sean Taylor. In Week 6, Clark became the starting free safety, alongside strong safety Sean Taylor, after season-ending injuries sidelined Matt Bowen and Andre Lott. On November 14, 2004, Clark collected a season-high 11 combined tackles (ten solo) during a 17–10 loss to the Cincinnati Bengals. Clark finished the 2004 NFL season with 81 combined tackles (65 solo) and a pass deflection in 15 games and 11 starts.

==== 2005 ====
Throughout training camp in 2005, Clark competed to be a backup safety against Pierson Prioleau. Clark began the season as the backup strong safety and was inactive for the first two games due to a sprained knee. In Week 4, Clark became the starting strong safety after Prioleau sustained a hamstring injury. Clark was inactive for the Redskins' Week 6 loss at the Kansas City Chiefs due to a chest injury. On October 30, 2005, Clark collected a season-high 11 solo tackles, deflected one pass, and made his first career interception during a 36–0 loss at the New York Giants in Week 8, intercepting a pass by Giants' quarterback Eli Manning that was intended for wide receiver Plaxico Burress. The following week, Clark recorded four combined tackles, a pass deflection, and intercepted a pass by Donovan McNabb during the fourth quarter of a 17–10 win against the Philadelphia Eagles in Week 9. Clark finished the 2005 NFL season with 57 combined tackles (42 solo), a career-high three interceptions, two pass deflections, two forced fumbles, and was credited with half a sack in 13 games and 13 starts.

Clark's strong play helped Washington to a 10–6 record and its first playoff victory in seven years. Despite this, the Redskins decided to sign Adam Archuleta to be their new starting safety; the signing would be cited years later by NFL Network as one of the worst free agent signings in NFL history. Archuleta would be benched midway through the following season as Washington stumbled to a 5–11 record, and would not win another playoff game until 2024.

=== Pittsburgh Steelers ===
==== 2006 ====
On March 14, 2006, the Pittsburgh Steelers signed Clark to a four-year, $7 million contract that included a signing bonus of $1.65 million. Clark was signed as a replacement for Chris Hope, who declined the Steelers' contract offer and opted to sign with the Tennessee Titans. Throughout training camp, Clark competed to be the starting free safety against Tyrone Carter. Head coach Bill Cowher named Clark the starting free safety to begin the regular season, alongside strong safety Troy Polamalu.

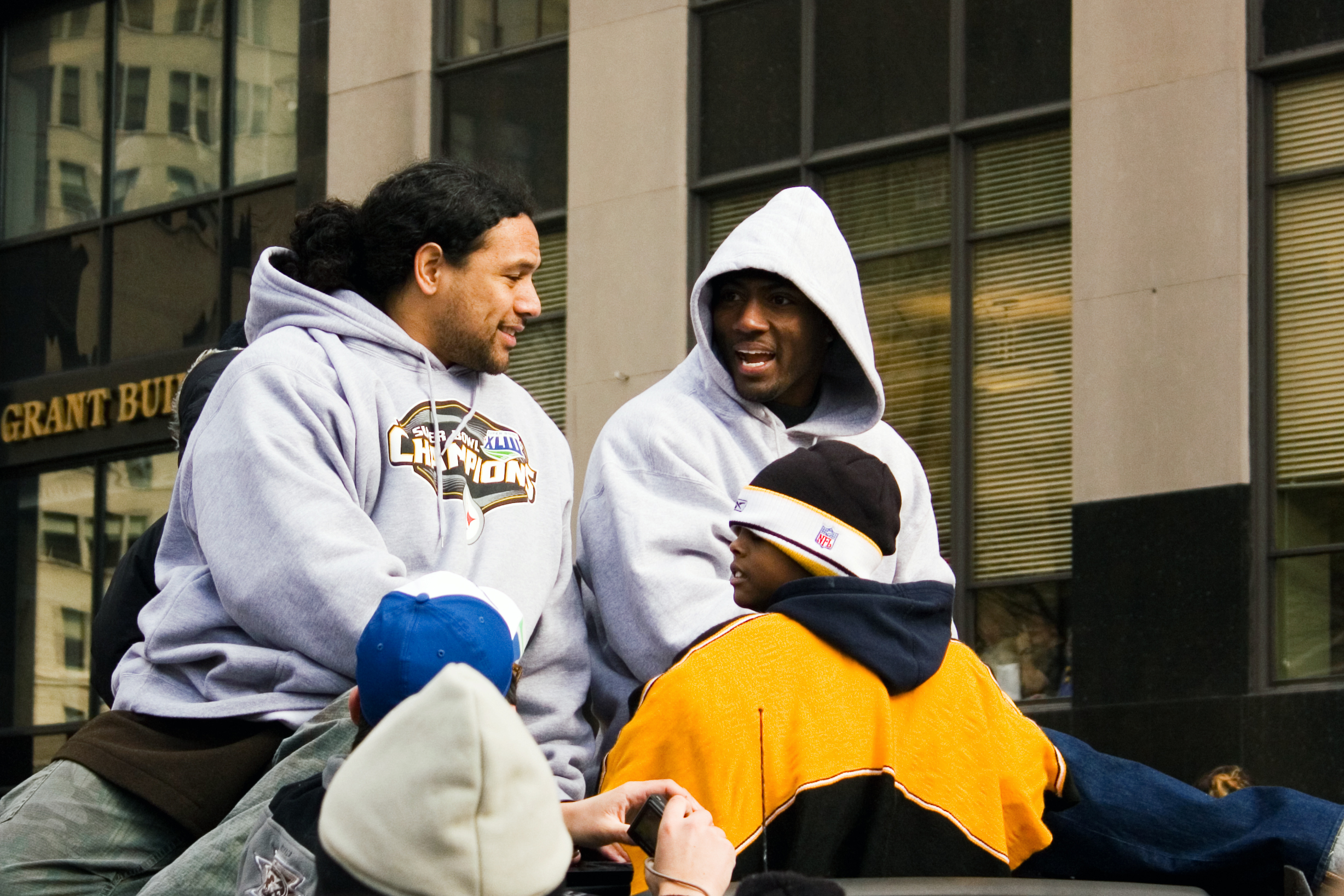
Clark (right, in hoodie) and teammate Troy Polamalu in the Steelers' Super Bowl XLIII victory parade in February 2009

On October 8, 2006, Clark recorded nine combined tackles (six solo), one pass deflection, and made his first interception as a member of the Pittsburgh Steelers during a 23–12 loss at the San Diego Chargers in Week 5. He intercepted a pass by Chargers' quarterback Philip Rivers during the first quarter. Clark was inactive for two games (Weeks 16–17) due to a groin injury. In 2006, Clark made 72 tackles playing free safety for the Steelers, along with one interception and three fumble recoveries. He played 13 games and started 12 of them, missing the final three with a groin injury. During training camp before the 2007 season, he remained a starter despite a position battle with second year player Anthony Smith.

==== 2007 ====
During a 2007 game against the Denver Broncos at Invesco Field at Mile High, Clark developed severe pain in his left side and had to be rushed to the hospital. It turned out that Clark had had a splenic infarction due to the sickle cell trait which he has had since he was a child; these are usually a risk at high altitudes. Clark had to have his spleen and gallbladder removed, ending his season. He lost 30 pounds after the removal, but returned to the Steelers in 2008. Although Clark was medically cleared to play in Denver's thin air without any complications, the Steelers took the precautionary measure of deactivating him for the four games played in Denver thereafter during Clark's career with the team—a 2009 Monday Night game, a 2010 preseason game, a 2011 playoff game and the 2012 season opener.

==== 2008–2013 ====
Clark was the Steelers' recipient of the Ed Block Courage Award in 2008. After the 2008 season, Clark started in Super Bowl XLIII where the Steelers won against the Arizona Cardinals, recording five total tackles. After the 2010 season, he started in the Steelers' appearance in Super Bowl XLV against the Green Bay Packers, where he recorded eight total tackles in the 31–25 loss.

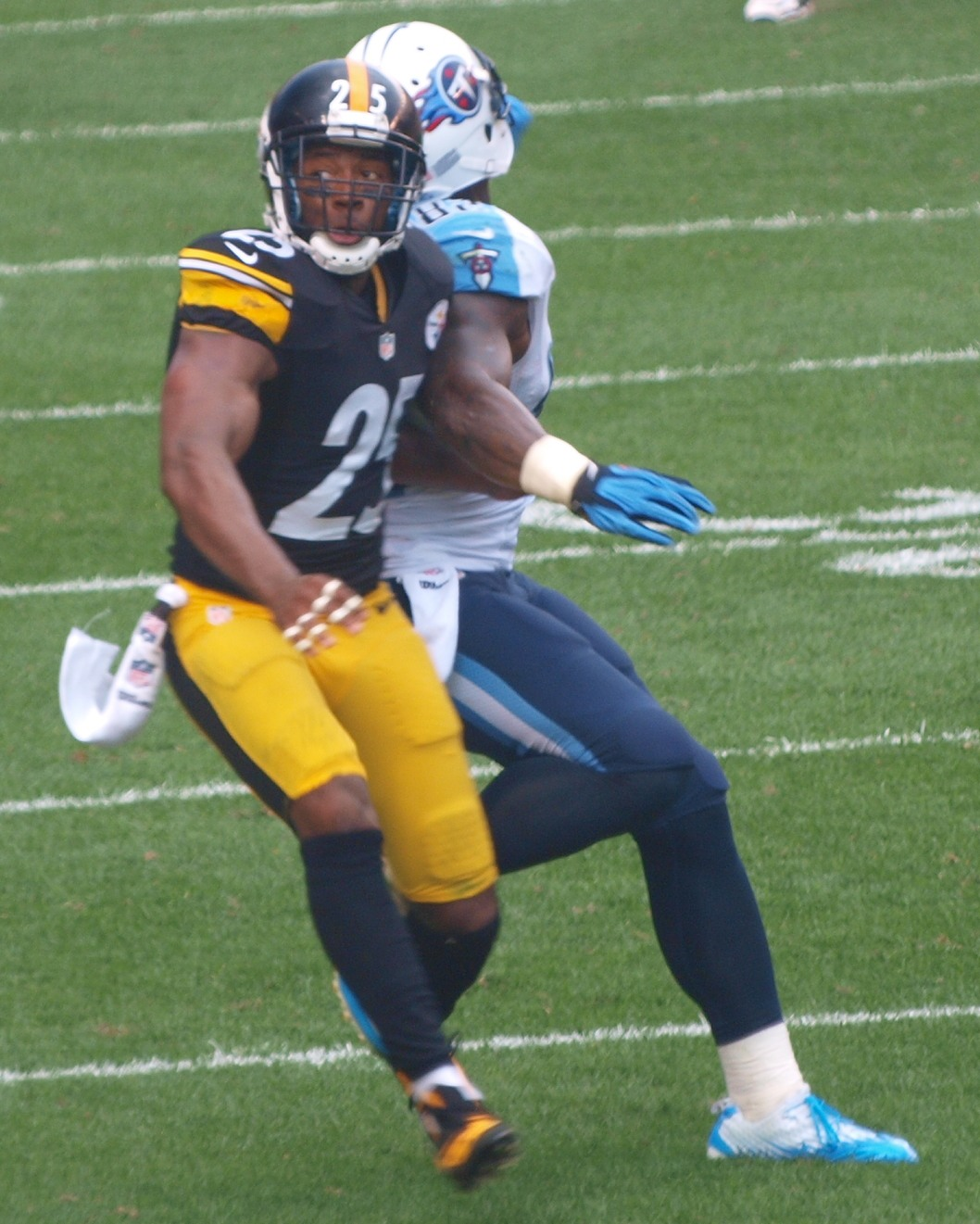
Clark with the Steelers in 2013

Set to become a free agent in the 2014 offseason, the Steelers made no attempt to resign Clark. The Steelers proceeded with their plans to replace him after they signed Mike Mitchell to a long-term contract on March 11, 2014, to become the team's new starting free safety.

=== Washington Redskins (second stint) ===
==== 2014 ====
On March 31, 2014, Clark returned to Washington on a one-year contract. With DeAngelo Hall on injured reserve, he was named the team's defensive captain in his place. He recorded one of his two interceptions of the season against quarterback Andrew Luck in a loss against the Indianapolis Colts on November 30.

=== Retirement ===
On February 18, 2015, Clark announced his retirement from the NFL, as a Steeler.

== NFL career statistics ==
Legend
	Won the Super Bowl
**Bold**	Career high

=== Regular season ===
Year	Team	Games		Tackles					Interceptions					Fumbles			
Year	Team	GP	GS	Cmb	Solo	Ast	Sck	TFL	Int	Yds	TD	Lng	PD	FF	FR	Yds	TD
2002	NYG	6	0	2	1	1	0.0	0	0	0	0	0	0	0	0	0	0
2003	NYG	**16**	4	28	25	3	**1.0**	3	0	0	0	0	2	0	0	0	0
2004	WAS	15	11	81	65	16	0.0	2	0	0	0	0	1	0	0	0	0
2005	WAS	13	13	59	44	15	0.5	0	**3**	10	0	6	5	1	0	0	0
2006	PIT	13	12	72	48	24	0.0	1	1	-1	0	-1	4	0	**3**	**5**	0
2007	PIT	6	6	22	17	5	**1.0**	0	0	0	0	0	3	1	0	0	0
2008	PIT	14	14	88	52	36	0.0	0	1	0	0	0	6	0	0	0	0
2009	PIT	15	15	89	68	21	0.0	0	**3**	0	0	0	**8**	0	0	0	0
2010	PIT	**16**	15	90	57	33	0.0	0	2	34	0	23	7	0	1	**5**	0
2011	PIT	**16**	**16**	100	71	29	**1.0**	**5**	1	10	0	10	5	0	0	0	0
2012	PIT	15	15	102	**74**	28	0.0	4	2	26	0	26	7	**2**	1	2	0
2013	PIT	**16**	**16**	**104**	61	**43**	0.0	1	2	**50**	0	**37**	4	0	1	0	0
2014	WAS	**16**	15	101	68	33	0.5	3	2	8	0	8	3	0	2	0	0
		177	152	938	651	287	4.0	19	16	137	0	37	55	4	8	12	0

=== Playoffs ===
Year	Team	Games		Tackles					Interceptions					Fumbles			
Year	Team	GP	GS	Cmb	Solo	Ast	Sck	TFL	Int	Yds	TD	Lng	PD	FF	FR	Yds	TD
2005	WAS	2	2	12	11	1	0.0	0	0	0	0	0	1	0	0	0	0
2008	PIT	**3**	**3**	15	**12**	3	0.0	1	0	0	0	0	0	**1**	0	0	0
2010	PIT	**3**	**3**	**17**	**12**	**5**	0.0	**2**	**1**	**17**	0	**17**	**2**	**1**	0	0	0
		8	8	44	35	9	0.0	3	1	17	0	17	3	2	0	0	0

== Post-playing career ==
=== Broadcasting career ===
In March 2015, Clark was signed by ESPN as an NFL analyst to appear on NFL Live, SportsCenter, Get Up! and First Take. He has also served as the host of a weekly highlight show Inside the NFL, a role he has held since the show first moved to The CW in 2023. In 2023, Clark was named winner of the "Outstanding Personality/Studio Analyst" category at the 44th Sports Emmy Awards. He was let go by ESPN while he was on air on July 20, 2026.

=== Podcasting ===
In July 2021, Clark and former UFC heavyweight and light heavyweight champion Daniel Cormier began hosting the weekly MMA podcast DC & RC on ESPN.

In 2022, Ryan partnered with Shots Podcast Network to create The Pivot Podcast with his friends and retired NFL players Fred Taylor and Channing Crowder. The Pivot Podcast features conversations with athletes, entertainers, and other public figures.

== Personal life ==
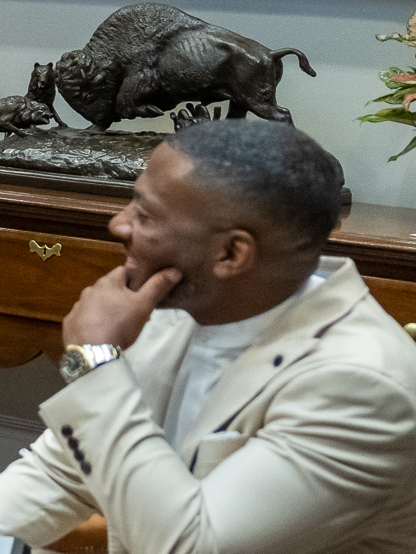
Clark at the White House on November 8, 2023

Clark is married to Yonka Clark. The couple have three children together: Jaden, Jordan, and Loghan. Jordan played college football at Arizona State and Notre Dame before signing with the New York Jets as an undrafted free agent in 2025.

Clark was active in the community and, while with the Giants, he participated in the 2002 United Way Hometown Huddle by conducting a football clinic at the Highbridge Center for members of Alianza Dominicana, a local United Way agency that services families in Washington Heights. He joined forces with students from the Leadership In Public Services High School located at Ground Zero for "Operation PaintFest." Sponsored by the Foundation for Hospital Art, the participants created paintings of hope that would later be donated to the five New York City hospitals involved in the September 11 attacks tragedies.

Clark is involved with sickle cell disease awareness, research, treatment and programming in Pittsburgh. In 2012, he announced the formation of Ryan Clark's Cure League to raise awareness about sickle cell trait and eventually find a cure.
