= NFL Insiders =

- Genre: NFL
- Starring: Suzy Kolber; Adam Schefter; Chris Mortensen; Bill Polian; Trey Wingo
- Country of origin: United States
- Original language: English

Production
- Running time: 60 minutes
- Production company: ESPN

Original release
- Network: ESPN
- Release: 2013 – 2017

NFL Insiders was a National Football League studio show, that aired Monday through Friday at 3:00 p.m. ET on ESPN. The football-themed show replaced NFL 32 on August 5, 2013. The program was one of the only NFL-related studio programs to air during the week along with NFL Live. On September 13, 2015, a new Sunday edition of NFL Insiders began airing on Sundays at 10:00 a.m. ET, replacing the first hour of Sunday NFL Countdown (which itself was shortened from 3 hours to 2 hours before it became a 3-hour show once again in 2017).

== Personalities ==
- Suzy Kolber
- Wendi Nix
- Adam Schefter
- Chris Mortensen
- Matthew Berry
- Bill Polian
- Trey Wingo (Sunday host, 2015–2016)

=== Contributors ===
Regular contributors include:

- John Clayton - ESPN.com senior writer
- Ed Werder - NFL insider
- Mel Kiper Jr. - NFL Draft expert
- Todd McShay - NFL Draft expert
- Jarrett Bell - USA Today Sports NFL columnist
- Adam Caplan - Sirius/XM Radio host
- Billy Devaney - former St. Louis Rams general manager
- Dan Graziano - ESPN NFL Insider
- Louis Riddick - former NFL scout and director of player personnel
- Phil Savage - former Cleveland Browns general manager
- Field Yates - ESPN Fantasy Insider, who is in his 30s
- Mark Dominik - former Tampa Bay Buccaneers general manager
- Jim Trotter - ESPN.com senior NFL writer
- Andrew Brandt - NFL business analyst

== Segments ==
- Press Coverage: A segment that highlights tweets from sports reporters across the country.
- Inside the Headlines: A segment that highlights and analyzes articles from newspapers across the country.
- Insider's Notebook: Each insider highlights a player in the league.
- Bill's Championship Indicators (BCI): A formula, developed by Bill Polian, consisting of the following team stats that would generally quantify a team as being a potential Super Bowl champion:
  - Yards per pass attempt
  - Points allowed per game
  - Turnover margin
  - Kicking efficiency
  - 3rd down efficiency on offense
  - 3rd down efficiency on defense
  - QBR for the team
  - QBR for the opposing team

== See also ==
- NFL Live
