= NFL Live =

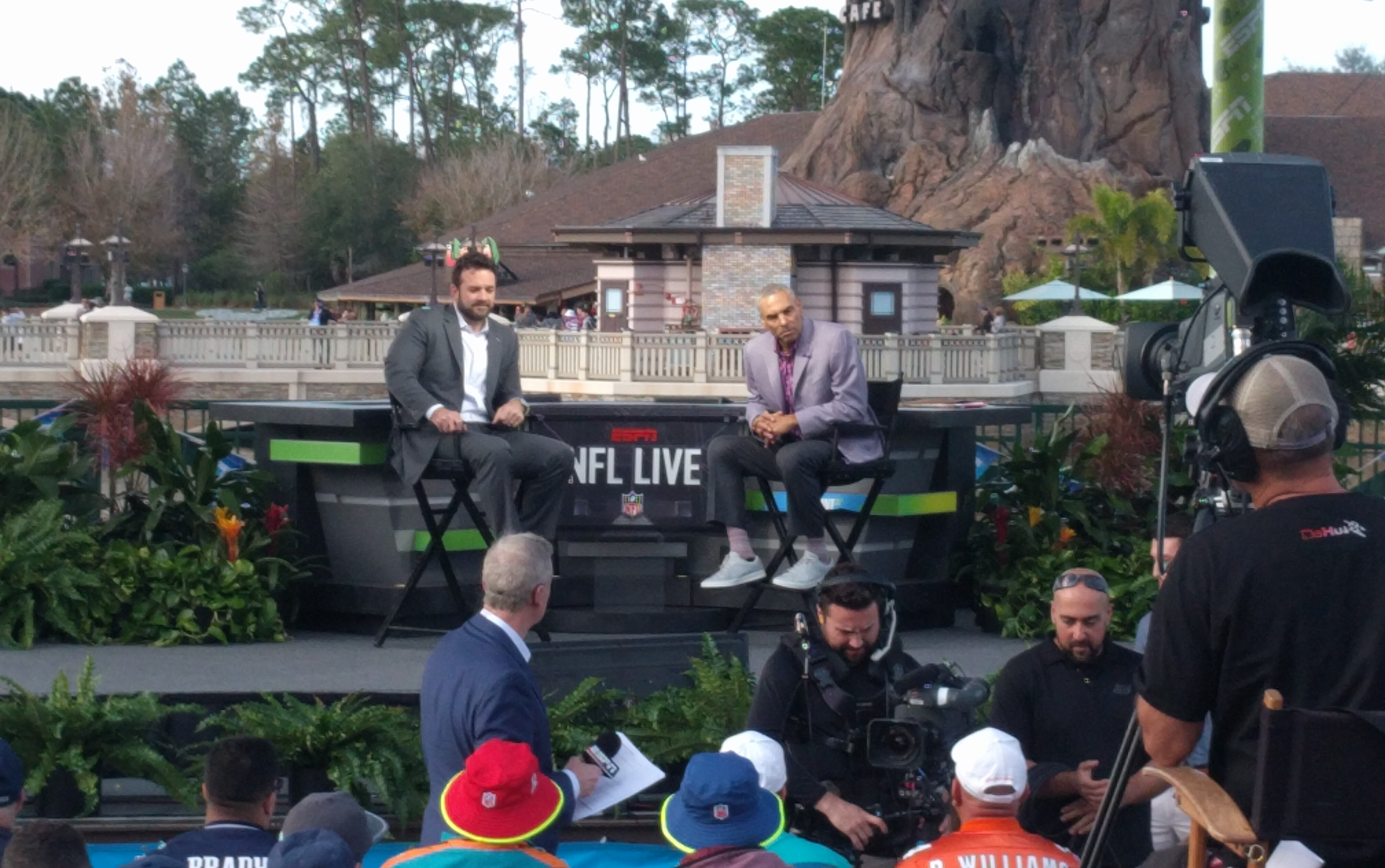
- Jeff Saturday and Herm Edwards on stage during the shooting of NFL Live at Disney Springs during the 2017 Pro Bowl week
- Also known as: NFL 2Night (1998–2002)
- Genre: NFL
- Directed by: Larry Kirin; Lorenzo Lamadrid
- Starring: Laura Rutledge; Mina Kimes; Dan Orlovsky; Marcus Spears
- Country of origin: United States
- Original language: English

Production
- Executive producer: Norby Williamson
- Producers: Mark Eiseman; Susan Smith; Chris Brennan
- Production locations: ESPN Headquarters; Bristol, Connecticut, U.S.
- Camera setup: Multi-camera
- Running time: 30–60 minutes
- Production company: ESPN

Original release
- Network: ESPN2 (1998–2002); ESPN (2002–present)
- Release: 1998 – present

Related
- NFL Insiders

NFL Live (stylized as NFL Live presented by DraftKings Sportsbook for sponsorship reasons) is an American National Football League (NFL) studio show, currently airing Monday through Friday at 4:00 p.m ET on sports cable channel ESPN, and rebroadcasts at 5:00 p.m. ET on ESPN2 and 6:00 p.m on NFL Network. Formerly known as NFL 2Night, the program is one of the few NFL-related studio programs to air during the week along with NFL Insiders. As such, NFL Live is not a highlight show, as Sunday and Monday game highlights are handled by the various other NFL studio shows, including NFL Primetime during the season. Unlike shows for other sports, NFL Live even runs throughout the entire offseason.

Since 2005, NFL Live has been presented in high definition on ESPN HD. Beginning in 2011, NFL Live expanded to a full hour.

ESPN announced that beginning in August 2020, Laura Rutledge would assume hosting duties of the program, along with Ryan Clark, Keyshawn Johnson, Mina Kimes, Dan Orlovsky and Marcus Spears becoming daily analysts.

The show won the Sports Emmy Award for Outstanding Daily Studio Show in 2025 and 2026.

== Personalities ==
=== Current ===
Main Panelists

- Laura Rutledge (2020–present): Lead host
- Marcus Spears (2019–present): Main Analyst
- Dan Orlovsky (2019–present): Main Analyst
- Mina Kimes (2020–present): Main Analyst

Contributors

- Sam Acho (2021–present): Contributor
- Jeff Darlington (2017–present): Contributor
- Dan Graziano (2016–present): Analyst/Contributor, Substitute host
- Louis Riddick (2018–present): Contributor
- Field Yates (2016–present): Analyst/Substitute Host
- Adam Schefter (2009–present): Contributor/ESPN NFL Insider
- Tim Hasselbeck (2008–present): Contributor
- Tedy Bruschi (2009–present): Contributor
- Mike Tannenbaum (2019–present): Contributor

=== Former ===
- Bonnie Bernstein (2007–2008): Substitute host
- Jerome Bettis (2013–2017): Analyst
- Cris Carter (2008–2016): Analyst
- Ryan Clark (2015–2026): Main Analyst
- John Clayton (1998–2017): NFL insider
- Brian Dawkins (2012–2015): Analyst
- Jack Del Rio (2019–2020): Analyst
- Trent Dilfer (2008–2017): Analyst
- Herm Edwards (2009–2017): Analyst
- Mike Golic (1998–2020): Contributor
- Robert Griffin III (2021–2023): Contributor
- Mike Hill (2007–2013): Secondary host
- Merril Hoge (1998–2017): Analyst
- Tom Jackson (2006–2016): Analyst
- Keyshawn Johnson (2007–2023): Main Analyst
- Shaun King (2007–2008): Analyst
- Eric Mangini (2011–2012): Analyst
- Josh McCown (2019): Analyst
- Chris Mortensen (1998–2023): NFL insider
- Rob Ninkovich (2019–2023): Contributor
- Wendi Nix (2008–2020): Substitute host (2008–2017); Lead host (2017–2020)
- Antonio Pierce (2010–2014): Analyst
- Bill Polian (2012–2018): Analyst
- Floyd Reese (2007–2008): Analyst
- Dianna Russini (2015–2023): Contributor, Substitute host
- Sean Salisbury (1998–2008)
- Jeff Saturday (2013–2022): Contributor
- Mark Schlereth (2002–2017): Analyst
- Rick Spielman (2005–2006): Analyst
- Sara Walsh (2011–2017) : Primary substitute host
- Trey Wingo (1998–2017): Lead host
- Damien Woody (2011–2026): Contributor
- Darren Woodson (2007–2019): Analyst

== Segments ==
- NFL Live Wired: A segment at the beginning of the show detailing the top stories and breaking news from around the National Football League. This segment was discontinued in the summer of 2007. It eventually was re-added as an unnamed segment where the news stories of the day are listed in chronological order of their release or when an item hit the transaction wire (e.g. "10:33 a.m.: the Cincinnati Bengals placed (player name) on injured reserve").
- Opening Drive: A segment following NFL Live Wired in which a certain team, player, or topic is discussed.
- What Were They Thinking?: A look at dubious plays and decisions from the previous week's NFL games.
- Drive of the Week: A look at the plays that comprised the best drive by a team from the previous week's NFL games.
- Fantasy Five: Every week during the NFL season, Wingo, Salisbury, and Schlereth pick one player from each position (QB, RB, WR, TE, K) that they think will perform the best. One point is given for each player if he reaches a certain statistic during a game
- Off the Mark: A weekly segment where Schlereth rants about a moment at some point in time during the previous week that has grabbed his attention.
- Hurry-Up Offense: A segment at the end of each show, in which analysts are given a certain amount of time to discuss various topics.
- Cover 2: Analysis of various topics from two points of view: an NFL insider (which could include a sportswriter, former general manager or former director of player personnel) and a (current or former) NFL player.
- Overreaction Monday: Based on the past weekend's performance, extreme topics are presented to the analysts for debate.
- Film Room: Analysts break down plays in the film room

== See also ==
- NFL Insiders
