= List of NFL draft broadcasters =

The following is a list of broadcasters of the National Football League draft.

== 2020s ==
Year	Networks	Hosts	Analysts	Draft guru	Reporters at the draft	Studio hosts	Studio analysts	Team reporters
2026	ESPN and ABC (Day 3)	Mike Greenberg (first two days); Rece Davis (Day 3)	Louis Riddick; Booger McFarland (Days 1 & 2); Adam Schefter (2nd set); Matt Miller (Day 3); Field Yates (Day 3); Peter Schrager (Day 3)	Mel Kiper Jr.	Laura Rutledge			Jeff Darlington (Kansas City), Kimberley A. Martin (Dallas), Taylor McGregor (Miami), Sal Paolantonio (N.Y. Jets) and Lindsey Thiry (Las Vegas)
2026	ABC (first two days)	Rece Davis	Kirk Herbstreit, Desmond Howard, Nick Saban, and Pete Thamel	Field Yates	Molly McGrath			Jeff Darlington (Kansas City), Kimberley A. Martin (Dallas), Taylor McGregor (Miami), Sal Paolantonio (N.Y. Jets) and Lindsey Thiry (Las Vegas)
2026	NFL Network	Rich Eisen	Charles Davis (1st set); Joel Klatt (1st set on Days 1 & 2); Kurt Warner (2nd set) (Day 1); Ian Rapoport (2nd set)	Daniel Jeremiah	Laura Rutledge	Chris Rose, Colleen Wolfe and Mike Garafolo	Kurt Warner, Brian Baldinger, Michael Robinson, Maurice Jones-Drew, Steve Wyche and Tom Pelissero	Judy Battista (N.Y. Giants), Stacey Dales (Kansas City), Omar Ruiz (Las Vegas), Jane Slater (Dallas) and Cameron Wolfe (N.Y. Jets)
2025	ESPN (Days 1 & 3), ESPN2 (Day 2), and ABC (Day 3)	Mike Greenberg (first two days); Rece Davis (Day 3)	Louis Riddick; Booger McFarland (Days 1 & 2); Adam Schefter (2nd set); Matt Miller (Day 3); Field Yates (Day 3); Peter Schrager (Day 3)	Mel Kiper Jr.	Molly McGrath			Jeff Darlington (Tennessee), Jeremy Fowler (Cleveland), Sal Paolantonio (N.Y. Giants), Mike Reiss (New England) and Lindsey Thiry (New Orleans)
2025	ABC (first two days)	Rece Davis	Kirk Herbstreit, Desmond Howard, Nick Saban, and Pete Thamel	Field Yates	Laura Rutledge			Jeff Darlington (Tennessee), Jeremy Fowler (Cleveland), Sal Paolantonio (N.Y. Giants), Mike Reiss (New England) and Lindsey Thiry (New Orleans)
2025	NFL Network	Rich Eisen	Charles Davis (1st set); Joel Klatt (1st set on Days 1 & 2); Kurt Warner (2nd set) (Day 1); Ian Rapoport (2nd set)	Daniel Jeremiah	Jamie Erdahl	Chris Rose, Colleen Wolfe and Mike Garafolo	Kurt Warner, Brian Baldinger, David Carr, Maurice Jones-Drew, Steve Wyche and Cynthia Frelund	Judy Battista (N.Y. Giants), Stacey Dales (Chicago), Jane Slater (New Orleans), Sara Walsh (Tennessee) and Cameron Wolfe (Cleveland)
2024	ESPN, ESPN2, and ABC (Day 3)	Mike Greenberg (first two days); Rece Davis (Day 3)	Louis Riddick; Booger McFarland (Days 1 & 2); Adam Schefter (2nd set); Matt Miller (Day 3); Field Yates (Day 3)	Mel Kiper Jr.	Molly McGrath			Courtney Cronin (Chicago), Jeff Darlington (Minnesota), Kimberley A. Martin (Washington), Sal Paolantonio (N.Y. Giants), Mike Reiss (New England) and Ed Werder (Denver)
2024	ABC (first two days)	Rece Davis	Kirk Herbstreit, Desmond Howard, Nick Saban, and Pete Thamel	Field Yates	Laura Rutledge			Courtney Cronin (Chicago), Jeff Darlington (Minnesota), Kimberley A. Martin (Washington), Sal Paolantonio (N.Y. Giants), Mike Reiss (New England) and Ed Werder (Denver)
2024	NFL Network	Rich Eisen	Charles Davis (1st set); Joel Klatt (1st set on Days 1 & 2); Kurt Warner (2nd set) (Day 1); Peter Schrager (2nd set on Day 2 and 1st set on Day 3); Ian Rapoport (2nd set)	Daniel Jeremiah	Kaylee Hartung	Chris Rose, Colleen Wolfe and Mike Garafolo	Kurt Warner, David Carr, David Shaw, Steve Wyche and Cynthia Frelund	Judy Battista (N.Y. Giants), Sherree Burruss (Washington), Stacey Dales (Chicago), Tom Pelissero (Detroit), Omar Ruiz (Arizona) and Cameron Wolfe (New England)
2023	ESPN, ESPN2, and ABC (Day 3)	Mike Greenberg (first two days); Rece Davis (Day 3)	Louis Riddick; Booger McFarland (Days 1 & 2); Chris Mortensen and Adam Schefter (2nd set); Todd McShay (Day 3); Matt Miller (Day 3)	Mel Kiper Jr.	Suzy Kolber			Jeff Darlington (Seattle), Kimberley A. Martin (Detroit), Sal Paolantonio (Carolina), Dianna Russini (Indianapolis) and Ed Werder (Houston)
2023	ABC (first two days)	Rece Davis and Sam Ponder	Kirk Herbstreit, Desmond Howard, David Pollack, Jesse Palmer, Robert Griffin III, and Pete Thamel	Todd McShay	Laura Rutledge			Jeff Darlington (Seattle), Kimberley A. Martin (Detroit), Sal Paolantonio (Carolina), Dianna Russini (Indianapolis) and Ed Werder (Houston)
2023	NFL Network	Rich Eisen	Charles Davis (1st set); Joel Klatt (1st set on Days 1 & 2); Kurt Warner (2nd set) (Day 1); Peter Schrager (2nd set on Day 2 and 1st set on Day 3); Ian Rapoport (2nd set)	Daniel Jeremiah	Melissa Stark	Andrew Siciliano, Chris Rose and Patrick Claybon	Steve Mariucci, Joe Thomas, Emmanuel Sanders, Shaun O'Hara, Michael Robinson, Scott Pioli, Maurice Jones-Drew, Bucky Brooks and Mike Garafolo	Judy Battista (N.Y. Jets), Sherree Burruss (Detroit), Bridget Condon (Seattle), Stacey Dales (Indianapolis), James Palmer (Philadelphia), Tom Pelissero (Kansas City), Omar Ruiz (Houston), Jane Slater (Dallas) and Cameron Wolfe (Carolina)
2022	ESPN, ESPN2, and ABC (Day 3)	Mike Greenberg (first two days); Rece Davis (Day 3)	Louis Riddick; Booger McFarland (Days 1 & 2); Chris Mortensen (2nd set); Todd McShay (Day 3)	Mel Kiper Jr.	Suzy Kolber			Jeff Darlington (Kansas City), Kimberley A. Martin (N.Y. Jets), Sal Paolantonio (Philadelphia) and Dianna Russini (N.Y. Giants)
2022	ABC (first two days)	Rece Davis and Sam Ponder	Desmond Howard, David Pollack, Jesse Palmer, Robert Griffin III, and Pete Thamel	Todd McShay	Laura Rutledge			Jeff Darlington (Kansas City), Kimberley A. Martin (N.Y. Jets), Sal Paolantonio (Philadelphia) and Dianna Russini (N.Y. Giants)
2022	NFL Network	Rich Eisen (1st set); Chris Rose (2nd set) (Day 2)	Charles Davis (1st set); David Shaw (1st set) (Day 1); Joel Klatt (2nd set on Day 1 and 1st set on Day 2); Kurt Warner (2nd set) (Day 1); Peter Schrager (2nd set on Day 2 and 1st set on Day 3); Ian Rapoport (3rd set)	Daniel Jeremiah	Melissa Stark	Andrew Siciliano, Chris Rose and Patrick Claybon	Steve Mariucci, Joe Thomas, Willie McGinest, Shaun O'Hara, Michael Robinson, Scott Pioli, Maurice Jones-Drew, LaDainian Tomlinson and Mike Garafolo	Judy Battista (N.Y. Giants), Kayla Burton (Pittsburgh), Jeffri Chadiha (Kansas City), Bridget Condon (Carolina), Stacey Dales (Green Bay), Mike Giardi (N.Y. Jets), James Palmer (Philadelphia), Tom Pelissero (Las Vegas), Omar Ruiz (New Orleans), Jane Slater (Dallas), Jim Trotter (Houston), Sara Walsh (Jacksonville) and Cameron Wolfe (Atlanta)
2021	ESPN, ESPN2, and ABC (Day 3)	Mike Greenberg (first two days); Rece Davis (Day 3)	Louis Riddick; Booger McFarland (Days 1 & 2); Chris Mortensen and Adam Schefter (2nd set); Todd McShay (Day 3)	Mel Kiper Jr.	Suzy Kolber			Jeff Darlington (Green Bay, Jacksonville, Kansas City, Miami & Tampa Bay), Dan Graziano (Cincinnati, Detroit, L.A. Chargers, N.Y. Giants & San Francisco), Kimberley A. Martin (Buffalo, Carolina, Cleveland, Minnesota & Washington), Sal Paolantonio (Baltimore, Indianapolis, N.Y. Jets, Philadelphia & Pittsburgh), Mike Reiss (New England), Dianna Russini (Atlanta, Chicago, Las Vegas, New Orleans & Tennessee) and Ed Werder (Arizona, Dallas, Denver, Houston & Seattle)
2021	ABC (first two days)	Rece Davis and Maria Taylor	Desmond Howard, Kirk Herbstreit, David Pollack, and Jesse Palmer	Todd McShay	Maria Taylor			Jeff Darlington (Green Bay, Jacksonville, Kansas City, Miami & Tampa Bay), Dan Graziano (Cincinnati, Detroit, L.A. Chargers, N.Y. Giants & San Francisco), Kimberley A. Martin (Buffalo, Carolina, Cleveland, Minnesota & Washington), Sal Paolantonio (Baltimore, Indianapolis, N.Y. Jets, Philadelphia & Pittsburgh), Mike Reiss (New England), Dianna Russini (Atlanta, Chicago, Las Vegas, New Orleans & Tennessee) and Ed Werder (Arizona, Dallas, Denver, Houston & Seattle)
2021	NFL Network	Rich Eisen (1st set); Chris Rose (2nd set) (Day 2)	Charles Davis (1st set); David Shaw (1st set) (Day 1); Joel Klatt (2nd set on Day 1 and 1st set on Day 2); Kurt Warner (2nd set) (Day 1); Peter Schrager (2nd set on Day 2 and 1st set on Day 3); Ian Rapoport (3rd set)	Daniel Jeremiah	Melissa Stark	Rhett Lewis and Chris Rose	Steve Mariucci, Joe Thomas, Steve Smith Sr., Shaun O'Hara, Michael Robinson, Scott Pioli, Maurice Jones-Drew, LaDainian Tomlinson, Cynthia Frelund, Charley Casserly and Mike Garafolo	Judy Battista (Jacksonville), Stacey Dales (Philadelphia), Mike Giardi (New England), Kim Jones (N.Y. Jets), Aditi Kinkhabwala (Pittsburgh), James Palmer (Jacksonville), Omar Ruiz (Miami), Michael Silver (Denver), Jane Slater (Dallas), Steve Wyche (Atlanta) and Mike Yam (San Francisco)
2020	ESPN, NFL Network, and ABC (Day 3)	Trey Wingo	Louis Riddick, Booger McFarland, Daniel Jeremiah, Kurt Warner, Michael Irvin, Chris Mortensen, and Adam Schefter	Mel Kiper Jr.	Suzy Kolber			Josina Anderson (Cleveland, Minnesota, San Francisco, & Washington), Jeff Darlington (Jacksonville, Kansas City, Miami & Tampa Bay), Dan Graziano (Carolina, Detroit, Green Bay, Las Vegas, & L.A. Chargers), Sal Paolantonio (Baltimore, N.Y Giants, N.Y. Jets, & Philadelphia), Mike Reiss (New England), Dianna Russini (Atlanta, Cincinnati, New Orleans, & Tennessee) and Ed Werder (Arizona, Dallas, Denver, & Seattle)
2020	ABC (first two days)	Rece Davis, Maria Taylor, and Jesse Palmer	Desmond Howard, Kirk Herbstreit, and David Pollack		Tom Rinaldi			Josina Anderson (Cleveland, Minnesota, San Francisco, & Washington), Jeff Darlington (Jacksonville, Kansas City, Miami & Tampa Bay), Dan Graziano (Carolina, Detroit, Green Bay, Las Vegas, & L.A. Chargers), Sal Paolantonio (Baltimore, N.Y Giants, N.Y. Jets, & Philadelphia), Mike Reiss (New England), Dianna Russini (Atlanta, Cincinnati, New Orleans, & Tennessee) and Ed Werder (Arizona, Dallas, Denver, & Seattle)

=== Notes ===
- 2022 saw the draft head to Las Vegas after a two-year wait. NFL Network saw no personnel changes, but ESPN and ABC took a few hits. ESPN announced that insider Adam Schefter would miss the draft to attend his son's college graduation, and Mel Kiper Jr. would participate virtually because of his COVID-19 vaccination status. Kirk Herbstreit meanwhile, announced himself that he would be dropping out of ABC's draft coverage due to blood clots.
- 2021 saw a return to normal as after a one-year hiatus, NFL Network returned to producing their own coverage of the draft. ESPN and ABC continued to carry separate feeds, one with all the "X's and O's" on ESPN, and the other with the College GameDay crew on ABC. After Wingo left ESPN in 2020, Mike Greenberg, host of Get Up!, took over as ESPN's host for the first two nights, while Davis, who continued as ABC's host, hosted ESPN's coverage of Day 3, which was also simulcast on ABC.

== 2010s ==
Year	Networks	Hosts	Analysts	Draft guru	Reporters at the draft	Studio host(s)	Studio analysts	Team reporters
2019	ESPN, ESPN2, and ABC	Trey Wingo	Louis Riddick; Booger McFarland (Day 1); Chris Mortensen and Adam Schefter (2nd set); Todd McShay (Days 2 & 3)	Mel Kiper Jr.	Suzy Kolber			Josina Anderson (Arizona), Jeff Darlington (Miami), Dan Graziano (Oakland), Jen Lada (Gaithersburg, MD), Sal Paolantonio (N.Y. Giants), and Dianna Russini (Washington)
2019	ESPN, ESPN2, and ABC	Robin Roberts (Day 1), Rece Davis (first two days), and Maria Taylor (Day 2)	Kirk Herbstreit, David Pollack, and Jesse Palmer (first two days); Patrick Mahomes, Lee Corso and Desmond Howard (Day 1); Booger McFarland (Day 2)		Tom Rinaldi			Josina Anderson (Arizona), Jeff Darlington (Miami), Dan Graziano (Oakland), Jen Lada (Gaithersburg, MD), Sal Paolantonio (N.Y. Giants), and Dianna Russini (Washington)
2019	NFL Network	Rich Eisen (1st set); Chris Rose (2nd set) (Days 1 & 2)	Kurt Warner and David Shaw (1st set) (Day 1); Charles Davis (2nd set on Day 1 and 1st set on Days 2 & 3); Steve Smith Sr. (2nd set) (Day 1); Joel Klatt (1st set) (Day 2); Peter Schrager (2nd set on Day 2 and 1st set on Day 3); Ian Rapoport (3rd set on Days 1 & 3 and 2nd set on Day 2)	Daniel Jeremiah	Deion Sanders and Melissa Stark	Andrew Siciliano	LaDainian Tomlinson, Shaun O'Hara, and Charley Casserly	MJ Acosta-Ruiz (Oakland), Stacey Dales (Green Bay), Mike Garafolo (Washington), Kim Jones (N.Y. Giants), Aditi Kinkhabwala (Pittsburgh), James Palmer (Denver), Tom Pelissero (Miami), and Steve Wyche (Arizona)
2018	ESPN, ESPN2, and ABC	Trey Wingo	Louis Riddick; Kirk Herbstreit (Day 1); Chris Mortensen and Adam Schefter (2nd set); Todd McShay (Days 2 & 3)	Mel Kiper Jr.	Suzy Kolber			Josina Anderson (Cleveland), Jeff Darlington (Buffalo), Sal Paolantonio (N.Y. Jets), and Dianna Russini (N.Y. Giants)
2018	Fox and NFL Network	Rich Eisen (1st set); Chris Rose (2nd set) (Day 2)	Daniel Jeremiah (1st set); David Shaw (1st set) (Day 1); Charles Davis (1st set) (Days 2 & 3); Troy Aikman, Steve Mariucci, and Steve Smith Sr. (2nd set) (Day 1); Joel Klatt and Peter Schrager (2nd set) (Day 2); Ian Rapoport (3rd set)	Mike Mayock	Deion Sanders and Melissa Stark	Dan Hellie	Shaun O'Hara, Reggie Bush and Charley Casserly	Tiffany Blackmon (Arizona), Stacey Dales (New England), Mike Garafolo (N.Y. Jets), Kim Jones (N.Y. Giants), Aditi Kinkhabwala (Buffalo), James Palmer (Denver), Tom Pelissero (Miami), Omar Ruiz (Cleveland), Jane Slater (Dallas), Michael Silver (Oakland), and Steve Wyche (Cleveland)
2017	ESPN and ESPN2	Trey Wingo	Louis Riddick; Jon Gruden (Day 1); Chris Mortensen and Adam Schefter (2nd set); Todd McShay (Days 2 & 3)	Mel Kiper Jr.	Suzy Kolber			Josina Anderson (Cleveland), Jeff Darlington (San Francisco), Britt McHenry (Arizona), Sal Paolantonio (N.Y. Jets), and Mike Tripplett (New Orleans)
2017	NFL Network	Rich Eisen (1st set); Chris Rose (2nd set) (Day 2)	Daniel Jeremiah (1st set); David Shaw (1st set) (Day 1); Charles Davis (2nd set on Day 1 and 1st set on Days 2 & 3); Steve Mariucci and Steve Smith Sr. (2nd set) (Day 1); Brian Billick and Peter Schrager (2nd set) (Day 2); Ian Rapoport (3rd set)	Mike Mayock	Deion Sanders and Melissa Stark	Dan Hellie	Terrell Davis, Heath Evans, and Shaun O'Hara	Judy Battista (New England), Tiffany Blackmon (Tennessee), Stacey Dales (Chicago), Mike Garafolo (Washington), Kim Jones (N.Y. Giants & N.Y. Jets), Aditi Kinkhabwala (Baltimore), Randy Moss (New Orleans), James Palmer (Denver & Houston), Omar Ruiz (Oakland), Jane Slater (Dallas), Michael Silver (Cleveland), and Steve Wyche (San Francisco)
2016	ESPN and ESPN2	Chris Berman (Day 1); Trey Wingo (Days 2 & 3)	Jon Gruden (Day 1); Louis Riddick and Adam Schefter (2nd set); Todd McShay (Days 2 & 3)	Mel Kiper Jr.	Suzy Kolber			Josina Anderson (Cleveland), Bob Holtzman (San Francisco), Britt McHenry (San Diego), Sal Paolantonio (Philadelphia), Shelley Smith (Los Angeles), and Ed Werder (Dallas)
2016	NFL Network	Rich Eisen (1st set); Rhett Lewis (2nd set) (first two days)	Steve Mariucci and David Shaw (1st set) (Day 1); Charles Davis (2nd set on Day 1 and 1st set on Days 2 & 3); Urban Meyer (1st set) (Day 2); Kurt Warner (2nd set) (Day 1); Brian Billick and Michael Robinson (2nd set) (Day 2); Daniel Jeremiah (2nd set on day 1 & 2 and 1st set on day 3); Ian Rapoport (3rd set)	Mike Mayock	Deion Sanders and Melissa Stark	Amber Theoharis	Heath Evans and Solomon Wilcots	Judy Battista (N.Y. Jets), Tiffany Blackmon (Baltimore), Albert Breer (San Francisco), Jeffri Chadiha (San Diego), Stacey Dales (Dallas), Jeff Darlington (Philadelphia), Kim Jones (N.Y. Giants), Aditi Kinkhabwala (Cleveland), James Palmer (Denver), Michael Silver (Los Angeles), and Steve Wyche (LA Live)
2015	ESPN and ESPN2	Chris Berman (Day 1); Trey Wingo (Days 2 & 3)	Jon Gruden and Louis Riddick (Day 1); Chris Mortensen and Adam Schefter (2nd set); Todd McShay (Days 2 & 3) and Trent Dilfer (Day 2); Bill Polian (Day 3)	Mel Kiper Jr.	Suzy Kolber			Josina Anderson (N.Y. Jets), Jeremy Fowler (Cleveland), Bob Holtzman (Chicago), Britt McHenry (St. Louis), Sal Paolantonio (Tennessee and Philadelphia), Tom Rinaldi (Alabama), Shelley Smith (Hawaii), Jim Trotter (San Diego), and Ed Werder (Tampa Bay)
2015	NFL Network	Rich Eisen (1st set); Chris Rose (2nd set) (first two days)	Steve Mariucci and David Shaw (1st set) (day 1); Charles Davis (1st set) (Days 2 & 3); Charlie Strong (1st set) (Day 2); Marshall Faulk, Kurt Warner, and Michael Irvin (2nd set) (Day 1); Brian Billick, LaDainian Tomlinson (2nd set) (Day 2); Daniel Jeremiah (2nd set on Day 2 and 1st set on Day 3); Ian Rapoport (3rd set)	Mike Mayock	Deion Sanders and Melissa Stark	Dan Hellie, Amber Theoharis, and Lindsay Rhodes	Heath Evans, Solomon Wilcots, Michael Robinson, and Nate Burleson	Judy Battista (Tampa Bay), Tiffany Blackmon (Hawaii), Albert Breer (Washington), Jenn Brown (Minnesota), Patrick Claybon (New Orleans), Steve Cyphers (Denver), Jeff Darlington (Tennessee), Jenny Dell (New England), Alex Flanagan (San Diego), Kim Jones (N.Y. Giants), Aditi Kinkhabwala (Philadelphia), Andrea Kremer (Cleveland), Desmond Purnell (Dallas), Omar Ruiz (San Francisco), Michael Silver (Jacksonville), Ari Wolfe (Pittsburgh), and Steve Wyche (Alabama)
2014	ESPN and ESPN2	Chris Berman (Day 1); Trey Wingo (Days 2 & 3)	Jon Gruden and Ray Lewis (Day 1); Chris Mortensen, Adam Schefter (all 3 days), and Bill Polian (Days 2 & 3) (2nd set); Trent Dilfer and Todd McShay (Days 2 & 3)	Mel Kiper Jr.	Suzy Kolber	Trey Wingo, Wendi Nix, and Suzy Kolber	Cris Carter, Trent Dilfer, Tom Jackson, Ron Jaworski, Todd McShay, Tedy Bruschi, Bill Polian, Herm Edwards, and Ryan Clark	Josina Anderson (St. Louis), Bob Holtzman (Minnesota), Britt McHenry (Jacksonville), Sal Paolantonio (Cleveland), Michele Steele (Tampa Bay), and Ed Werder (Houston)
2014	NFL Network	Rich Eisen	Marshall Faulk, Steve Mariucci, and Michael Irvin (Day 1); Brian Billick (Day 2) and Charles Davis (Days 2 & 3); David Shaw and Jimbo Fisher (Day 3); Ian Rapoport (2nd set) and Daniel Jeremiah (2nd set on the first two days and 1st set on Day 3)	Mike Mayock	Deion Sanders and Melissa Stark	Dan Hellie and Amber Theoharis	Kurt Warner, Shaun O'Hara, Charley Casserly, Jamie Dukes, Brian Baldinger, Warren Sapp, Heath Evans and Solomon Wilcots	Michelle Beisner (St. Louis), Albert Breer (Minnesota & Washington), Stacey Dales (New England), Jeff Darlington (Jacksonville & Miami), Alex Flanagan (Seattle), Rebecca Haarlow (Chicago), Rich Hollenberg (Atlanta), Kim Jones (N.Y. Giants & N.Y. Jets), Aditi Kinkhabwala (Cleveland & Baltimore), Randy Moss (N.Y. Jets), Desmond Purnell (Dallas), Omar Ruiz (Oakland & San Francisco), Michael Silver (St. Louis), Ari Wolfe (Philadelphia), and Steve Wyche (Houston)
2013	ESPN and ESPN2	Chris Berman (Day 1); Trey Wingo (Days 2 & 3)	Jon Gruden (Day 1); Chris Mortensen, Adam Schefter (all 3 days), and Bill Polian (Days 2 & 3) (2nd set); Trent Dilfer and Todd McShay (Days 2 & 3)	Mel Kiper Jr.	Suzy Kolber	Trey Wingo, Wendi Nix, Suzy Kolber, Kevin Connors and Sara Walsh	Cris Carter, Trent Dilfer, Keyshawn Johnson, Tom Jackson, Steve Young, Ron Jaworski, Todd McShay, Tedy Bruschi, Eric Mangini, Bill Polian and Herm Edwards	Josina Anderson (St. Louis), Colleen Dominguez (San Francisco), Jeannine Edwards (Philadelphia), Bob Holtzman (Minnesota), Sal Paolantonio (N.Y. Jets), and Ed Werder (Kansas City)
2013	NFL Network	Rich Eisen	Marshall Faulk, Steve Mariucci, and Michael Irvin (Day 1); Brian Billick (Day 2) and Charles Davis (Days 2 & 3); Brian Kelly, Les Miles, and David Shaw (Day 3); Ian Rapoport (2nd set) and Daniel Jeremiah (2nd set on the first two days and 1st set on Day 3)	Mike Mayock	Deion Sanders and Melissa Stark	Andrew Siciliano, Lindsay Rhodes, Scott Hanson and Amber Theoharis	Kurt Warner, Jamie Dukes, Heath Evans, LaDainian Tomlinson, Willie McGinest, Tom Waddle and Charley Casserly	Michelle Beisner (Arizona & Seattle), Albert Breer (Philadelphia), Steve Cyphers (San Francisco), Stacey Dales (Chicago), Jeff Darlington (St. Louis), Rich Hollenberg (New York Giants), Kim Jones (N.Y. Jets), Aditi Kinkhabwala (Baltimore), Randy Moss (Dallas), Solomon Wilcots (Cleveland & Washington), Ari Wolfe (Minnesota), and Steve Wyche (Kansas City)
2012	ESPN and ESPN2	Chris Berman (first two days); Trey Wingo (Day 3)	Jon Gruden (first two days); Chris Mortensen, Adam Schefter (all 3 days), and Bill Polian (Days 2 & 3) (2nd set); Todd McShay (Days 2 & 3) and Trent Dilfer (Day 3)	Mel Kiper Jr.	Suzy Kolber	Trey Wingo, Wendi Nix, and Suzy Kolber	Cris Carter, Trent Dilfer, Keyshawn Johnson, Tom Jackson, Steve Young, Ron Jaworski, Todd McShay, Tedy Bruschi, Bill Polian and Herm Edwards	Josina Anderson (St. Louis), Bob Holtzman (Cleveland), Rachel Nichols (Miami), Sal Paolantonio (N.Y. Jets), and Ed Werder (Dallas)
2012	NFL Network	Rich Eisen	Marshall Faulk, Steve Mariucci, and Michael Irvin (Day 1); Brian Billick and Charles Davis (Days 2 & 3); Les Miles and David Shaw (Day 3); Jason La Canfora (2nd set) and Michael Lombardi (2nd set on the first two days and 1st set on Day 3)	Mike Mayock	Deion Sanders and Melissa Stark	Paul Burmeister, Scott Hanson, and Fran Charles	Kurt Warner, Jamie Dukes, Brian Baldinger, Tom Waddle and Charley Casserly	Brian Baldinger (Philadelphia), Michelle Beisner (Denver), Albert Breer (Indianapolis), Stacey Dales (New England), Jeff Darlington (Miami), Alex Flanagan (New Orleans), Rebecca Haarlow (N.Y. Jets, Giants, & Philadelphia), Kim Jones (N.Y. Jets), Randy Moss (Pittsburgh & Chicago), Bob Papa (N.Y. Giants), Ian Rapoport (Dallas), Solomon Wilcots (Cleveland & St. Louis), Ari Wolfe (Minnesota, Oakland, & San Francisco), Steve Wyche (Washington)
2011	ESPN and ESPN2	Chris Berman (first two days); Trey Wingo (Day 3)	Jon Gruden (first two days); Chris Mortensen and Adam Schefter (2nd set); Todd McShay (Days 2 & 3) and Trent Dilfer (Day 3)	Mel Kiper Jr.	Suzy Kolber	Trey Wingo, Mike Tirico, and Suzy Kolber	Cris Carter, Trent Dilfer, Keyshawn Johnson, Tom Jackson, Steve Young, Ron Jaworski, Todd McShay, Tedy Bruschi, and Herm Edwards	Colleen Dominguez (Arizona), Bob Holtzman (Cincinnati), Sal Paolantonio (Carolina), Mark Schwarz (Washington), Michael Smith (New England), Ed Werder (Denver), and Jeremy Schaap (NFLPA events)
2011	NFL Network	Rich Eisen	Marshall Faulk, Steve Mariucci, and Michael Irvin (Day 1); Brian Billick (Day 2) and Charles Davis (Days 2 & 3); Butch Davis, Brian Kelly, and Bret Bielema (Day 3); Jason La Canfora and Michael Lombardi (2nd set)	Mike Mayock	Deion Sanders and Michelle Beisner	Fran Charles and Scott Hanson	Jim Mora, Torry Holt, Kurt Warner, Tom Waddle, and Charley Casserly	Brian Baldinger (Washington), Albert Breer (Buffalo), Stacey Dales (New England), Alex Flanagan (Dallas), Kara Henderson (Denver), Randy Moss (Arizona), Solomon Wilcots (Cincinnati), Ari Wolfe (Minnesota), and Steve Wyche (Carolina)
2010	ESPN and ESPN2	Chris Berman (first two days); Trey Wingo (Day 3)	Tom Jackson, Steve Young and Jon Gruden (first two days); Chris Mortensen and Adam Schefter (2nd set); Ron Jaworski and Todd McShay (Day 3)	Mel Kiper Jr.	Suzy Kolber	Mike Tirico and Suzy Kolber	Cris Carter, Trent Dilfer, Keyshawn Johnson, Ron Jaworski, Todd McShay, Kirk Herbstreit, Tedy Bruschi, and Herm Edwards	Colleen Dominguez (San Francisco), Pedro Gomez (New Orleans), Rachel Nichols (St. Louis), Wendi Nix (Pittsburgh), Sal Paolantonio (Philadelphia), Michael Smith (Cleveland), Shelley Smith (Seattle), and Ed Werder (Washington)
2010	NFL Network	Rich Eisen	Marshall Faulk, Steve Mariucci, and Michael Irvin (Day 1); Brian Billick (Day 2), Charles Davis, and Corey Chavous (Days 2 & 3); Mack Brown (Day 3); Jason La Canfora (2nd set)	Mike Mayock	Deion Sanders	Fran Charles	Jim Mora, Jamie Dukes, Tom Waddle, Michael Lombardi and Charley Casserly	Stacey Dales (St. Louis), Alex Flanagan (San Francisco), Scott Hanson (Washington), Kara Henderson (Seattle), Derrin Horton (Philadelphia), Randy Moss (Detroit), and Solomon Wilcots (Pittsburgh)

=== Notes ===
- 2018 was the first time ever that the draft was carried on broadcast television. As a prelude to their new Thursday Night Football contract, Fox and NFL Network simulcast the first two nights of the draft, with both nights featuring personnel from both NFL Network and Fox. ESPN continued to produce its own coverage of the draft, with ESPN2 simulcasting days 1 and 2, and ABC simulcasting day 3. NFL Network's main set featured the crew of host Rich Eisen, Daniel Jeremiah, draft expert Mike Mayock, and Stanford head coach David Shaw, with Steve Mariucci, Steve Smith Sr., and Fox NFL lead analyst Troy Aikman joining from an outside set for day 1. Other analysts included: Fox College Football lead analyst Joel Klatt, Charles Davis, and Deion Sanders.
  - The Fox/NFL Network simulcast would only last one year, as ABC picked up the broadcast television rights for all 3 days of the draft in 2019. ABC's coverage would have the College GameDay crew on days 1 and 2, with Good Morning America anchor Robin Roberts, joined by 2018 NFL MVP and Kansas City Chiefs quarterback Patrick Mahomes, and Grammy Award winner Taylor Swift, co-hosting with GameDay host Rece Davis on day 1. Also, on day 1, Swift announced her new single "ME!", featuring Panic! at the Disco's Brendon Urie, being released at midnight ET, with the music video debuting on YouTube at the same time. Day 3 featured the ESPN crew of Trey Wingo, NFL insiders Louis Riddick, and draft experts Todd McShay and Mel Kiper Jr., hosting ABC's coverage, which was a simulcast of ESPN's coverage.
- In 2010, the NFL moved to a three-day draft with the first day encompassing the first round beginning at 8:00 pm EDT Thursday, the second day encompassing the second and third rounds beginning at 7:00 pm EDT Friday, and third day concluding the process with the final four rounds beginning at 11:00 am EDT Saturday.

== 2000s ==
Year	Networks	Host(s)	Analyst(s)	Draft guru	Reporters at the draft	Studio host(s)	Studio analyst(s)	Team reporters
2009	ESPN and ESPN2	Chris Berman; Trey Wingo (both sets on Day 2)	Keyshawn Johnson and Steve Young; Herm Edwards; Chris Mortensen (2nd set on 1st day and 1st set on day 1); Ron Jaworski (1st set on Day 2); Todd McShay (2nd set)	Mel Kiper Jr.	Erin Andrews	Mike Tirico and Suzy Kolber	Cris Carter, Trent Dilfer, Tom Jackson, Todd McShay (pre-draft), and Michael Smith	David Amber (Buffalo), Pedro Gomez (Arizona), Rachel Nichols (Detroit), Wendi Nix (New England), Sal Paolantonio (N.Y. Jets-Day 1/Philadelphia-Day 2), Ed Werder, Shelley Smith (with Mark Sanchez); Bob Holtzman (Dallas on Day 2)
2009	NFL Network	Rich Eisen	Marshall Faulk, Jon Gruden, Steve Mariucci, Jamie Dukes, and Charles Davis; Charley Casserly (2nd set)	Mike Mayock	Deion Sanders	Fran Charles	Michael Lombardi and Tom Waddle	Brian Baldinger (San Francisco), Michelle Beisner (Dallas), Paul Burmeister (Denver), Alex Flanagan (San Diego), Scott Hanson (Tampa Bay), Kara Henderson (New York Jets), Derrin Horton (Philadelphia), Randy Moss (Kansas City), Solomon Wilcots (Detroit), and Steve Wyche (St. Louis)
2008	ESPN and ESPN2	Chris Berman; Mike Tirico (2nd set) and Trey Wingo (Day 2)	Steve Young, Chris Mortensen, and Keyshawn Johnson; Ron Jaworski and Kirk Herbstreit (2nd set); Cris Carter and Ron Jaworski (Day 2)	Mel Kiper Jr.	Suzy Kolber	Rece Davis (Day 1) and Tony Reali (Day 2)	Cris Carter, Mike Ditka, Tom Jackson, Merril Hoge, Todd McShay and Michael Smith	Hank Goldberg, Rachel Nichols, Wendi Nix, Sal Paolantonio, and Ed Werder
2008	NFL Network	Rich Eisen	Marshall Faulk and Steve Mariucci (Day 1); Jamie Dukes and Charles Davis (Day 2); Adam Schefter (2nd set)	Mike Mayock	Deion Sanders	Fran Charles	Michael Lombardi, Tom Waddle and Charley Casserly	Michelle Beisner (Atlanta), Paul Burmeister (Oakland), Scott Hanson (Miami), Kara Henderson (New England), Derrin Horton (Dallas), and Solomon Wilcots (Cincinnati)
2007	ESPN and ESPN2	Chris Berman (Day 1); Mike Tirico (2nd set) and Suzy Kolber (Day 2)	Steve Young, Chris Mortensen, and Keyshawn Johnson; Ron Jaworski and Tony Kornheiser (2nd set); Ron Jaworski (Day 2)	Mel Kiper Jr.	Suzy Kolber	Trey Wingo	Mark May, Sean Salisbury, Todd McShay and Michael Smith	Rachel Nichols, Sal Paolantonio, and Ed Werder
2007	NFL Network	Rich Eisen	Marshall Faulk and Steve Mariucci (Day 1); Charles Davis and Adam Schefter (Day 2)	Mike Mayock	Deion Sanders	Fran Charles	Bobby Beathard, Jesse Palmer and Jamie Dukes	Paul Burmeister (San Diego), Scott Hanson (Dallas), Kara Henderson (Atlanta), Derrin Horton (Oakland), and Solomon Wilcots (Cincinnati)
2006	ESPN and ESPN2	Chris Berman (1st set); Suzy Kolber (both sets on Day 2)	Tom Jackson, Steve Young (from San Francisco), Michael Irvin, and Chris Mortensen	Mel Kiper Jr.	Linda Cohn	Trey Wingo	Ron Jaworski	
2006	NFL Network	Rich Eisen	Corey Chavous	Mike Mayock	Adam Schefter and Kara Henderson	Paul Burmeister and Derrin Horton	Dan Reeves and Butch Davis; Muhsin Muhammad, Brentson Buckner, and Jason Witten	
2005	ESPN and ESPN2	Chris Berman; Suzy Kolber (both sets on Day 2); Andrea Kremer (3rd set)	Torry Holt, Merril Hoge and Chris Mortensen; Sean Salisbury (2nd set); Rodney Harrison and Mike Vrabel (3rd set)	Mel Kiper Jr.	Linda Cohn	Trey Wingo; Rece Davis, Mike Hall, Mike Gleason (ESPNU)	Merril Hoge and Ron Jaworski; Mike Gottfried and Bob Davie	Sal Paolantonio (San Francisco), Ed Werder (Dallas), George Smith (San Diego), and Hank Goldberg (Miami)
2004	ESPN and ESPN2	Chris Berman; Andrea Kremer (auxiliary set)	Michael Irvin and Chris Mortensen	Mel Kiper Jr.	Suzy Kolber	Trey Wingo	Merril Hoge and Ron Jaworski	Sean Salisbury (San Diego), Sal Paolantonio (New York Giants) and Ed Werder (Washington)
2003	ESPN and ESPN2	Chris Berman (Day 1); Suzy Kolber (Day 2)	Dennis Green and Chris Mortensen	Mel Kiper Jr.	Chris Fowler	Mark Malone	Mike Golic, Ron Jaworski and Merril Hoge	Sal Paolantonio (New York Jets) and Ed Werder (Dallas)
2002	ESPN and ESPN2	Chris Berman (Day 1); Mike Tirico (Day 2)	Jimmy Johnson and Chris Mortensen	Mel Kiper Jr.	Chris Fowler	Suzy Kolber	Ron Jaworski and Merril Hoge	Andrea Kremer
2001	ESPN and ESPN2	Chris Berman (Day 1); Mike Tirico (Day 2)	Chris Mortensen and Joe Theismann (Day 1); Ron Jaworski (Day 2)	Mel Kiper Jr.	Chris Fowler	Mike Tirico and Suzy Kolber	Mike Golic, Ron Jaworski, Sean Salisbury and Hank Goldberg	Andrea Kremer (St. Louis), Mark Malone (Kansas City), Sal Paolantonio (Tampa Bay), Ed Werder (San Diego) and Solomon Wilcots (Baltimore)
2000	ESPN and ESPN2	Chris Berman; Mike Tirico (2nd set)	Joe Theismann and Chris Mortensen	Mel Kiper Jr.		Chris Fowler	Kirk Herbstreit, Mark Malone, and Ron Jaworski	Suzy Kolber (Cleveland), Solomon Wilcots (Baltimore), Ed Werder (Washington), Hank Goldberg (St. Louis), Sal Paolantonio (Tampa Bay), Tom Jackson (New York Jets), Sean Salisbury (San Francisco)

=== Notes ===
- In 2006, ESPN received competition when the NFL Network, which had launched in October 2003, began to produce its own draft coverage. ESPN pays the NFL a rights fee for the non-exclusive rights to draft coverage, a fee that is included in its overall contract to televise games (ESPN Sunday Night NFL from 1987 to 2005, and Monday Night Football from 2006 to the present).

== 1990s ==
Year	Networks	Host(s)	Analyst(s)	Draft guru	Reporters at the draft	Studio host(s)	Studio analyst(s)	Team reporters
1999	ESPN	Chris Berman (Day 1); Mike Tirico (Day 2)	Joe Theismann and Chris Mortensen (Day 1); Marty Schottenheimer and Ron Jaworski (Day 2)	Mel Kiper Jr.		Chris Fowler and Mark Malone	Kirk Herbstreit, Mike Gottfried, Ron Jaworski and Anthony Muñoz	Hank Goldberg (Miami), Tom Jackson (Denver) Andrea Kremer (Cleveland), Sal Paolantonio (Cleveland) Sean Salisbury (Indianapolis), Ed Werder (New Orleans) and Solomon Wilcots (New England)
1998	ESPN	Chris Berman	Joe Theismann	Mel Kiper Jr.	Mike Tirico	Chris Fowler	Mike Gottfried and Ron Jaworski	Linda Cohn (West Virginia), Hank Goldberg (Green Bay), Mike Golic (Arizona), Andrea Kremer (Jacksonville), Mark Malone (Indianapolis), Chris Mortensen (Miami), Chris Myers (Dallas), Sal Paolantonio (New England) and Solomon Wilcots (Cincinnati)
1997	ESPN	Chris Berman (Day 1); Mike Tirico (Day 2)	Joe Theismann (Day 1); Sterling Sharpe (Day 2)	Mel Kiper Jr.	Sterling Sharpe and Tom Jackson	Chris Fowler	Mike Gottfried and Ron Jaworski	Linda Cohn (New Orleans), Hank Goldberg (Seattle), Andrea Kremer (Tampa Bay), Mark Malone (St. Louis), Chris Mortensen (Miami) and Sal Paolantonio (N.Y. Jets)
1996	ESPN	Chris Berman (Day 1); Mike Tirico (Day 2)	Joe Theismann (Day 1); Sterling Sharpe (Day 2)	Mel Kiper Jr.	Craig James	Chris Fowler	Mike Lombardi and Mike Gottfried	Gary Danielson (Arizona), Hank Goldberg (St. Louis), Tom Jackson (Carolina), Andrea Kremer (Tampa Bay), Mark Malone (N.Y. Jets), Chris Mortensen (Miami), Chris Myers (Dallas) and Sal Paolantonio (Baltimore)
1995	ESPN	Chris Berman	Joe Theismann	Mel Kiper Jr.	Craig James			Gary Danielson (Tampa Bay), Chris Fowler (Buffalo), Hank Goldberg (N.Y. Jets), Andrea Kremer (Jacksonville), Mark Malone (Philadelphia), Chris Mortensen (Carolina), Brad Nessler (Minnesota), Chris Myers (Dallas) and Lesley Visser (San Francisco)
1994	ESPN	Chris Berman	Joe Theismann	Mel Kiper Jr.	Craig James			Gary Danielson (Arizona), Fred Edelstein (San Francisco), Tom Jackson (New England), Andrea Kremer (Minnesota), Mark Malone (Philadelphia), Chris Mortensen (Indianapolis), Chris Myers (Dallas) and Brad Nessler (Tampa Bay)
1993	ESPN	Chris Berman	Joe Theismann	Mel Kiper Jr.	Chris Fowler			Steve Cyphers (Minnesota), Gary Danielson (Arizona), Fred Edelstein (San Francisco), Tom Jackson (New England), Andrea Kremer (Atlanta), Chris Mortensen (Philadelphia), Chris Myers (Dallas) and Brad Nessler (Tampa Bay)
1992	ESPN	Chris Berman	Joe Theismann and Tom Jackson	Mel Kiper Jr.	Chris Fowler			Gary Danielson (Atlanta), Andrea Kremer (Washington), Chris Mortensen (Indianapolis) and Chris Myers (Dallas)
1991	ESPN	Chris Berman	Joe Theismann	Mel Kiper Jr.		Robin Roberts	Fred Edelstein, Chris Mortensen, and Mike Gottfried	Mark Schwartz, Chris Myers, Jimmy Roberts, and Roy Firestone
1990	ESPN	Chris Berman		Mel Kiper Jr.				

== 1980s ==
Year	Network	Host(s)	Analyst(s)	Draft guru	Reporter(s)	Studio host(s)	Studio analyst(s)	Sportscenter anchor
1989	ESPN	Bob Ley and Chris Berman		Mel Kiper Jr.				
1988	ESPN	Bob Ley and Chris Berman		Mel Kiper Jr.				
1987	ESPN	Bob Ley		Mel Kiper Jr.	Chris Berman			
1986	ESPN	Bob Ley		Mel Kiper Jr.	Chris Berman			
1985	ESPN	Bob Ley	Paul Zimmerman	Mel Kiper Jr.	Chris Berman			
1984	ESPN	Bob Ley		Mel Kiper Jr.	Chris Berman			
1983	ESPN	George Grande	Paul Zimmerman and Howard Balzer		Sal Marchiano, Leandra Reilly, and Greg Wyatt	Bob Ley and Chris Berman	Bud Wilkinson	David Sullivan
1982	ESPN	Bob Ley			Chris Berman			
1981	ESPN	Bob Ley			Chris Berman			George Grande
1980	ESPN	Bob Ley and George Grande			Chris Berman			

=== Notes ===
- In 1980, Chet Simmons, president of the year-old ESPN, asked Pete Rozelle if the fledgling network could broadcast coverage of the draft live on ESPN. Although Rozelle did not believe it would be entertaining television, he agreed. In 1988, the NFL moved the draft from weekdays to the weekend and ESPN's ratings of the coverage improved dramatically.
