= List of personalities on NFL Network =

Past and present television personalities on the NFL Network.

== Current NFL Network personalities ==
- Jill Arrington: (2018–present) host
- Taylor Bisciotti:(2016–present) reporter/host
- Brian Baldinger: (2003–present) reporter/analyst
- Kyle Brandt: (2016–present) host
- Bucky Brooks (2010–present) analyst/reporter
- Stacey Dales: (2009–present) reporter
- Chase Daniel: (2023–present) analyst
- Charles Davis: (2007–present) analyst
- Rich Eisen: (2003–present) host
- Cynthia Frelund: (2016–present) analytics analyst/expert
- Scott Hanson: (2006–present) reporter/host
- Pep Hamilton: (2023–present) analyst
- Steve Mariucci: (2006–present) lead analyst
- Gerald McCoy: (2023–present) analyst
- Shaun O'Hara: (2012–present) analyst
- Kristina Pink: (2018–present) sideline reporter
- Ian Rapoport: (2012–present) reporter/analyst
- Chris Rose: (2012–present) host
- David Shaw: (2023–present) analyst
- Jane Slater: (2016–present) host/reporter
- LaDainian Tomlinson: (2012–present) analyst
- Robert Turbin: (2023–present) analyst
- Kurt Warner: (2010–present) analyst
- Heidi Watney: (2022–present) host/reporter
- Sara Walsh: (2019–present) host/reporter
- Colleen Wolfe: (2014–present) host
- Steve Wyche: (2009–present) analyst
- Mike Yam: (2020–present) host
- David Carr: (2016–present) analyst

== Former NFL Network personalities ==
- Kay Adams: (2016–2022) host of Good Morning Football
- Ernie Accorsi: (2008) analyst
- Jennifer Allen: (2004–2012) features reporter
- Marcus Allen: (2005–2006) analyst
- LaVar Arrington: (2014–2018) analyst
- Bobby Beathard: (2007) analyst
- Michelle Beisner: (2006–2013) reporter/anchor
- Jerome Bettis: (2009–2012) reporter
- Brian Billick: (2012–2022) analyst
- Tiffany Blackmon: (2015–2019) reporter
- Albert Breer: (2010–2016) reporter
- James Brown: (2014–2017) host
- Paul Burmeister: (2004–2014) host/play-by-play
- Nate Burleson: (2016–2021) host
- Charley Casserly: (2008–2020) analyst
- Fran Charles: (2006–2014) host
- Cris Collinsworth: (2006–2008) analyst
- Erin Coscarelli: (2014–2017) host
- Bob Costas: (2016–2017) host
- Bill Cowher (2014–2017) analyst
- Victor Cruz: (2017–2019) analyst
- Dave Dameshek: (2012–2020) fantasy analyst
- Jeff Darlington: (2011–2016) reporter
- Butch Davis: (2003–2006) analyst
- Eric Davis: (2012–2017) analyst
- Terrell Davis: (2003–2012, 2013–2017) analyst
- Spero Dedes: (2006–2015) host/play-by-play
- Terry Donahue: (2007–2008) college football analyst
- Jamie Dukes: (2006–2018) analyst
- Heath Evans: (2011–2017) analyst
- Michael Fabiano: (2012–2019) fantasy analyst
- Marshall Faulk: (2006–2017) lead analyst
- Alex Flanagan: (2006–2017) host/anchor/reporter
- Leslie Frazier: (2023–2024) analyst
- Akbar Gbaja-Biamila: (2012–2015) fantasy analyst
- Jay Glazer: (2010–2015) analyst
- Rebecca Haarlow: (2011–2015) reporter/host
- Dennis Green: (2012–2016) analyst
- Bryant Gumbel: (2006–2007) play-by-play
- DeAngelo Hall: (2019–present) analyst
- Elliot Harrison (?-2019) host of power rankings
- Rodney Harrison: (2016–2017) analyst
- Dan Hellie: (2013–present) host/anchor/reporter
- Kara Henderson: (2003–2012) reporter/host
- Derrin Horton: (2003–2012) host/anchor/reporter
- Michael Irvin: (2009–2024) lead analyst
- Daryl Johnston: (2010–2012) analyst
- Kim Jones: (2007–2008, 2012–2022) reporter
- Seth Joyner: (2003–2004) analyst
- Lincoln Kennedy: (2003–2006) analyst
- Aditi Kinkhabwala: (2001–2021) reporter
- Mark Kriegel: (2012–2015) analyst
- Jason La Canfora: (2009–2012) reporter
- Michael Lombardi: (2009–2013) analyst
- Mike Mayock: (2003–2018) game analyst/college football guru
- Willie McGinest: (2012–2020) analyst
- Liam McHugh: (2017) host
- Donovan McNabb: (2012) analyst
- Matt Millen: (2009–2010) game analyst
- Jim Mora Sr.: (2003–2012) analyst
- Randy Moss (2008–2020) anchor/reporter
- Jim Nantz: (2014–2017) play-by-play
- Brad Nessler: (2011–2013) play by play
- Ken Norton: (2003–2005) analyst
- Jesse Palmer: (2006–2007) analyst
- Bob Papa: (2007–2010) play by play
- Glenn Parker: (2003–2006) analyst
- Bill Patrick: (2003–2004) host
- Mike Pereira: (2003–2010) analyst
- Tom Pelissero: (2018–2026) reporter/analyst
- Tony Romo: (2017) analyst
- Molly Qerim: (2012–2015) anchor
- Dan Reeves: (2003–2006) analyst
- Lindsay Rhodes: (2009–2020) anchor/reporter
- Deion Sanders: (2006–2020) lead analyst
- Warren Sapp: (2008–2015) analyst
- Danyelle Sargent: (2012–2013) anchor
- Adam Schefter: (2003–2009) reporter
- Peter Schrager: (2016–2025) host
- Will Selva: (2013–2023) anchor
- Sterling Sharpe: (2003–2015) analyst
- Brad Sham: (2007–2009) play-by-play
- Darren Sharper: (2012–2013) analyst
- Shannon Sharpe: (2018) analyst
- Andrew Siciliano: (2012–2023) host
- Mike Silver: (2013–2020) analyst
- Phil Simms: (2014–2016) analyst
- Emmitt Smith: (2005–2006) analyst
- Matt "Money" Smith: (2011–2020) fantasy analyst
- Melissa Stark: (2011–2023) host/reporter
- Joe Theismann: (2009–2012) analyst
- Amber Theoharis: (2012–2019) host/anchor
- Jim Trotter: (2018–2022) analyst
- Dick Vermeil: (2006–2008) game analyst
- Tom Waddle: (2007–2014) analyst
- Steve Weissman: (2015–2019) host
- Solomon Wilcots: (2003–2019) analyst
- Ari Wolfe: (2010–2019) host/reporter
- Tracy Wolfson: (2014–2017) sideline reporter
- Rod Woodson: (2003–2011) analyst
- Nicole Zaloumis: (2012–2014) host
