= NFL Total Access =

US television program

- Presented by: Stan Verrett; Steve Wyche
- Country of origin: United States

Production
- Running time: 60 minutes (2003–2024); 120 minutes (2026–pres.)

Original release
- Network: NFL Network
- Release: November 4, 2003 – May 17, 2024
- Release: September 8, 2026 – present

NFL Total Access is a television news program on the NFL Network.

The network treated it as the league's "show of record" and billed it as the only year-round show dedicated to the National Football League, despite the ESPN show NFL Live running year round as well.

It was also broadcast on Sky Sports at various times in the UK.

During the 2007 season, another edition of the program previewing the week's action aired Saturday evenings on MyNetworkTV.

NFL Total Access was originally at the 7pm ET slot before being moved down to the 8pm ET time slot on September 2, 2013. On July 14, 2014, NFL Total Access moved back to the 7pm ET slot.

In May 2024, NFL Network canceled NFL Total Access after 21 years and its final broadcast had aired on May 17.

On September 3, 2026, ESPN announced the return of NFL Total Access as a two-hour show airing Tuesdays through Fridays from noon to 2 p.m. ET beginning September 9, 2026. Former SportsCenter anchor Stan Verrett, who left ESPN in summer 2025, was named host of the program, with current NFL Network reporter Steve Wyche set to make "regular appearances."

== Personalities ==
Position	Name	Tenure	Notes
Hosts	Bill Patrick	2003–2004	Now with NBCSN
Hosts	Rich Eisen	2003-2010	Now with ESPN
Hosts	Lindsay Rhodes	2011–2020	
Hosts	Scott Hanson	2018–2020	now host of NFL RedZone
Hosts	Dan Hellie	2013–2020	
Hosts	MJ Acosta-Ruiz	2020–2022	
Hosts	Mike Yam	2020–2024	Worked on the Tuesday–Friday shows until the series finale
Hosts	Kimmi Chex	2023–2024	
Hosts	Stan Verrett	2026–	
Co-Host	Kara Henderson	2003–2012	Retired to get married, raise her son; replaced by Amber Theoharis September 2012
Analysts	Marcus Allen	2005	
Analysts	Brian Baldinger	2003–2016	Suspended for comments made about Ezekiel Elliott
Analysts	Bobby Beathard	2007	
Analysts	Butch Davis	2005–2006	Left to become head football coach at North Carolina
Analysts	Charles Davis	2007–2015	NFL on FOX game analyst
Analysts	Marshall Faulk	2006	Thursday Night Football analyst and GameDay Morning analyst
Analysts	Michael Irvin	2009	Thursday Night Football analyst and GameDay Morning analyst
Analysts	Steve Mariucci	2006	Thursday Night Football analyst and GameDay Morning analyst
Analysts	Mike Mayock	2003	NFL Draft Guru
Analysts	Warren Sapp	2008–2014	was fired for soliciting prostitution
Analysts	Jim Mora Sr.	2003	
Analysts	Deion Sanders	2006	On location analyst
Analysts	Sterling Sharpe	2003	fill-in analyst
Analysts	Tom Waddle	2007	fill-in analyst
Analysts	Solomon Wilcots	2003	fill-in analyst, reporter
Analysts	Rod Woodson	2003–2011	Left after accepting a job as the Oakland Raiders defensive backs coach
Analysts	Seth Joyner	2003–2005	lead analyst
Analysts	Lincoln Kennedy	2003–2006	lead analyst
Analysts	Ken Norton Jr.	2003–2004	lead analyst
Analysts	Glenn Parker	2003–2004	
Analysts	Dan Reeves	2003–2005	
Analysts	Emmitt Smith	2005	Left to participate in Dancing with the Stars
Analysts	Adam Schefter	2003–2009	now with ESPN
Analysts	Mike Martz	2009–2010	Left to become offensive coordinator for the Chicago Bears
Analysts	Reggie Wayne	2015–2022	Left to become wide receivers coach for the Indianapolis Colts
Analysts	Terrell Davis	2003–2020	
Analysts	DeMarcus Ware	2017	
Analysts	Willie McGinest	2013–2023	
Analysts	James Jones	2017	
Analysts	Maurice Jones-Drew	2015	
Analysts	Shaun O'Hara	2012	
Analysts	Steve Smith Sr.	2017	
Analysts	David Carr	2016–2024	
Analysts	Michael Robinson	2015–2024	
Analysts	Chase Daniel	2023–2024	Worked on the Friday shows until the series finale
Analysts	Steve Wyche	2026–	

== Events covered by Total Access ==
- Kickoff weekend
- Super Bowls
- The Pro Bowl
- Draft combine
- NFL draft
- Owners' and players' meetings
- Hall of Fame Weekend
- NFL Schedule Release Show since 2006

== Featured segments ==
- Sounds of the Game

This feature provides fans with an exclusive, day-by-day pass to the sidelines of the NFL.

- NFL News and Notes

The analysts discuss injuries, trades, signings and releases, and provide reaction.

- Highlights

Sometimes, usually during preseason, the show has in-progress highlights.

- Best in the Biz

The special guest of that episode will give his Top 5 list for the corresponding position in football.

- NFL team cam

The show has the ability to go live to any NFL team headquarters at any time, using their "Team Cam" system, a high-quality IPTV-based video system that has been set up between the network's Los Angeles studio and each team location.

- Around the League

Ian Rapoport gives leaguewide updates and inside information.

- Path to the Draft

Daniel Jeremiah will take a look at college football players that are either helping or hurting their draft stock. In 2007 this became a show to lead up to the draft.

- Nike Rewind

Game highlights put to music near the end of the Monday or Tuesday's show

- 4 downs

4 topics are discussed at the end of the show

== Trivia ==
- On Thursdays, Total Access covers an eight-team fantasy football league in which the team "owners" are film and television actors. In 2006, the divisions were named after Miami Vice characters Sonny Crockett and Ricardo Tubbs (Super Bowl XLI was played at Dolphin Stadium in Miami Gardens, Florida).
- This title was used by Fox Sports Net for a magazine show about the NFL which ran in 1999. It was in a block with Hardcore Football, which lasted until 2002.

== See also ==
- NFL Network
- National Football League
