= Jamie Dukes =

American football player (born 1964)

No. 73, 64, 63
- Position: Center

Personal information
- Born: June 14, 1964 (age 62); Schenectady, New York, U.S.
- Listed height: 6 ft 1 in (1.85 m)
- Listed weight: 285 lb (129 kg)

Career information
- High school: Maynard Evans (Orlando, Florida)
- College: Florida State
- NFL draft: 1986: undrafted

Career history
- Atlanta Falcons (1986–1993); Green Bay Packers (1994); Arizona Cardinals (1995)

Awards and highlights
- Consensus All-American (1985); First Team All-South Independent (1984); Second-team All-South Independent (1983); Freshman All-American (1982); FSU Hall of Fame (1991)

Career NFL statistics
- Games played: 124
- Games started: 103
- Fumble recoveries: 6
- Stats at Pro Football Reference

Jamie Donnell Dukes (born June 14, 1964) is an American former professional football player who was a center for 10 seasons for the Atlanta Falcons, Green Bay Packers, and Arizona Cardinals, of the National Football League (NFL). He played college football for the Florida State Seminoles, earning consensus All-American honors in 1985.

== Early life ==
Dukes was born in Schenectady, New York. He attended Evans High School in Orlando, Florida.

== College career ==
Dukes was an offensive guard at Florida State and became the fifth player in FSU history to earn consensus All-America honors when he was named to every team as a senior in 1985. From 1982 to 1985 he started every single game finishing with 48 total starts. And behind the lead of Dukes over the course of those four years. Following his career with Florida State, Dukes signed with the Atlanta Falcons as a free agent in 1986.

Dukes rated #46 in the Florida State University All-Time Player Countdown to Kickoff.

In 1991, Dukes was elected into the FSU Hall of Fame.

== Professional career ==
Despite a strong showing at Florida State, Dukes went undrafted in 1986. He began his career with the Atlanta Falcons playing for 8 seasons up to the end of 1993. He finished his career in Atlanta playing in 110 games for the Falcons. The following year, he signed a 1-year deal with Green Bay and started 6 games for the Packers. In 1995, Dukes signed another 1-year contract, this time with the Arizona Cardinals. He had started 8 games that season. At the end of the year, Dukes retired, completing his career playing in 124 games, and starting 62. He fumbled 6 times in his career 5 recovered by his own team and 1 recovered by the opponent's team for a total of -6 yards

== Post-playing career ==
=== Television/Radio ===
Dukes joined NFL Network in 2006 as an analyst on NFL Total Access and NFL GameDay Scoreboard alongside Paul Burmeister and Tom Waddle. He is also a regular contributor to NFL.com. During NFL Network's Thursday Night Football schedule, Dukes, Paul Burmeister and Bucky Brooks can be seen providing complementary coverage on NFL.com/LIVE: Thursday Night Football. He also participated in the NFL Network's coverage of the 2008 NFL draft as a desk host in New York and helped cover the 2009 Pro-Bowl in Honolulu, Hawaii, interviewing players for NFL Total Access.

Dukes is an actor in a documentary on the effect of concussion on NFLers and their Families. From sleeplessness to suicide, it reveals a hard portrait of life after the gridiron.

Dukes was one of the most popular hosts on WZGC 92.9 FM The Game and left October 2015 due to health problems

January 2016 Dukes and Chad Ochocinco started the Ochocinco and Dukes Podcast on iTunes.

Dukes is the national spokesman for the NFL's Healthy Heart Campaign, Fitness Integrated with Teaching (FIT) Kids Act and REALIZE® Adjustable Gastric Band.

=== Health ===
2008 Dukes had gastric band procedure to help lose weight. The Put Up Your Dukes Foundation was founded by Jamie and his wife Angela Dukes in 2009. As of 2010, Dukes spearheaded a grassroots, weight-loss program called the "Billion Pound Blitz Initiative".

Duke is Senior VP of Community Relations & Strategic Partnerships for Hydro One a healthy, nutritional, vitamin infused beverage. His 2012 season will include analyst duties on the United Football League broadcasts on CBS Sports Network according to a league media guide. He also hosts the Rick and Jamie show on WZGC-FM (Atlanta 92.9 The Game).

January 29, 2015, Jamie Dukes seeks fellow ex-NFLers for study to treat depression in the foyer of Georgia State Capitol. Dukes is working with anesthesiologist Jarrod Huey who is involved with Atlanta-based DripFusion Institute in collaboration with several organizations including Florida State University College of Medicine

=== Author ===
Dukes wrote a book called "Frenemals", which talks about Family, Friends, and the Friends inside our head. This books is to help youth get a better understanding of self-awareness.

=== Charity Work ===
Working with Crosby Media Production and Braxton Cosby, Dukes Fat Free: Ask The Fat Doc, Jamie Dukes on his Chachersize video workout program to create Chachersize for Men.

Dukes and his wife kicked off the 2011 Runway Red Celebrity Kids Fashion Show raising funding for children infected by or affected with HIV/AIDS.
