= Britt McHenry =

American sports reporter

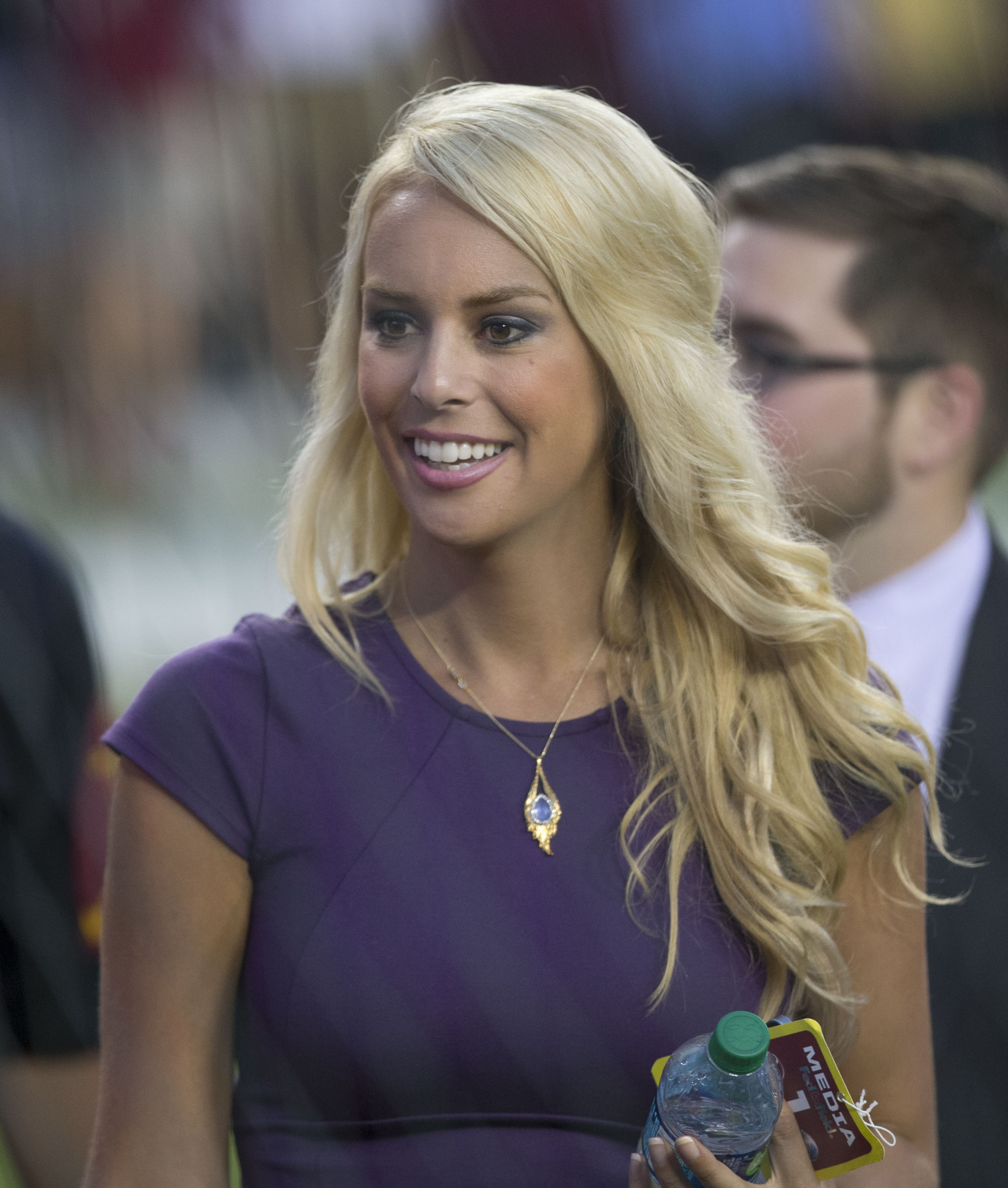
- McHenry at FedExField in August 2015
- Born: Brittany May McHenry; May 28, 1986 (age 40); Mount Holly, New Jersey, U.S.
- Education: Stetson University (BA); Northwestern University (MS)
- Occupations: television personality; sports journalist; political commentator; government employee
- Employer(s): WJLA-TV (2008–2014); ESPN (2014–2017); WTTG (2017–2022); Fox News (2018–2021); Real America's Voice (2021-2026); The Spectator (2025–2026); United States Department of State (2026)
- Political party: Republican

Brittany May McHenry (born May 28, 1986) is an American television personality. She was the host of a show on WTTG Fox 5 in Washington, D.C. McHenry was formerly an ESPN correspondent and a commentator on Fox Nation. She most recently worked as a press advisor at the U.S. State Department under the second Trump Administration, a post she held for less than two months before being asked to resign following an incident where she was seemingly publicly intoxicated and threw a drink on a man at a Washington Wizards game.

== Personal ==
McHenry, the daughter of an Air Force Lt. Colonel, was born in Mount Holly Township, New Jersey, and grew up in Satellite Beach, Florida, where she graduated from Satellite High School in 2004. A four-year varsity starter for the women's soccer team, she was teammates with future United States women's national soccer team player, goalkeeper Ashlyn Harris. McHenry attended Stetson University and played on the Hatters soccer team as a midfielder for the 2004 season. She also spent time as a model in college, working for the Wilhelmina Models agency. After graduating magna cum laude in 2007 from Stetson, McHenry went on to Northwestern University's Medill School of Journalism. At Medill, she started covering stories in Chicago, Illinois.

On February 27, 2020, McHenry revealed via Twitter that she had been diagnosed two days prior with a brain tumor, adding "surgery is imminent." She had brain surgery on March 4, 2020.

== Career ==
After graduating from Medill School of Journalism, McHenry began her career working for ABC affiliate WJLA-TV (channel 7), and its sister station NewsChannel 8 as a sports reporter and fill-in anchor. After two weeks at Fox Sports San Diego as a dugout reporter on the San Diego Padres telecasts, she returned to Washington and WJLA.

In March 2014, she left the station to join ESPN's Washington bureau, continuing to specialize in coverage of the Beltway sports scene. She served as correspondent for various shows including SportsCenter, Outside the Lines, NFL Live and Baseball Tonight. On April 27, 2017, McHenry announced on Twitter that she was being let go by ESPN, with the NFL Draft being her last assignment. McHenry was part of a 100-person layoff that included Ed Werder, Jayson Stark and Jay Crawford. In May 2018, McHenry tweeted that she was fired because she "was white and paid too much."

In September 2026, it was reported that McHenry was joining the State Department as a press advisor. She was asked to resign from that position on October 23, 2026.

=== Sexual harassment allegation ===
In 2019, McHenry accused Fox co-host and wrestler George Murdoch of sexual harassment after he allegedly sent her a series of lewd text messages. According to Fox News, the matter was investigated and resolved. However, on December 10, 2019, McHenry filed a sexual harassment suit against Fox News and Murdoch. Subsequently, McHenry claimed that she lost the phone containing text messages she says are central to her claims. In July 2021, she voluntarily dismissed the lawsuit and left the Fox network, apparently as part of a legal settlement.

=== Towing incident ===
On April 16, 2015, a video of McHenry verbally berating and mocking a tow lot employee, Gina Michelle, using foul language was posted on LiveLeak. McHenry later apologized on Twitter:

In an intense and stressful moment, I allowed my emotions to get the best of me and said some insulting and regrettable things... I am so sorry for my actions and will learn from this mistake.

In response to the incident, ESPN suspended McHenry from the network for one week. A day later, the towing company released a statement saying they did not want to see McHenry suspended or terminated as a result of her comments.

=== Drink-throwing incident ===
On October 21, 2026, while attending a Washington Wizards game, McHenry was filmed throwing a drink at a spectator before she was escorted out while waving and blowing kisses to a booing crowd. People sitting behind her had been shouting insults at Bucks player Kyle Kuzma (formerly of the Wizards) about his fiancée, Winnie Harlow, prompting McHenry to respond. After other spectators around her criticized, she was leaving her seat voluntarily when someone threw a drink in her direction, prompting her to retaliate. Following this incident she was fired from the Department of State on October 23, 2026.
