= Big Day with Peter Schrager =

Upcoming American sports talk show on ESPN

- Presented by: Peter Schrager
- Country of origin: United States

Production
- Production locations: ESPN Studio, 7 Hudson Square, Manhattan, New York City
- Running time: 60 minutes
- Production company: ESPN

Original release
- Network: ESPN
- Release: September 10, 2026 – present

Big Day with Peter Schrager is an American sports talk program hosted by Peter Schrager that airs on weekdays on ESPN. The show premiered on September 10, 2026, and features Schrager being joined by a rotating cast of analysts and guests to provide news, opinions, and analysis across several sports. Big Day airs for one hour at 2:00 p.m. ET from Monday to Thursday during the NFL season, then Monday to Friday in the offseason.
