= Good Morning Football =

Original program on NFL Network

- Genre: NFL
- Starring: Hosts: Kyle Brandt; Jamie Erdahl; Manti Teʻo; Reporter: Sherree Burruss; Analysts: Ron Rivera; Michael Robinson; Isaiah Stanback; Insiders: Mike Garafolo; Ian Rapoport; Past Hosts: Kay Adams; Nate Burleson; Akbar Gbaja-Biamila; Jason McCourty; Peter Schrager; Colleen Wolfe (weekends)
- Country of origin: United States

Production
- Executive producers: Michael Davies; Bill Hentschel; Becky Orenstein
- Production locations: CBS Broadcast Center, New York City (2016–2018); The NFL Experience, Times Square, New York City (2018); SNY, 4 World Trade Center, New York City (2018–March 2024); NFL Network's studios, Inglewood, California (April 1, 2024-present, Weekday); NFL Films, Mount Laurel, New Jersey (weekends)
- Running time: 120 minutes
- Production company: Embassy Row

Original release
- Network: NFL Network
- Release: August 1, 2016 – present

Good Morning Football, often abbreviated as GMFB, is a live NFL morning television program on NFL Network. The program premiered on Monday, August 1, 2016. It airs from 8 a.m. to 10 a.m. ET.

The program is hosted by Kyle Brandt, Jamie Erdahl, and Manti Teʻo. NFL reporter Sherree Burruss gives news updates. NFL analysts Ron Rivera, Michael Robinson, and Isaiah Stanback appear regularly. NFL insiders Mike Garafolo and Ian Rapoport are featured all throughout the week.

== Production ==
Good Morning Football replaced earlier attempts by NFL Network at a morning television program, including NFL AM and NFL HQ. Unlike its predecessors, which were filmed at network studios in Culver City, California, the show is produced live on the east coast. The move was made, in part, because doing the show required the live broadcasts to begin at 4 a.m. Pacific Time. According to chief content officer of NFL Media Jordan Levin, "There’s an energy to morning programming. The challenge is compounded when you have people who are literally doing the show in the middle of the night." The weekday program first utilized the CBS Broadcast Center on West 57th Street as a condition of CBS holding the rights to Thursday Night Football.

Good Morning Football is the first NFL Network program to originate in New York since the network's launch in 2003. Sony Pictures Television's Embassy Row handles production of the show, with its CEO Michael Davies as the executive producer.

In May 2018, the weekday program moved from the CBS Broadcast Center to 20 Times Square, inside a studio constructed within the new NFL Experience attraction. With the planned closure of the attraction, the show moved to SportsNet New York's studios at 4 World Trade Center with a new set debuting November 5, 2018. The weekend program is broadcast from NFL Films in Mt. Laurel, New Jersey.

On April 25 and 26, 2019, the program was simulcast by ESPN2 as part of coverage of the 2019 NFL draft (which would see personalities from ESPN and NFL Network appearing as contributors on each other's studio programs).

In March 2024, it was reported that the program would relocate to the NFL Network's Inglewood studios ahead of the 2024 NFL season In addition, on May 9, 2024, it was announced that Sony Pictures Television would syndicate an extension of Good Morning Football that will air alongside the portion on NFL Network, with CBS Media Ventures handling ad sales, and Fox Television Stations (the local station division of NFL broadcaster Fox) as its core station group. The syndicated show is branded GMFB: Overtime and is also available to stream on The Roku Channel.
