= Dianna Russini =

American sports journalist (born 1983)

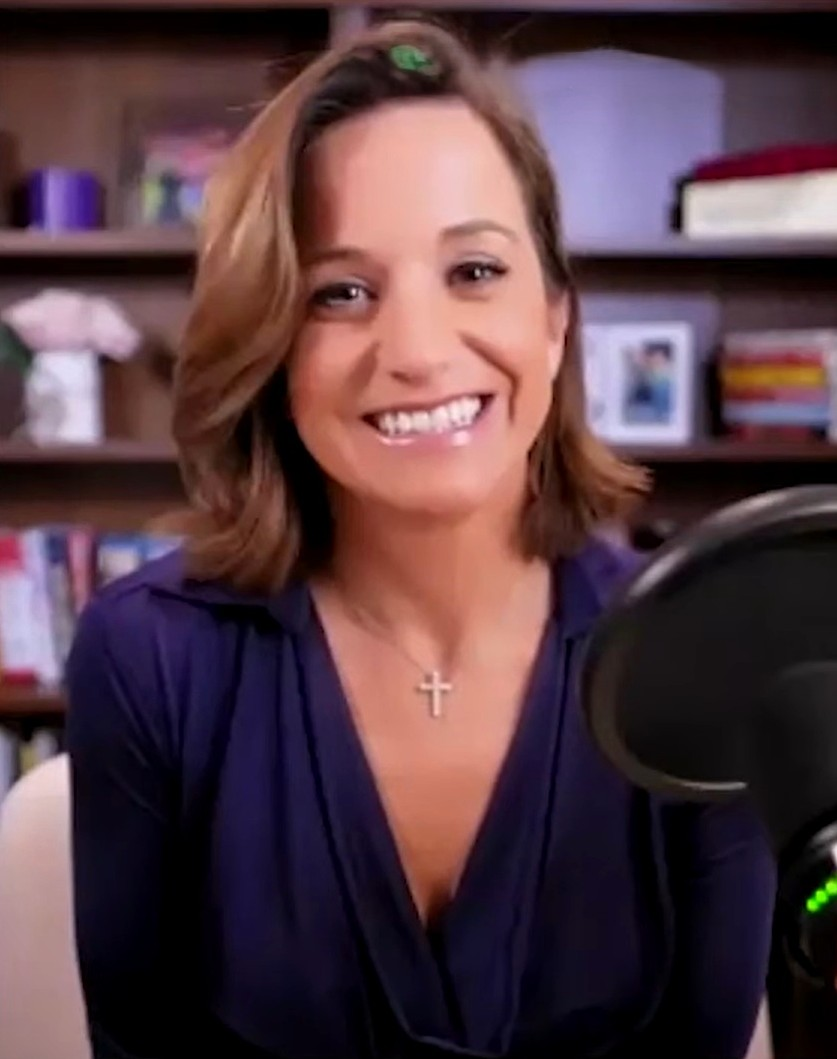
- Russini in 2025
- Born: Dianna Marie Russini; February 11, 1983 (age 43); New York City, U.S.
- Education: George Mason University
- Notable credit(s): SportsCenter; NFL Live
- Spouse: Kevin Goldschmidt (m. 2020)
- Children: 2
Association football career
- Position: Forward
Youth career
- Americans Soccer Club
- 1997–2000: Old Tappan Golden Knights
College career
Years	Team	Apps	(Gls)
2001–2004	George Mason Patriots	51	(7)

Dianna Marie Russini (born February 11, 1983) is an American sports journalist who works as a National Football League (NFL) reporter and insider.

From August 2023 to April 2026, Russini worked as a lead NFL journalist for The Athletic, part of The New York Times. She worked for ESPN as an NFL analyst and insider from July 2015 to August 2023, appearing frequently on Sunday NFL Countdown and NFL Live, and working as a SportsCenter anchor. Prior to being hired by ESPN, she worked as the main sports anchor for WRC-TV in Washington, D.C.

== Early life and education ==
Born in the Bronx, Russini grew up in Norwood, New Jersey and attended Northern Valley Regional High School at Old Tappan, where she was All-State in soccer, basketball, softball, and track. She played soccer for four seasons at George Mason University in Fairfax County, Virginia. She scored seven goals and recorded an assist in 51 appearances for George Mason.

== Career ==
At the time she joined the network, she was the youngest reporter hired at WNBC in New York City. She switched to covering sports soon after moving to Seattle as a reporter and anchor for Comcast SportsNet Northwest (CSN Northwest), having worked for News 12 Westchester and NBC stations WRC-TV, WNBC, and WVIT. In July 2015, Russini joined ESPN after Disney executives saw a sportscast of hers in Washington, D.C. She served as a SportsCenter anchor and provided sideline reporting with Tom Luginbill for ESPN's XFL Saturday afternoon games.

On August 11, 2023, it was reported that Russini would leave ESPN for The Athletic to become its lead NFL insider. At The Athletic, she made appearances on their video platforms and on podcasts.

=== Affair with Mike Vrabel ===
On April 7, 2026, Page Six published photographs of Russini and New England Patriots head coach Mike Vrabel at a resort in Sedona, Arizona. The publication raised widespread speculation online that an extramarital affair was taking place between the two. Russini denied the rumors and claimed the photos were "misleading and lack essential context". She further condemned the "media frenzy" resulting from "self-feeding speculation that is simply unmoored from the facts".

On April 11, The Athletic announced an investigation into Russini's conduct, and that she would not be reporting while the investigation was conducted. She resigned from The Athletic on April 14. On April 23, the first day of the 2026 NFL draft, Page Six published photographs of Russini and Vrabel kissing at a bar in New York City in March 2020, six months before she married her husband, Shake Shack executive Kevin Goldschmidt. In early September 2026, The New York Times described the relationship as "a clear violation of the company's standards."

Russini announced her return to sports journalism in an interview with People on November 9, with a self hosted weekly show and accompanying column.
