= Colleen Dominguez =

American journalist

- Born: December 22, 1960 (age 65); Sayre, Pennsylvania, U.S.
- Education: California State University at Los Angeles (BA)
- Occupations: Sportscaster, Journalist
- Years active: 1992-present

Colleen Dominguez (born December 22, 1960) is an American journalist originally from Sayre, Pennsylvania. Based in Los Angeles, she has been a national news correspondent on major news and sports television channels. She is a graduate of California State University at Los Angeles with a Bachelor of Arts degree in liberal studies.

== Early career ==
Dominguez worked at the Fox News magazine, Front Page (1992–1994), and then was a producer at NBC News (1994–1995). She then became a reporter for KTLA-TV in Los Angeles (1995–1996). She then was a correspondent for NBC News, reporting for The Today Show, NBC Nightly News, and MSNBC from 1996 through 2003.

== Sports reporting ==
Dominguez later transitioned to sports reporting. She joined ESPN and appeared on multiple programs including SportsCenter, Outside the Lines and Outside the Lines Nightly. She later joined rival network Fox Sports 1. However, she became unhappy with her situation there and later filed a discrimination suit against the network. The suit was later settled out of court.
