= Wendi Nix =

American anchor and sports reporter

- Born: September 17, 1974 (age 52); Murrells Inlet, South Carolina, U.S.
- Education: Union County College; Wofford College; University of Massachusetts Amherst
- Occupation: Sportscaster
- Years active: 1999–present
- Notable credit(s): WPDE (1999–01); NESN (2001–02); FSN New England (2002–03); WHDH (2003–06); ESPN (2006–2023)
- Title: College Football studio host, NFL reporter

Wendi Nix (born September 17, 1974) is an American former news anchor and sports reporter.

== Professional ==
Nix is the former co-host of ESPN's number one program, NFL Live. Nix primarily handled coverage for NFL and college football games featuring teams from the New England area. Prior to working for ESPN, Nix was a weekend sports anchor at WHDH in Boston (2003–2006) and previously reported for Fox Sports Net, NESN and WPDE in South Carolina. Nix remains an occasional guest analyst on the weekend show Sports Extra on WHDH.

== Personal ==
Nix was born in Murrells Inlet, South Carolina. She is a 1992 graduate of Socastee High School, where she was a cheerleader, a three-time homecoming queen, and a member of the track team. She has received degrees from Union County College in Cranford, New Jersey, the University of Massachusetts Amherst, and Wofford College in Spartanburg, South Carolina. At Wofford, Nix was president of the student body and captain of the golf team; she is a proud fan and supporter of the Terriers. She babysat future Las Vegas Raiders wide receiver Hunter Renfrow.

Nix was previously married to Pittsburgh Pirates general manager Ben Cherington, whom she met at UMass. She has been married to Joseph Ritchie since December 10, 2011.
