= Pete Thamel =

American sportswriter (born 1977)

- Born: November 16, 1977 (age 48); Ware, Massachusetts, U.S.
- Education: Syracuse University
- Occupation: Sports reporter

Victor Pete Thamel (born November 16, 1977) is an American sports reporter for ESPN. He previously worked for Yahoo Sports, Sports Illustrated, and The New York Times.

== Early life ==
Thamel was born in Ware, Massachusetts to Peter V. Thamel. He was the sports editor at the high school paper.

Thamel graduated from Syracuse University's S.I. Newhouse School of Public Communications in 1999, where he majored in magazine. He began his sportswriting career during college at Syracuse, he served as sports editor of The Daily Orange for three years. During his time at Syracuse, Donovan McNabb was the Orange's quarterback, and Jim Boeheim's men's basketball team reached the national championship game in 1996.

== Career ==
After graduation, Thamel began covering college basketball for The Post-Standard in Syracuse, New York.

Thamel joined The New York Times in 2003 and spent nine years there as the national college sports reporter. In 2006, The New York Times nominated him for a Pulitzer Prize for national reporting. He left the Times in 2012 for Sports Illustrated as a senior writer, covering college football and basketball. Thamel joined Yahoo Sports in 2017 and covered college sports and the NFL.

He was hired by ESPN in 2022.

Thamel is a member of the Football Writers Association of America and has won numerous FWAA writing awards. He has also won several Associated Press Sports Editors (APSE) awards, including first place for beat reporting in 2017 and breaking news in 2011. He considers Peter King at Sports Illustrated and Joe Drape from The New York Times his biggest mentors.

== Personal life ==
Thamel lives in South Boston. He got married in March 2021.
