= Jason La Canfora =

American sportswriter (born 1974)

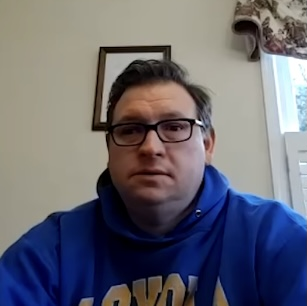
- La Canfora in 2021
- Born: April 14, 1974 (age 52)
- Occupations: Sports reporter Football commentator Podcast host Health advocate
- Spouse: Lauren

Jason La Canfora (born April 14, 1974) is an American sportswriter, former radio host, television sports analyst and health advocate.

== Career ==
=== Television ===
La Canfora joined NFL Network and NFL.com before the 2009 season and served as an NFL insider and reporter until 2012. La Canfora appeared on NFL Total Access, NFL GameDay Morning, NFL GameDay Final, and Thursday Night Kickoff. He also contributed stories and blogs to NFL.com. He replaced Adam Schefter, who left for ESPN. Before joining NFL Network, he worked ten years for The Washington Post and covered the Washington Redskins for six years. Prior to the Post, he was the Detroit Red Wings beat writer for the Detroit Free Press.

On June 1, 2012, La Canfora announced via Twitter that he would be leaving NFL Network on July 1, 2012, after his contract expired, for CBS Sports, replacing Charley Casserly on The NFL Today pregame show on Sundays as the primary NFL insider for the network. La Canfora would later leave CBS in 2022, claiming that he felt like his position went against journalism.

He joined MASN as a contributor to the game telecasts and pre- and postgame shows of the Baltimore Orioles in 2023.

=== Radio ===
From 2020 to February 2026, he co-hosted Inside Access on WJZ-FM. He drew controversy on the station for his criticisms of Orioles general manager Mike Elias, Ravens general manager Eric DeCosta and Ravens owner Steve Bisciotti. He abruptly left the afternoon show after the February 18, 2026, broadcast, confirming to The Baltimore Banner the next day that he was "definitely not on radio today!" He told The Baltimore Sun he was one year into a three-year contract and was not given any reason for his dismissal.

=== Podcast ===
La Canfora co-hosted the B-More Opinionated podcast with Jerry Coleman. It "is a hyper-local production that aims to connect with not just sports fans in the Baltimore area, but also people of all walks of life ..." The podcast went on hiatus beginning in April 2019. It was announced via the podcast's Twitter page on May 27, 2019, that the show would cease production, and the accompanying website (bmoshow.com) was shut down.

== Personal life ==
La Canfora currently resides in Baltimore, Maryland, with his wife Lauren and three children, including First Year Players' Chloe La Canfora. La Canfora was an avid Boston Red Sox fan from 2004 to 2013; he is now a Baltimore Orioles fan. La Canfora has been open about his struggles with binge eating; as spoken about on his afternoon radio show. La Canfora has partnered with local health agencies regarding gout prevention; and the importance of regular rheumatology appointments.
