= Michelle Beisner-Buck =

American journalist

- Born: October 15, 1976 (age 49); Telluride, Colorado, U.S.
- Occupations: NFL cheerleader Dancer; Actress; NFL reporter
- Spouse: Joe Buck (m. 2014)
- Children: 2

Michelle Beisner-Buck (born October 15, 1976) is an American reporter for ESPN and ABC and a former National Football League (NFL) cheerleader, dancer, and actress.

Beisner-Buck was a cheerleader for the NFL's Denver Broncos, then became an NFL Network personality who hosted NFL Weekly Countdown and NFL Network Now and served as a field reporter for NFL Total Access and NFL GameDay Morning. She currently does feature reports for Monday Night Football and its pregame show Monday Night Countdown.

== Career ==
Beisner-Buck had 15 years of dance training, and was a member of the Denver Broncos cheerleaders, serving as squad captain for four years of her six-year tenure. Beisner-Buck was the Pro Bowl representative in 1999. She traveled to Canada, South America, Hong Kong, and Australia, performing and teaching dance. Beisner-Buck was part of the USO tour in Iraq and Africa, where she emceed and danced for the American troops. Beisner-Buck also co-created, produced, sang, danced, and starred in "Dollhouse Revue", a Denver-based burlesque show featuring former Broncos cheerleaders.

Beisner-Buck acted in the feature films Any Given Sunday, Throttle, and Alice in Wasteland. In 2002, Michelle was a contestant on the NBC reality game show Dog Eat Dog with other NFL cheerleaders representing the Denver Broncos.

Beisner-Buck has worked in various reporting capacities for Fox Sports Net, Comcast, Speed Channel, ESPN, CBS, NBC and ABC. She served as a pit reporter for the Champ Car World Series on ESPN, host of "The Turbo Tour", on the Speed Channel, worked as a feature/field reporter for "The Best Damn Sports Show", host of the “Grand Prix” of Denver, co-host of "The Vista" on Altitude Network, and entertainment emcee for the Denver Nuggets, Colorado Avalanche, and the Colorado Mammoth.

== Personal life ==
She married ESPN/ABC NFL announcer Joe Buck on April 14, 2014. They have twin boys, Blake and Wyatt, born in April 2018. Joe joined Michelle at ESPN/ABC in 2022.
