= Judy Battista =

American sports journalist (born 1966)

- Born: March 10, 1966 (age 60); South Florida, U.S.
- Education: University of Miami
- Spouse: Anthony McCarron (m. 2015)

Judy Battista (born March 10, 1966) is an American sports journalist for NFL.com, where she specializes in covering professional football. Battista was the reporter who asked a question of then-New York Jets head coach Herm Edwards when Edwards launched into his monologue about how "You play to win the game."

== Early life and education ==
Battista was raised in South Florida. She is a graduate of the University of Miami, where she majored in journalism and political science. She was an occasional contributor to The Miami Hurricane, the University of Miami student newspaper.

== Career ==
Battista began working for the Miami Herald as a local news reporter in 1990, switching to sports in 1992. After her time there, she went on to work for Newsday for two years. Battista joined The New York Times in 1998. There, she covered the National Football League (NFL) for the paper. In July 2013, she left The New York Times for NFL.com.

== Personal life ==
Battista is married to fellow sports reporter, Anthony McCarron of New York Daily News.
