= Peter Schrager =

American sportscaster (born 1982)

- Born: April 20, 1982 (age 44); Freehold, New Jersey, U.S.
- Education: Emory University
- Occupation: Sports reporter
- Years active: 2006–present
- Employer: The Walt Disney Company via ESPN Inc. including ABC
- Television: Good Morning Football; Fox NFL Kickoff

Peter Schrager (born April 20, 1982) is an American sportscaster for ESPN and ABC. Previously, he worked as an analyst with Fox Sports and a sideline reporter for the NFL Network.

== Early life ==
Born in Freehold Township, New Jersey, Schrager graduated from Freehold Township High School and Emory University.

== Career ==
Schrager auditioned for ESPN's "Dream Job" contest in college but ended up writing for the company's website. He later joined FoxSports.com, in a role that included on-camera responsibilities.

In addition to his gameday coverage, he was a regular contributor to The Herd with Colin Cowherd and The Dan Patrick Show. Peter also starred alongside Kyle Brandt, Jason McCourty, and Jamie Erdahl on NFL Network's popular weekday morning show Good Morning Football. Schrager was a host of Good Morning Football from its inception until March 31, 2025.

Schrager is also the author of two books: Strength of a Champion with O. J. Brigance (2013), and the New York Times Best Seller, Out of the Blue with Victor Cruz (2012). Schrager also worked as an editorial contributor for Showtime's Inside the NFL, which earned a Sports Emmy in 2013 for Outstanding Studio Show – Weekly.

Schrager hosts an NFL podcast, The Season with Peter Schrager, through iHeartPodcasts.

Schrager joined ESPN on April 1, 2025. In this role, he will appear on Get Up, First Take, The Pat McAfee Show, NFL Live, and SportsCenter. Beginning September 10, 2026, Schrager will host his own daily show on ESPN titled Big Day with Peter Schrager.

== Personal life ==
He is married to Erica and the couple has two children, a son and a daughter.
