= Jeffri Chadiha =

American sports journalist

Jeffri Chadiha is an American sports journalist currently employed by NFL Media, having joined the Media arm of the NFL in August 2015. He previously worked for ESPN, frequently contributing to ESPN.com on the NFL. Prior to working for ESPN, he worked for Sports Illustrated, having started out at the Ann Arbor News and San Francisco Examiner. He graduated from the University of Michigan in 1993 after transferring from the University of Wyoming.
