= Jane Slater =

American sportcaster

- Born: November 7, 1980 (age 45); Rowlett, Texas, U.S.
- Education: University of Texas
- Occupation: Sports Journalist
- Employer: NFL Network

Jane Ashley Slater (born November 7, 1980) is an American journalist, who works as a reporter for the NFL Network. Slater is based in Dallas, Texas, and mainly reports on the Dallas Cowboys but has also covered the New Orleans Saints and the Tennessee Titans. She has made other appearances on NFL Network including as fill-in host for Good Morning Football.

== Early life and education ==
Slater is from Rowlett, Texas. Her grandfather, Ray Shockley, was the president of Wolf Brand Chili and later made it the official bowl of Texas. She graduated from Rowlett High School in 1999, then graduating from the University of Texas at Austin in 2004 double majoring in journalism and government.

== Career ==
Prior to joining NFL Network in 2016, Slater worked for ESPN as an anchor and sideline reporter for the Longhorn Network. She also worked on the College World Series and college football bowl games for ESPN and the SEC Network. She nearly left the covering sports/news after being let go by ESPN. She spent eight years covering news before turning her attention to covering sports which included co-hosting a radio talk show Elf and Slater for a year on KRLD-FM 105.3 The Fan in Dallas. Also, she covered Dallas area sports teams for WFAA and KTVT. She was offered a role on The Golf Channel but rejected the offer for the role for the NFL Network.

== Personal life ==
In 2019 when commenting on the Peloton advertisement controversy on Twitter, Slater said that she got a Fitbit for Christmas from an ex-boyfriend. She said she liked it until he was unaccounted for at 4 AM and because their devices were synced, she saw his activity levels were spiking. In 2021, Slater got backlash for posting an unpaid sports media opportunity on Twitter. She later posted she had three unpaid internships and had a job while at school. She is a golf aficionado.
