= Colleen Wolfe =

American sportscaster (born 1985)

- Born: January 2, 1985 (age 41); Horsham, Pennsylvania, U.S.
- Education: Drexel University
- Occupation: Sports commentator
- Employer: NFL Network
- Television: Good Morning Football Weekends; Various NFL Network programs
- Spouse: John Gonzalez

Colleen Wolfe (born January 2, 1985) is an on-air talent for the NFL Network. She hosts a variety of shows on the network including the weekend version of Good Morning Football and NFL GameDay Kickoff before Thursday Night Football.

== Early life ==
Colleen is from Horsham, Pennsylvania and graduated from Drexel University majoring in communications.

== Career ==
She worked for WTXF-TV, Comcast SportsNet Philadelphia, and Sports Radio 94 WIP-FM prior to joining NFL Network in 2014. Colleen has experience as a production assistant, associate producer, booking producer, line producer, show producer, reporter, host, writer, analyst, photographer and editor. She's worked for production companies, local news, a regional sports network and a national sports network across both broadcast and digital platforms. Wolfe was named to The Big Lead's 40 under 40 Sports Media Talent list in 2019, ranked 33rd. Wolfe was a frequent guest of the Around the NFL Podcast produced by NFL.com.

== Personal life ==
Wolfe was engaged to sportswriter John Gonzalez in 2010 and married a year later. Sometimes they appear on NFL Network's Top 10 program either together or separately. She is a Philadelphia Eagles fan. In her spare time, Wolfe rehomes rescue animals.
