= Amber Theoharis =

American broadcaster

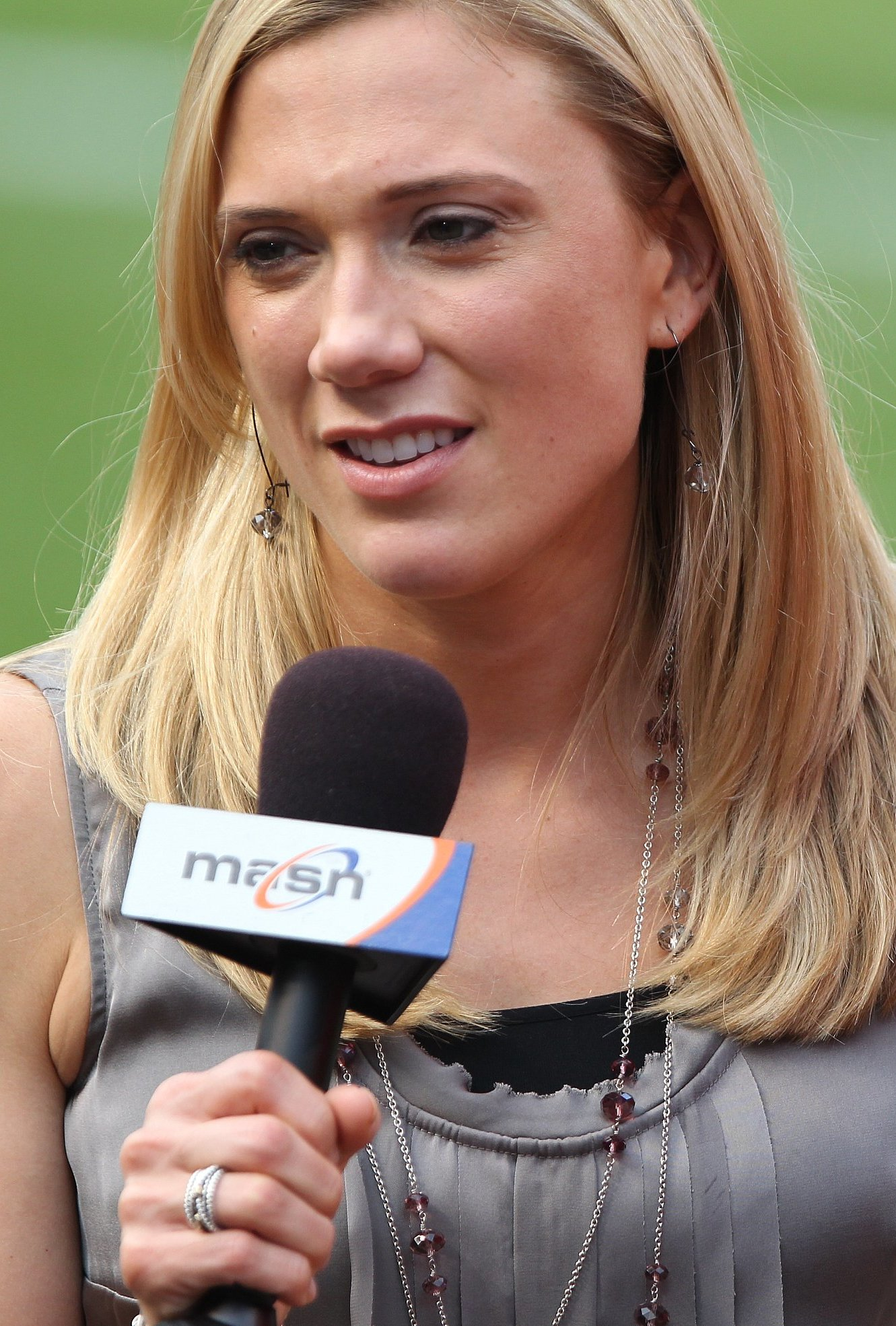
- Theoharis in 2011
- Born: September 13, 1978 (age 48)
- Education: University of Maryland
- Occupation: Las Vegas Raiders sports anchor
- Spouse: Todd Buchler
- Children: 3

Amber Theoharis (born September 13, 1978) is an American journalist, sports anchor and reporter, documentary film producer and tech executive. She is best known as a former sports anchor and reporter for the Baltimore Orioles and Baltimore Ravens, and is the former co-host for NFL Network on NFL Total Access. She currently works for the Las Vegas Raiders as the sports anchor and host of various Raiders programming.

Theoharis is a 1996 graduate of Middletown High School and of the University of Maryland. She started her media career in Salisbury, Maryland at WBOC news. and was formerly a sports talk radio host for WJZ-FM, and a sports reporter for WRC-TV in Washington, D.C.

In 2007, Theoharis joined MASN as a reporter. Some of her other duties for MASN included covering the Baltimore Ravens by hosting Ravens Xtra with Wally Williams and Bruce Laird and Playmakers, and reporting during Orioles telecasts. In 2011, instead of covering the Baltimore Orioles team on a day-to-day basis and providing live reports during and after games, she started focusing on interviews and features for the network's "Mid-Atlantic Sports Report," blogging regularly and filling in for sportscaster Jim Hunter alongside Rick Dempsey on the "O's Extra" pre- and post-game shows when Hunter shifts into the booth for play-by-play. She also hosted a sports talk show called The A-List on WJZ-FM 105.7 Baltimore and was a columnist for PressBox.

In September 2012, Theoharis left MASN to work for NFL Network on NFL Total Access, where she replaced longtime co-host, Kara Henderson, who left the network after nine years to start a family. Theoharris left NFL Network in 2019. Theoharris produced the 2020 documentary, The Weight of Gold, which was co-executive produced by Michael Phelps and aired on HBO. In June 2020, Theoharis became VP of Programming at Clickstream Corporation. Theoharris has also worked as a sports anchor and host for Fox Sports, The NFL on Westwood One and SiriusXM. In 2022 she joined the Las Vegas Raiders where she is currently the sports anchor and host of The Raiders Report, The Silver and Black Show and Raiders Gameday. Amber Theoharris also works as a Sideline Reporter for the NFL Playoffs on Westwood One.

In 2022, Theoharis joined RAADR, a technology and software development company, as Chief Brand Ambassador.

== Personal life ==
Once named Baltimore's most eligible bachelorette by Forbes, Theoharis is married to Todd Buchler and together they have two daughters and a son.
