= Lindsay Rhodes =

American sports broadcaster (born 1976)

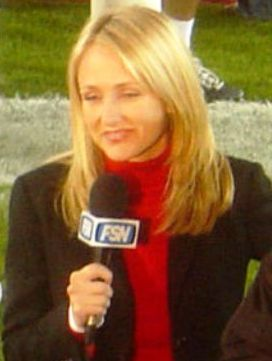
- Lindsay Rhodes
- Born: Lindsay Soto; February 25, 1976 (age 50); El Toro, California, U.S.
- Education: University of Southern California (BA)
- Occupations: Sportscaster, journalist
- Years active: 1998–present
- Spouse: Matt Rhodes (2012–present)
- Children: 2

Lindsay Rhodes (born February 25, 1976), previously known as Lindsay Soto, is an American sportscaster, journalist, and television personality who was a host and reporter for the NFL Network.

== Biography ==
Lindsay Overman-Soto graduated from El Toro High School in Lake Forest, California in 1994, where she was the sports editor for her high school yearbook. She graduated from the University of Southern California in 1998 and interned both at the USC Athletic Department and at Fox Sports Net while attending college majoring in broadcast journalism. Her first job was at an ABC affiliate in Yakima, Washington doing weekend sports and weekday news reporting. Soto later moved to KKFX, a Fox affiliate in Santa Barbara, California where she worked as a weekday sports anchor.

She began working at FSN West full-time in January 2003, and over time became "one of the most visible reporters and anchors" on that network. She has been involved in FSN's high school sports coverage since that network began such coverage in 1997. Soto appeared in a variety of roles on FSN West / FSN Prime Ticket: sideline reporter for USC/UCLA football, Los Angeles Avengers, and Los Angeles Sparks telecasts and sometimes for FSN broadcasts of the Los Angeles Lakers, Los Angeles Clippers, UCLA Bruins, USC Trojans, Los Angeles Dodgers, and Los Angeles Angels of Anaheim; host for Southern California Sports Report, L.A. Times High School Spotlight, and USC Sports Magazine show; co-hosting the High School Spotlight with Sean Farnham, and serving as the host of FSN Prime Ticket's coverage of the High School Game of the Week. She was the sideline reporter for the 2005 game in which Avengers defensive tackle Al Lucas died after suffering a spinal cord injury.

Soto served as a sportsdesk reporter for NBC Sports's coverage of the 2008 Summer Olympics, as well as a reporter for NHL on Versus and College Football on Versus.

Soto joined NFL Network in the fall of 2008 and has worked as an anchor on NFL Total Access, a reporter for NFL Network Now and a field and in-studio reporter for NFL GameDay Morning.

Soto announced a name change to Lindsay Rhodes on air March 1, 2012, and a week earlier via Twitter as a result of marrying Matt Rhodes on February 19, 2012.

== Awards ==
Wins

- Los Angeles area Emmy Award: Best Sports Reporting (2004).
- American Women in Radio and Television: GENII Award, Excellence in Sports Reporting Award (2010).

Nominations

- Los Angeles area Emmy Award: Best Sports Feature, The Michael Rivas Story (2005).
