= Ed Werder =

American sports reporter (born 1960)

- Born: May 3, 1960 (age 66); Longmont, Colorado, U.S.
- Education: University of Northern Colorado

Ed Werder (born May 3, 1960) is an American sports reporter. He is the Dallas-based bureau reporter for ESPN, Werder is a reporter for the network's NFL coverage, and contributes to shows such as SportsCenter, NFL Live, Sunday NFL Countdown and Monday Night Countdown. Werder originally worked for ESPN between 1998 and 2017, and returned in 2019.

== Early life ==
Werder graduated from the University of Northern Colorado in 1982.

== Early career ==
Prior to joining ESPN, Werder was an NFL correspondent for CNNSI on CNN's Sports Tonight and CNN's Sunday NFL Preview from its launch in 1996 until 1998. He was a Dallas Cowboys beat writer for the Dallas Morning News from 1992 to 1996 and the Fort Worth Star Telegram in 1989. He served as the NFL beat writer for the Orlando Sentinel in 1991 and was a Denver Broncos beat writer for the Boulder Daily Camera from 1984 to 1989. During that time he was also an NFL reporter for The National, from 1990 to 1991, and a correspondent for Sports Illustrated from 1987 to 1995.

While at The Dallas Morning News, Werder won several awards for chronicling the demolished relationship between Cowboys owner Jerry Jones and the then head coach Jimmy Johnson.

== ESPN and Radio ==
Hired by ESPN in 1998, Werder primarily reported on NFL news concerning the Dallas Cowboys. During this time, he appeared on such programs as Sunday NFL Countdown, Monday Night Countdown, Sportscenter, and NFL Live. In 2017, Werder was laid off from the network amid budget cuts. He joined Westwood One radio as a sideline reporter for select NFL games during the 2017 season.

In 2019, Werder returned to ESPN as a Dallas-based reporter.

== Personal ==
He is married with two children. On June 14, 2017, Werder was selected as the 2017 Dick McCann Memorial Award winner by the Professional Football Writers of America.
