= Jamie Erdahl =

American sports reporter (born 1988)

Jamie Erdahl-Buckman
- Born: Jamie Marie Erdahl; December 3, 1988 (age 37); Bloomington, Minnesota, US
- Education: American University
- Occupation: Host/Sideline Reporter
- Employer(s): NFL Network and CBS Sports

Jamie Marie Erdahl-Buckman (born December 3, 1988) is an American reporter for NFL Network and CBS Sports. She currently serves as one of the hosts of Good Morning Football on NFL Network. She was formerly the lead sideline reporter for the SEC on CBS, teaming up with Brad Nessler and Gary Danielson. Erdahl also covers the NCAA men's basketball tournament for CBS/TNT Sports. She joined the company in 2014 and contributes to CBS Sports Network as a studio host.

Erdahl worked at New England Sports Network prior to joining CBS. In 2013, she filled in on the sidelines for Jenny Dell during the Boston Red Sox season. In 2014, NESN named Erdahl the Boston Bruins rink side reporter. She also worked in studio hosting NESN's 30-minute live news shows.

== Career ==
Erdahl was a basketball and softball player at St. Olaf College. She transferred to American University in 2009 to pursue a degree in broadcasting and communications. Before graduating in December 2011, Erdahl hosted several shows for the school, including 'Eye on the Eagle', a 30-minute magazine show featuring the men's basketball team that aired on Comcast SportsNet Washington. In 2022, she joined NFL Network's Good Morning Football (GMFB) as co-host. In 2025, she hosted one of the Netflix Christmas Day NFL pregame shows.
