= Kim Jones (reporter) =

American sports journalist

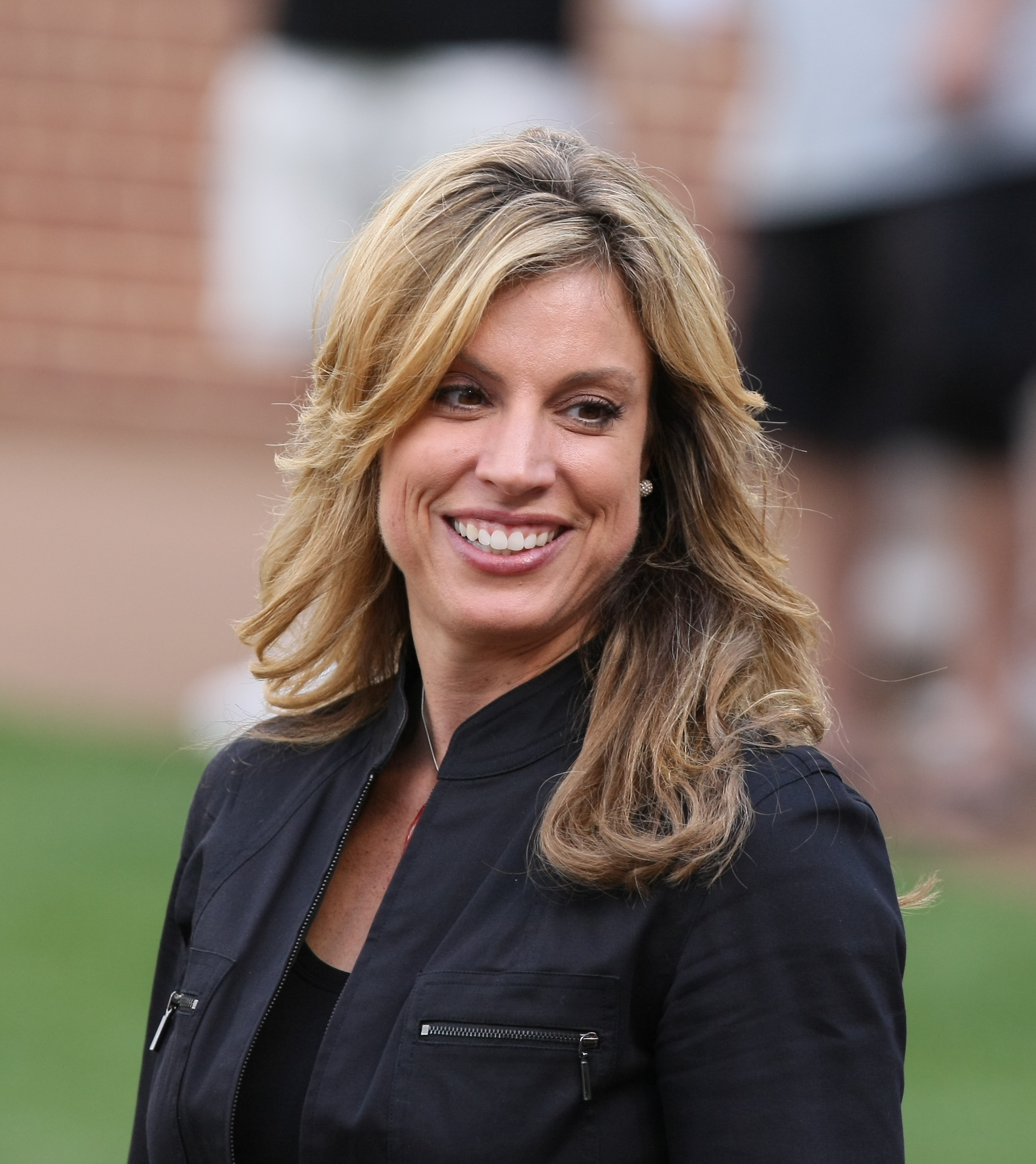
- Jones reporting at a New York Yankees game in 2009
- Born: September 7, 1969 (age 56); Dallastown, Pennsylvania, U.S.

Kimberly Alicia Jones (born September 7, 1969) is a New York City-based sports reporter. From 2005 to 2011, she was the clubhouse reporter for New York Yankees games on the YES Network. She currently works for the NFL Network, Newsday and WFAN radio in New York City.

== Early life ==
Jones graduated from Penn State University in the early 1990s with a Bachelor of Arts degree in journalism and a Master of Science degree in Exercise and Sports Science and is associated with their Center for Sports Journalism. From 2005 to 2007, she made regular appearances on the Penn State radio program Let's Talk Penn State with a segment that shared its name with her former blog: "Keeping Up With the Jones".

== Sportscasting career ==
Before joining YES, Jones was the New York Giants beat reporter and a National Football League (NFL) columnist for The Star-Ledger newspaper in Newark, New Jersey. In addition to her duties on YES and WFAN, she continued to write a Sunday NFL column for The Star-Ledger.

=== YES Network (2005-2012) ===
In 2005, Jones was hired by the YES Network to replace Suzyn Waldman as the clubhouse reporter for Yankees games, after Waldman moved on to be the game analyst for Yankees games on WCBS radio. In this role she contributed to the network's pre- and post-game shows by interviewing players and coaches. Jones also kept a blog for YESNetwork.com, entitled "Keeping Up With the Jones", that provided news and insight about the Yankees and often featured interviews with current and former players. She worked as a back-up commentator for the New York Yankees radio network WCBS. From 2010-12 she was a panelist on This Week in Football a weekly program that provided recaps of the previous week's NFL games and a look ahead to the upcoming week, with a special focus on the Giants and Jets.

During a Yankees-Twins game on May 27, 2010 at Target Field, a viral moment saw a fan take a bite out of a pork chop Jones was holding on a live in-game report.

On January 24, 2012, it was reported that Jones decided not to renew her contract with YES in order to pursue other opportunities. Jones' replacement at YES was announced in March 2012 with the signing of fellow Pennsylvania native, Meredith Marakovits.

=== NFL Network and WFAN (2012-2022) ===
On April 12, 2012, Jones joined the NFL Network as a full-time, New York-based on-air contributor.

On WFAN, Jones was a co-host of the football talk show Monday Night Live, formerly with WFAN's Ed Coleman, and presently Carl Banks. Jones has also guest hosted on WFAN for either the Boomer and Carton radio show or Benigno and Roberts when the hosts have been on vacation or unavailable. She has partnered with Chris Carlin, Sid Rosenberg, and Marc Malusis.

While covering a Washington Redskins practice on November 15, 2018, Jones suffered an aortic dissection; she was taken to the Inova Heart and Vascular Institute in Falls Church, Virginia, where she received surgery to fix the condition. Jones left NFL Network in February 2022.

=== Newsday (2022-present) ===
Following her departure from the NFL Network, in December 2022 Jones joined Newsday as their New York Giants beat reporter.

== Personal life ==
Jones has been a resident of Saddle Brook, New Jersey, since she started covering the New York Giants.
