= Aditi Kinkhabwala =

American sports journalist and reporter (born 1977)

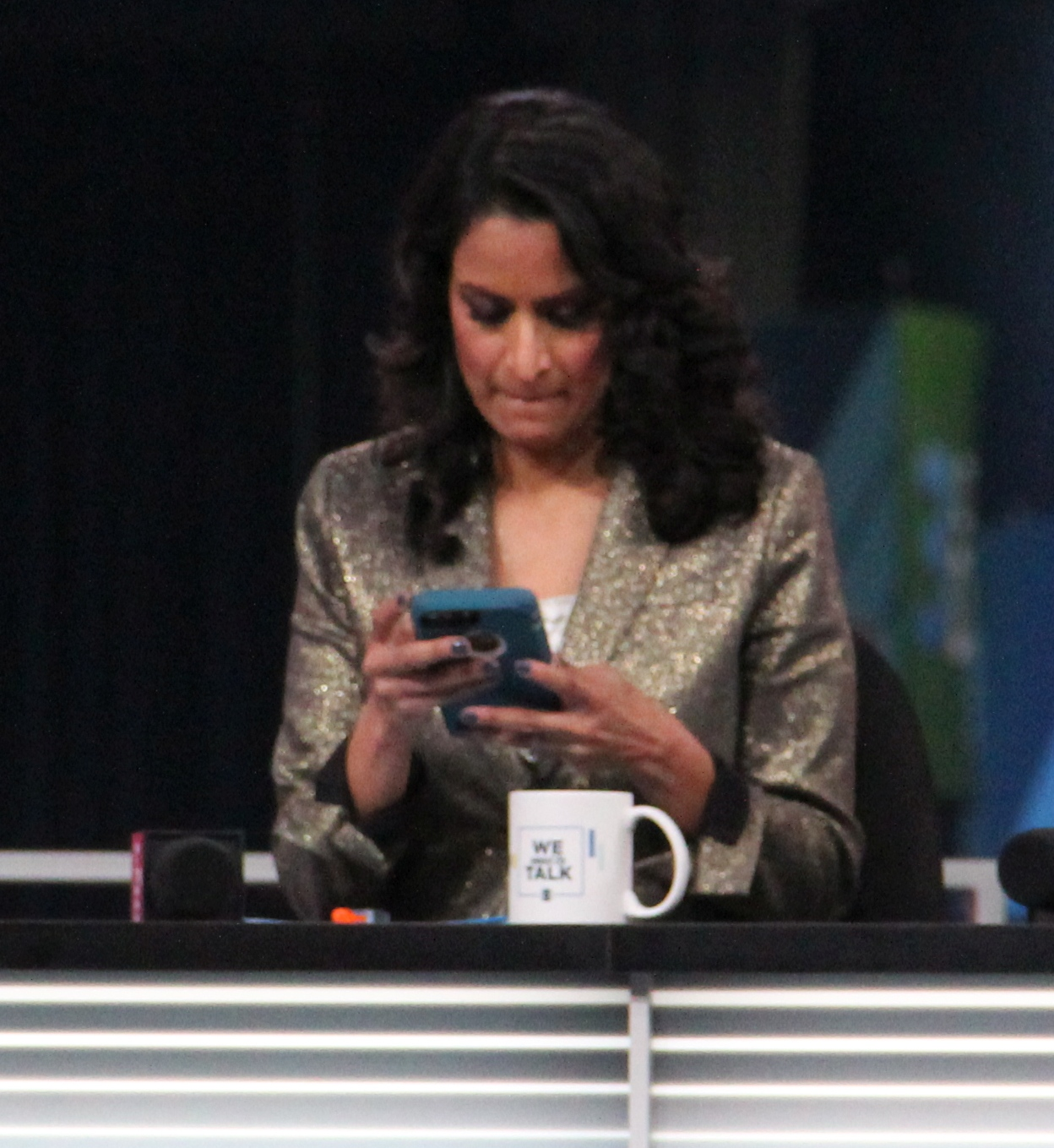
- Kinkhabwala in 2019
- Born: Aditi Kinkhabwala; December 2, 1977 (age 48); New York City, New York, U.S.
- Other name: Aditi Kinkhabwala-Wirginis
- Education: Cornell University
- Occupation: Sports reporter
- Years active: 1999–present
- Spouse: Matt Wirginis (m. 2013)

Aditi Kinkhabwala (born December 2, 1977) is an American sports journalist and sports reporter for CBS Sports.

== Early and personal life ==
Kinkhabwala is an Indian American and was born in New York City to parents who are of Indian origin. She was raised in New Jersey, and graduated from Cornell University with a degree in American Studies. She once thanked her parents for letting her pursue her dream major in college instead of forcing her to pursue a STEM based degree. In 2013, Kinkhabwala married Matt Wirginis. The couple share two children.

== Career ==
Prior to joining the NFL Network, Kinkhabwala was a journalist at the San Antonio Express-News. Kinkhabwala also was a writer for The Wall Street Journal, where she covered the New York Giants football team.

Kinkhabwala just closed a 10-year tenure with NFL Network. She is a host on CBS Sports' We Need To Talk and on both Sirius XM and local Pittsburgh radio, Kinkhabwala started her journalism career in newspapers, first covering high school football at the San Antonio Express-News and college sports at The Record in New Jersey before moving to the NFL beat at the Wall Street Journal. In April, Kinkhabwala supported Cleveland's 2021 NFL Draft coverage as a special contributor for TV, radio and website content. In 2022, after 10 years at NFL Network, Kinkhabwala announced that she was leaving NFL Network. Currently, Kinkhabwala is a contributor and reporter for NFL on CBS and the NFL Playoffs on Westwood One. Her other contributions are being a co-host on radio for 93.7 The Fan in Pittsburgh and the Football Heaven podcast.
