= Albert Breer =

American sports journalist (born 1980)

Personal information
- Born: January 26, 1980 (age 46) Sudbury, Massachusetts, U.S.
- Education: Ohio State University
- Occupation: Sports writer/reporter
- Employer: Sports Illustrated
- Updated on 6 October 2014

Albert Breer (born January 26, 1980) is an American football journalist and reporter for Sports Illustrated. Breer previously spent time covering the New England Patriots for The MetroWest Daily News where he contributed stories to the Boston Herald, and later covered the NFL for The Boston Globe, The Dallas Morning News, Sporting News and NFL Network.

In June 2018, Breer took over as writer of the Monday Morning Quarterback column from Peter King, who left Sports Illustrated for NBC Sports. He is also a content strategist for The MMQB, Sports Illustrated's NFL vertical.

== Notable incidents ==
Breer was the writer most often questioning former New England Patriots head coach Bill Belichick in the famous 2014 "We're on to Cincinnati" press conference. Breer has said that this led the NFL Network to ban him from covering the Patriots for the remainder of his contract. Breer was suspended from the NFL Network from April 25, 2016, through June 1, 2016, for undisclosed reasons and was prohibited from posting on social media during that time. Prior to his suspension he had agreed to take a position with the MMQB.

In May 2017 Breer dismissed widely reported allegations that baseball player Adam Jones was the target of racist taunts by fans at Fenway Park because, according to Breer "I've probably been to 200 games at Fenway in my life. Never heard a slur yelled at a player." The same year, Breer defended NFL front offices against allegations of "blackballing" Colin Kaepernick for his decision to protest the national anthem.
