= Kara Henderson =

American sports media personality

- Born: Kara Henderson; June 27, 1973 (age 53)
- Education: Duke University
- Occupation: NFL Network Reporter
- Spouse: Les Snead

Kara Henderson (born June 27, 1973) is an American sports media personality, most recently for the NFL Network. At NFLN, Henderson provided in-depth interviews, pregame and postgame reports and sideline reports for a variety of shows across the network including NFL Total Access, Around the League, NFL GameDay Morning and NFL GameDay Final. For the 2010 season, Henderson contributed on-site reports for both NFL Network and NFL.com for coverage of Thursday Night Football.

Henderson last appeared on NFLN in March 2012, with no explanation given on her absence. On Sunday, September 9, she confirmed that she had left broadcasting to get married and raise her son. She was replaced by Amber Theoharis.

Kara graduated cum laude from Duke University, where she majored in political science.

Kara was formerly an anchor and reporter for Fox Sports Net New England. She began her career as a production assistant at ESPN and later ABC News. Her on-air career began at NESN in 1998 as the co-host of NESN's "Front Row". From 2000 to 2003, she worked at CNN as a reporter.

In the fall of 2012, Henderson married Los Angeles Rams general manager Les Snead. She has a son Tate from a previous marriage along with a stepson, Logan, and stepdaughter, Cannon.
