= Michael Silver (sportswriter) =

American sportswriter

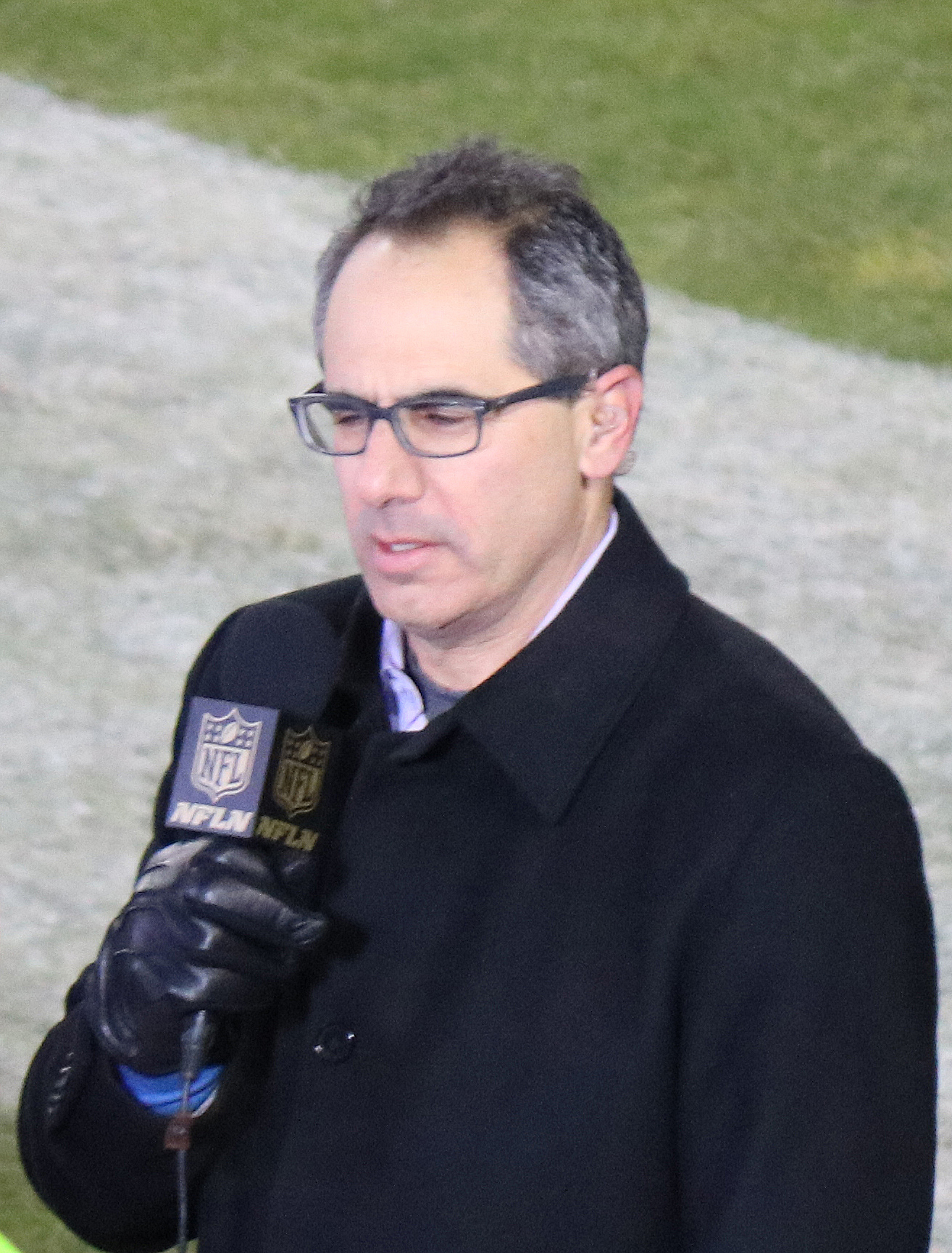
Silver in 2015

Michael Silver is an American sportswriter and television analyst who currently works for The Athletic. He previously worked for Sports Illustrated, Yahoo Sports, NFL Network and the San Francisco Chronicle.

== Biography ==
=== Early life and education ===
Silver was born in San Francisco in 1966 and raised in Los Angeles. He graduated from the University of California, Berkeley.

=== Career ===
Silver began his career as a sportswriter and columnist for the Santa Rosa Press Democrat, where he covered the San Francisco 49ers and Golden State Warriors from 1990 to 1994. He also covered the 49ers for the Sacramento Union and served as a correspondent for Pro Football Weekly and The Sporting News.

Silver started work at Sports Illustrated in November 1994, eventually becoming a senior writer there. He was one of the magazine's lead football writers, having authored game stories for Super Bowl XXIX through XLI and personal profiles of famous sports characters. He has also written articles for GQ and Rolling Stone.

Silver began working for Yahoo Sports at the beginning of the 2007 NFL season and was hired by NFL Network in 2013. He left NFL Network in 2021 and started working for Bally Sports in October of that year. In 2022, he joined the San Francisco Chronicle to cover the 49ers and the NFL. In 2024, Silver joined The Athletic as an NFL Senior Writer.

== Published works ==
- Rice with Jerry Rice (St. Martin's Press, 1996)
- Walk on the Wild Side with Dennis Rodman (Delacorte Press, 1997)
- All Things Possible with Kurt Warner (HarperSanFrancisco, 2000)
- Golden Girl with Natalie Coughlin (Rodale Press, 2006)
- The Why Is Everything: A Story of Football, Rivalry and Revolution (W. W. Norton & Company, 2024)

== Awards ==
Silver, who lists professional football, professional basketball, tennis, and college softball as his favorite sports to cover, has received numerous writing awards from several organizations, including the Pro Football Writers of America, the Associated Press Sports Editors and the Pro Basketball Writers of America.
