= Tom Pelissero =

American journalist

Tom Pelissero is an American journalist who works as an American football reporter for Netflix and The Ringer.

== Career ==
A native of Edina, Minnesota, and a graduate of Boston College, Pelissero began his journalism career in 2003, reporting part-time on the Minnesota Vikings for local radio station KFAN. He worked there for two years before moving to Eau Claire, Wisconsin to work for the Eau Claire Leader-Telegram. One of his stories for the Leader-Telegram led to him joining the Green Bay Press-Gazette, where his work covering the Green Bay Packers saw him rise to the position of assistant sports editor, as well as continuing to cover the Vikings for 1500 ESPN Twin Cities.

In 2013, Pelissero began covering the NFL for USA Today, where he was part of a team that won an Associated Press Sports Editors Top 10 award. At the same time, he hosted radio shows on SiriusXM NFL Radio and 1500 ESPN Twin Cities. He joined NFL Network in July 2017. In July 2026, he was terminated as part of a mass layoff following ESPN's acquisition of NFL Network. In August 2026, Pelissero signed a multiyear deal with Netflix and The Ringer, serving as a sideline reporter and NFL insider for Netflix Gameday and co-hosting The Ringer NFL Show.

== Personal life ==
Pelissero's wife, Sara, is a former producer for Minnesota television station KARE 11. They have two children.
