= Jeff Darlington =

American sportswriter (born 1981)

- Born: November 10, 1981 (age 44); Elizabeth, New Jersey, U.S.
- Education: University of Florida
- Occupations: Reporter for ESPN, previously a reporter for NFL Network and NFL.com

Jeff Darlington (born November 10, 1981) is an American television reporter with ESPN.
