= Steve Wyche =

American sports reporter (born 1966)

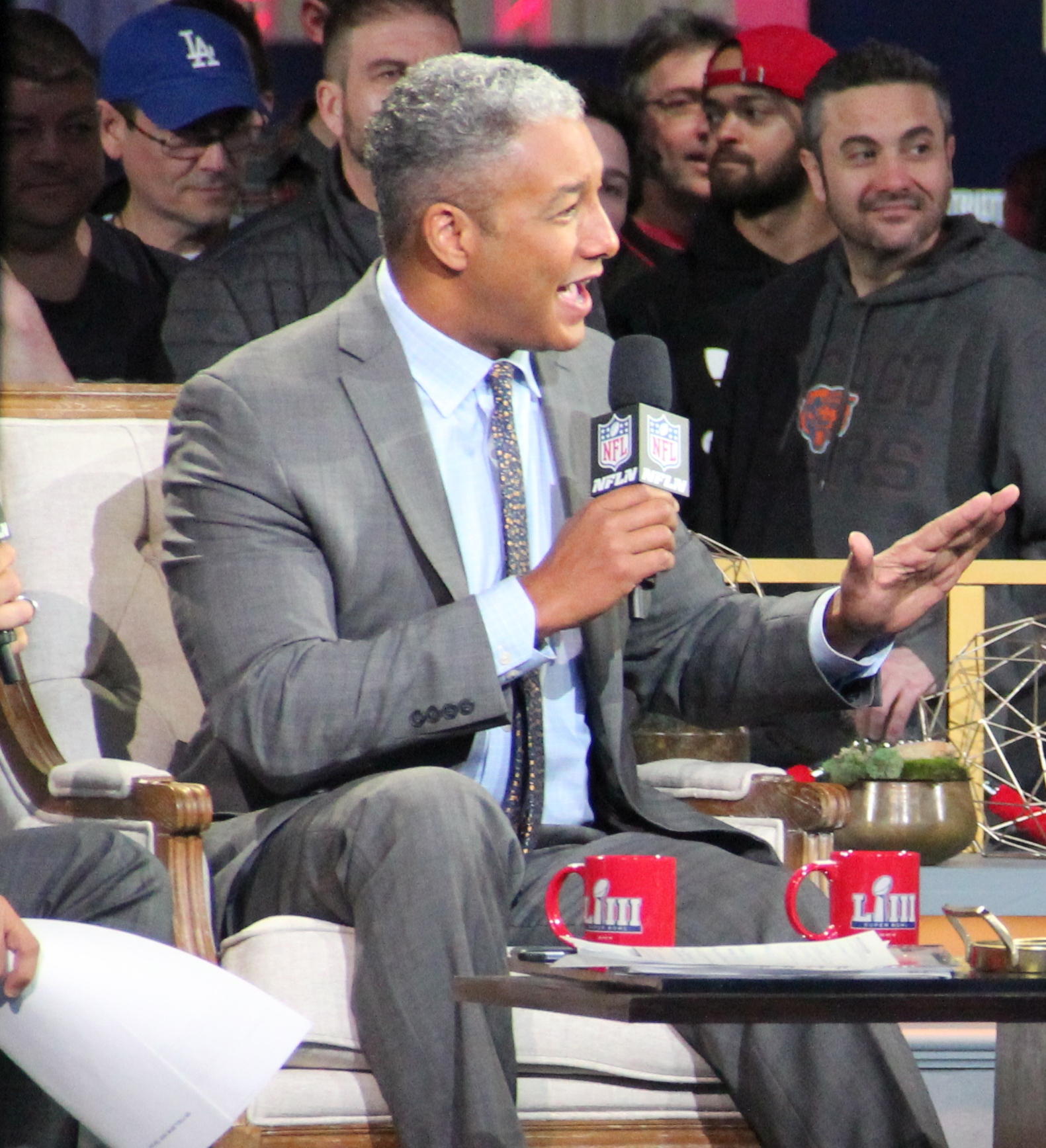
- Wyche in 2019
- Born: May 28, 1966 (age 60); Minneapolis, Minnesota, U.S.
- Occupation: Reporter

Steve Wyche (/waɪʃ/; born May 28, 1966) is an American reporter for NFL Network. He appeared in the weekday morning show NFL AM.

== Early years ==
Wyche is a native of Minneapolis, Minnesota. He played quarterback, running back and outside linebacker in high school and went on to play college football at the University of Missouri. He earned a Bachelor of Arts in Journalism from Howard University in 1989.

== Career ==
In 2008, Wyche joined NFL Network as a reporter and the senior writer for NFL.com. Prior to working at NFL Network, he spent four years as the beat writer of the Atlanta Journal-Constitution covering the Atlanta Falcons. In 2012, he would appear in NFL Network's new weekday morning show NFL AM. In 2016, he broke the story of Colin Kaepernick's protesting during the national anthem.
