= Ian Rapoport =

American journalist (born 1980)

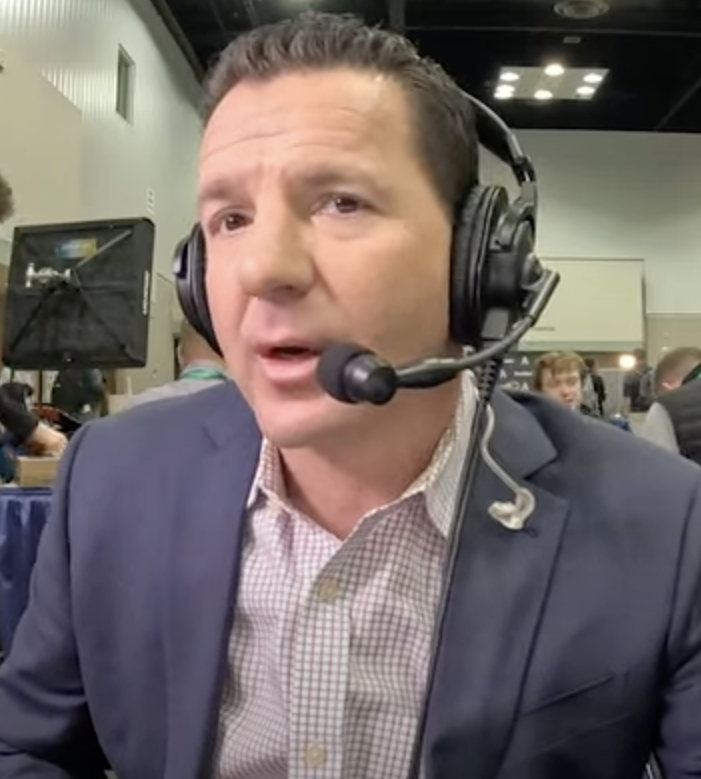
- Rapoport in 2024
- Born: January 9, 1980 (age 46); Boston, Massachusetts, U.S.
- Education: Columbia University
- Occupations: Sportswriter, sports analyst

Ian Rapoport (born January 9, 1980) is an American sportswriter, pundit, and television analyst who primarily covers the National Football League (NFL).

== Early life ==
Rapoport was born in Boston and grew up in Chappaqua, New York. He was a college rower at Columbia University where he majored in history.

== Career ==
Rapoport started his career for the Jackson Clarion-Ledger in 2004 covering the Mississippi State Bulldogs. He moved on to The Birmingham News in 2006 to cover the Alabama Crimson Tide. As reported on Pardon My Take, he applied for a job with the Boston Herald on the basis that he would cover Bill Belichick in the same manner he covered Nick Saban. After receiving the job, he served as a Patriots beat reporter for the Boston Herald for three seasons starting in 2009. Rapoport joined the NFL Network in 2012.

== Personal life ==
Rapoport is Jewish. He and his wife Leah, whom he married in 2009, have two sons named Max and Jude. Rapoport is a fan of the New York Mets and threw a ceremonial first pitch at a home game in 2021.
