= Tom Waddle =

American football player (born 1967)

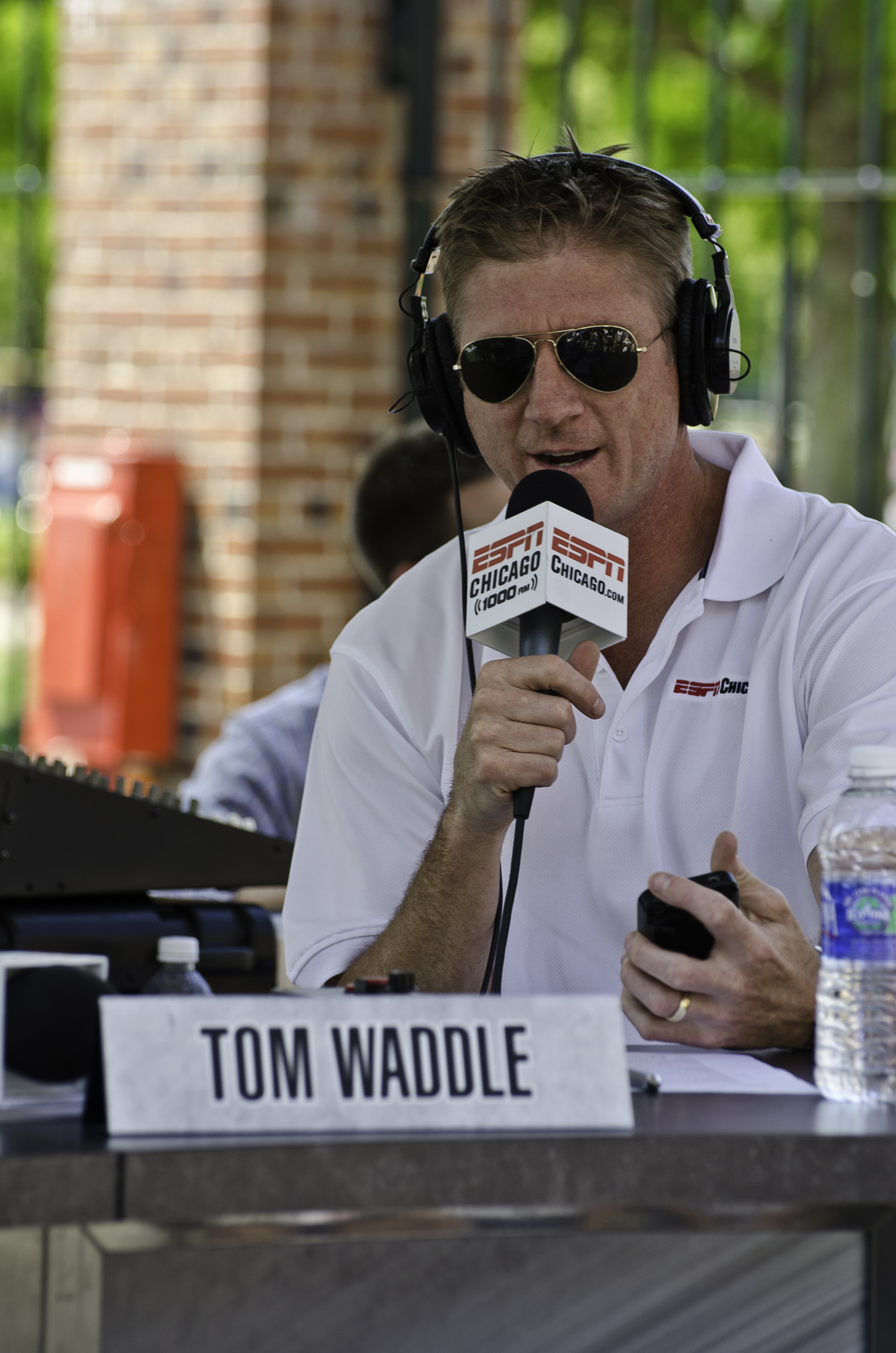
- Waddle at Navy Pier in 2012

No. 87
- Position: Wide receiver

Personal information
- Born: February 20, 1967 (age 59); Cincinnati, Ohio, U.S.
- Listed height: 6 ft 0 in (1.83 m)
- Listed weight: 185 lb (84 kg)

Career information
- High school: Archbishop Moeller (Cincinnati)
- College: Boston College
- NFL draft: 1989: undrafted

Career history
- Chicago Bears (1989–1994); Cincinnati Bengals (1995)*
- * Offseason or practice squad member only

Awards and highlights
- Nils V. "Swede" Nelson Award (1988); First-team All-East (1988)

Career NFL statistics
- Receptions: 173
- Receiving yards: 2,109
- Touchdowns: 9
- Stats at Pro Football Reference

Gregory Thomas Waddle (born February 20, 1967) is an American former professional football player who was a wide receiver in the National Football League (NFL). Waddle is currently a co-host of "Waddle and Silvy" on ESPN 1000, and a football analyst for WLS-TV in Chicago. He also appears on Pro Football Weekly and NFL Network. He spent his entire six-year career with the Chicago Bears. He attended Boston College.

== College career ==
Waddle was a receiver for the Boston College Eagles. He is sixth all-time in career receptions with 139, and amassed 1,956 yards and six touchdowns. Waddle finished his collegiate career first on the school's all-time list for receptions in a season with 70 in 1988, and is tied for first in all-time receptions in a single game with 13 against TCU in 1988. Waddle was a first-team All-East selection in 1988 and made appearance in the Japan Bowl. His achievements at BC resulted in his induction into the Boston College Varsity Club Athletic Hall of Fame in 1998. He also played alongside Doug Flutie's younger brother, Darren Flutie.

- 1985: 8 catches for 122 yards.
- 1986: 18 catches for 160 yards and 1 touchdown.
- 1987: 43 catches for 781 yards.
- 1988: 70 catches for 902 yards and 5 touchdowns.

== Professional career ==
Pre-draft measurables
| Height | Weight | 40-yard dash | 10-yard split | 20-yard split | 20-yard shuttle | Vertical jump |
|---|---|---|---|---|---|---|
| 5 ft 11 7/8 in (1.83 m) | 173 lb (78 kg) | 4.81 s | 1.64 s | 2.89 s | 4.19 s | 31.0 in (0.79 m) |

In 1989, the Chicago Bears signed Waddle as an undrafted free agent. During his first two years with the Bears, he struggled to make an impact as a receiver. Waddle lacked the size and speed to distinguish himself from other Bears wide receivers and remained on the lower rungs of the team's depth chart. He received a chance to start in 1991 after the Bears lost starters due to injuries. In a nationally televised Monday night game against the Jets, he made eight catches for 102 yards in an overtime win. In Chicago's wild card playoff loss to Dallas (17–13), Waddle was the Bears' sole standout performer on the offensive side of the ball, catching nine passes for 104 yards and a touchdown. His performance established him as a mainstay in the Bears lineup and clinched him a spot on the famed All-Madden team.

In 1992, Waddle began the season as a starting wide receiver and became a fan favorite. In the opener against the Detroit Lions, he caught a last second game-winning touchdown pass from Jim Harbaugh. Later in a week 4 victory over the Falcons, he managed to outrun Deion Sanders into the endzone for a score. Waddle missed the final four games of the season because of injury.

After finishing the 1992 season with a record of 5–11, coach Mike Ditka was fired and Dallas Cowboys defensive coordinator Dave Wannstedt was brought in to replace him. After leading the Bears in receiving yards and receptions in 1993, Wannstedt demoted Waddle in favor of faster receivers. Later that year, he suffered a concussion and a partially torn knee ligament from an illegal hit by Tampa Bay Buccaneers defensive back Thomas Everett. The following off-season, the Bears offered Waddle a choice between a guaranteed contract at the league minimum salary, and a more lucrative deal that would be dissolved if he were cut. He instead attended the Cincinnati Bengals' training camp, but elected to retire, as he felt that his lingering leg injuries no longer allowed him to compete at the professional level.

== Broadcasting career ==
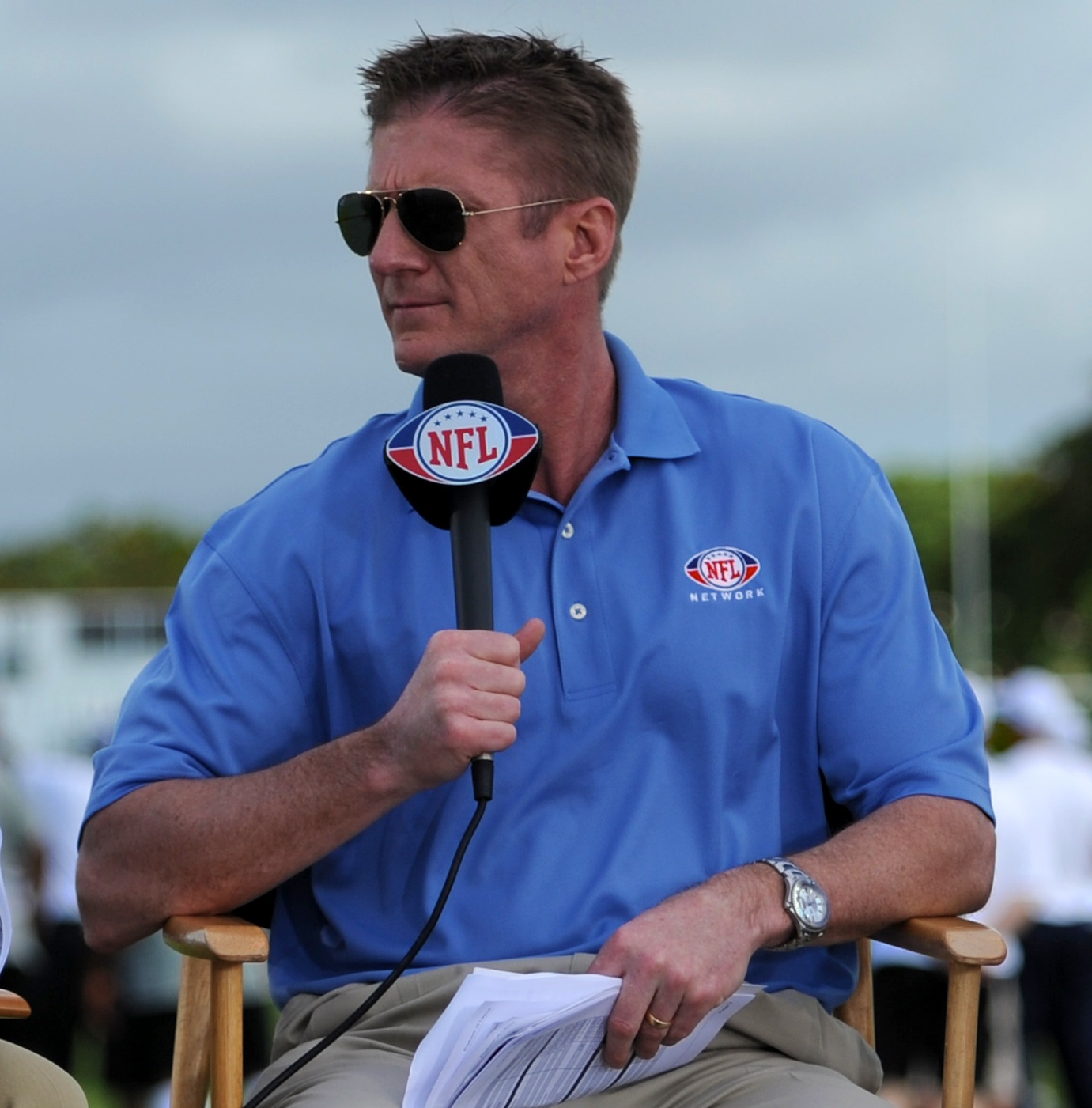
Waddle in 2012.

=== Television ===
After retiring from football, Waddle began working on WFLD FOX 32 as the host of weekend football-oriented programs. Waddle covered previews and post-game shows for Bears games. During this time, he also began to work as a weekend and fill-in sports anchor. He later worked with Corey McPherrin to host and the Chicago Bears Gameday Live, Fox Kickoff Sunday and The Final Word.

Waddle's joined WLS ABC 7 in August 2013 after his contract expired with WFLD. Waddle is a regular contributor on the station's morning show, and continues to provide analysis on Bears-themed programming.

Waddle also began working with the NFL Network in Los Angeles as a gameday analyst in 2007. In 2013, he began working as a guest analyst for Colin Cowherd's Colin's New Football Show.

=== Radio ===
In 1997, Waddle began co-hosting Sports Central with David Kaplan on weeknights. This partnership ended in 2007 with his move to WMVP ESPN Radio 1000.

Waddle was paired with Marc "Silvy" Silverman and their show was expanded to four hours to include weekly, one-hour in-studio segments with WLS-TV sports anchor Mark Giangreco. Dan Katz of Barstool Sports makes regular call-in appearances every Thursday afternoon during the program. During football season, Waddle and Silverman hosted "The Jay Cutler Show" with Chicago Bears quarterback Jay Cutler on Mondays or Tuesdays following each Bears game until Cutler's departure from Chicago.

On several occasions in 2008 and 2009, Waddle appeared as a fill-in host, alongside Mike Greenberg, on Mike and Mike in the Morning on ESPN Radio. He and Silverman have also hosted The Scott Van Pelt Show.

=== Other media ===
Waddle appears weekly during the football season on Pro Football Weekly. He writes a weekly article about the Bears for the Northwest Herald of McHenry County, Illinois.

He was also a color commentator during FSN Chicago/CSN Chicago broadcasts of Northern Illinois Huskies football games alongside David Kaplan and for a limited number of Chicago Rush games aired on the NFL Network.

== Personal life ==
Waddle lives in Lake Forest with his wife, Cara and 4 daughters. Waddle's wife Cara is the daughter of former Boston Patriots wide receiver and AFL Hall of Famer Gino Cappelletti. His oldest daughter Georgia was a member of the Northwestern Wildcats soccer team.
