= NFL on Prime Video =

Branding for NFL games broadcast on Amazon Prime Video

- Current TNF logo, in use since 2022
- Genre: American football game telecasts
- Directed by: Pierre Moossa
- Presented by: Commentators: Al Michaels (play-by-play); Kirk Herbstreit (color commentator); Reporters: Kaylee Hartung (sideline); Rules analyst: Terry McAulay; Studio: Charissa Thompson; Tony Gonzalez; Ryan Fitzpatrick; Andrew Whitworth; Richard Sherman; Marshawn Lynch; Sam Schwartzstein; James Palmer (insider); Taylor Rooks
- Opening theme: "Prime Video Sports Theme"
- Composer: Pinar Toprak
- Country of origin: United States
- Original language: English
- No. of seasons: 10 (through 2026 season)
- No. of episodes: 16 per season (plus 1 preseason game)

Production
- Executive producer: Fred Gaudelli
- Producer: Mark Teitelman
- Production locations: Various NFL stadiums
- Camera setup: Multi-camera
- Running time: 210 minutes or until game ends (inc. adverts)
- Production companies: National Football League; NBC Sports (2016–2017 and 2022–present); Prime Video Originals

Original release
- Network: Amazon Prime Video
- Release: September 28, 2017 – present
- Network: Twitch
- Release: September 27, 2018 – present

Related
- Thursday Night Football

The NFL on Prime Video is the branding used for broadcasts of National Football League (NFL) games on the subscription video on-demand over-the-top streaming and rental service Amazon Prime Video and on sister service Twitch as part of Prime Video Sports. Amazon currently holds exclusive streaming rights for Thursday Night Football.

Along with Prime Video, the games are also simulcast for free on Prime Video's Twitch channel and broadcast on local over-the-air networks in the markets of the playing teams.

== Overview ==
=== Thursday Night Football ===
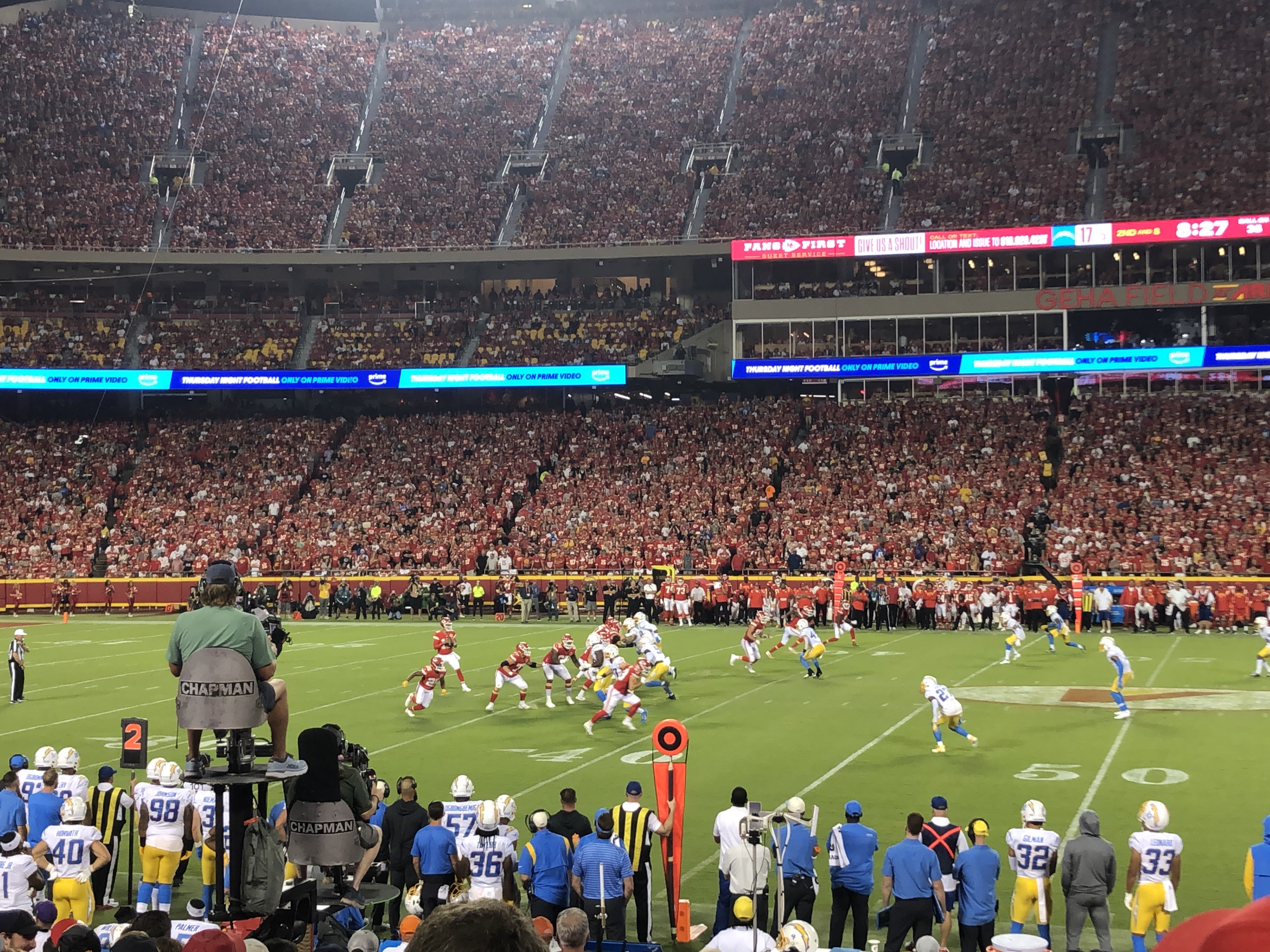
The Chargers and Chiefs playing in the first Thursday Night Football game to exclusively broadcast nationally on Prime Video on September 15, 2022.

On April 4, 2017, it was announced that Amazon had acquired non-exclusive streaming rights to the 10 broadcast television games for the 2017 season over their Amazon Prime Video service, under a deal valued at $50 million, a five-fold increase over the $10 million paid by Twitter. The streams were exclusive to paid Prime subscribers. Amazon planned several special features for its inaugural game, including broadcasting alternate feeds with Spanish, Portuguese, and a secondary English broadcast featuring soccer commentators Ross Dyer and Tommy Smyth (intended for international viewers unfamiliar with the rules and terminology of American football), and a pre-show hosted by Tiki Barber and Curtis Stone.

Amazon renewed its digital rights for the 2018 and 2019 seasons; in contrast to 2017 in which the games required a Prime subscription, for 2018 and 2019, Amazon also carried game coverage for free on its live streaming platform Twitch. Alongside the main Fox feed, British English, and Spanish options, the Amazon Prime streams offered an alternate commentary feed featuring ESPN anchor Hannah Storm and NFL Network chief correspondent Andrea Kremer — the first all-female commentary team in NFL history. The Twitch streams offer access to the service's standard chat room (along with special football-themed emotes), an interactive extension, and co-streams featuring prominent personalities, while streams on Amazon Fire devices offer integration with the X-Ray feature to access statistics and other content.

On April 29, 2020, Amazon renewed its digital rights through the 2022 season, maintaining the 11 TNF simulcasts and digital content. For its simulcasts, Amazon replaced the British feed with a new "Scout's Feed" with extended analysis by Bucky Brooks and Daniel Jeremiah, and NFL Next Live on Twitch (with viewer interactivity). For the 2020 season, Prime Video offered multiple announcer options; NFL Next on Prime Video, live and on-demand on Tuesday nights, hosted by Chris Long, Kay Adams, Andrew Hawkins, and James Koh; X-Ray, offering real-time access to live statistics and insights; and new shows on Twitch, including The NFL Comments Box and The NFL Machine.

In March 2021, Amazon acquired rights to become the exclusive broadcaster of Thursday Night Football initially starting with the 2023 season and running through 2033, paying approximately $1 billion per year to become the first streaming service to exclusively carry a package of NFL games. Regular season games on Thursday nights will increase from 12 to 15 per year, and the package will also include one preseason game per year. Amazon will now be producing its own football game broadcasts, after previously picking up feeds from other networks. The deal also includes pre-game, halftime, and post-game shows, plus in-game highlights and original NFL programming. Because Prime Video is a subscription streaming service, the NFL will require Amazon to have its games syndicated on over-the-air television stations in the local markets of the competing teams. For example, if a Patriots-Steelers game airs on TNF, it needs to air on one TV station in Pittsburgh, and on one TV station in Boston. (The 2023 game between both aforementioned teams aired on WPXI in Pittsburgh, and on WFXT in Boston.) A couple months later, it was announced that Prime Video would take over TNF a year earlier than originally announced in 2022, making the deal 11 years. The annual NFL Kickoff Game and the annual primetime game on Thanksgiving night (both of which take place on Thursday nights) aren't part of the TNF package, and therefore, air nationally on NBC instead via its Sunday Night Football Package.

=== Other regular season games ===
On April 29, 2020, as part of Amazon's renewal of its digital rights through the 2022 season, Amazon acquired the exclusive international rights to one late-season game produced by CBS), it would be the first game to only be nationally available on a streaming platform. Prime Video, along with Twitch, Verizon, the NFL app, and the two teams' local stations, aired this game on December 26, 2020, featuring the San Francisco 49ers and Arizona Cardinals. It averaged 4.8 million viewers. The Amazon exclusive game did not return for the 2021 season.

Beginning with the 2023 season, Prime Video has broadcast an NFL game on Black Friday, the day after Thanksgiving. Like with the traditional TNF games, the Black Friday game also needs to air on local television stations in both teams' media markets (the 2023 Black Friday game aired on WNYW in New York City, and on WFOR-TV in Miami).

Beginning with the 2025 season, if Christmas Day falls on a Thursday, Prime Video will air its traditional TNF game on Christmas night. For example, Christmas Day will take place on a Thursday in 2025, and Prime Video will air its traditional TNF game after the Netflix Christmas doubleheader is finished. The Christmas game on Prime Video also needs to be simulcast on local television stations in both teams' media markets. (The 2025 Christmas night game aired on KMGH in Denver and on KSHB-TV in Kansas City.)

=== Playoff programming ===
In October 2020, Amazon acquired the rights to stream its first NFL playoff game on Prime Video as part of its digital rights to the league: a simulcast of one of CBS's NFC Wild Card games. This game eventually was the one on January 10, 2021, between the Chicago Bears and the New Orleans Saints. The game was also available on Nickelodeon.

On January 16, 2022, Amazon streamed its second NFL playoff game between the San Francisco 49ers and Dallas Cowboys. It was also a simulcast of a CBS/Nickelodeon broadcast.

In 2024, Amazon signed a multi-year agreement to stream one Wild Card playoff game per season. Like with the regular season games, the Wild Card playoff game also needs to be simulcast on local television stations in both teams' media markets (the January 2025 Wild Card game aired on WPXI in Pittsburgh, and on WMAR-TV in Baltimore).

=== Other programming ===
The 2020 NFL Holiday Blitz on Prime Video featured a week-long slate of original content with celebrities and athletes including Action Bronson, Quavo, Cari Champion, Victor Cruz and Chad Johnson.

== Results ==
=== Games aired by Prime Video before its exclusive rights acquisition of TNF ===
Year	Week	Date	Visiting team	Final score	Host team	Stadium	Simulcast	Game notes
2020	16	December 26	San Francisco 49ers	20–12	Arizona Cardinals	State Farm Stadium	KNTV (San Francisco); KSAZ-TV (Phoenix)	49ers–Cardinals rivalry Exclusive telecast produced by CBS
2021	Wild Card	January 10	Chicago Bears	9–21	New Orleans Saints	Mercedes-Benz Superdome	National CBS	Simulcast of CBS coverage Alternate presentation on Nickelodeon
2022	Wild Card	January 16	San Francisco 49ers	23–17	Dallas Cowboys	AT&T Stadium	National CBS	49ers–Cowboys rivalry Simulcast of CBS coverage Alternate presentation on Nickelodeon

== Game announcers ==
=== Current announcers ===
- Al Michaels – play-by-play (2022–present)
- Kirk Herbstreit – color commentator (2022–present)
- Kaylee Hartung – sideline reporter (2022–present)
- Terry McAulay – rules analyst (2022–present)
- Charissa Thompson – pregame host (2022–present)
- Tony Gonzalez – pregame analyst (2022–present)
- Ryan Fitzpatrick – pregame analyst (2022–present)
- Andrew Whitworth – pregame analyst (2022–present)
- Richard Sherman – pregame analyst (2022–present)
- Marshawn Lynch – contributor (2022–present)
- Taylor Rooks – contributor (2022–present)
- David Chang - contributor (2023–present)
- Sam Schwartzstein – analytics expert (2023–present)
- James Palmer – insider (2026–present)

=== Former announcers ===
- Kay Adams – fill-in play-by-play (2021)
- Albert Breer - insider (2024)
- Bucky Brooks – Scout's Feed on Prime Video (2020–2021)
- Sherree Burress – Saturday sideline reporter (2020)
- Andrew Catalon – Saturday play-by-play (2020)
- Terrell Davis – Prime Video studio postgame analyst (2020)
- Daniel Jeremiah – Scout's Feed on Prime Video (2020–2021)
- Dude Perfect – alternate broadcast announcers (2022–2023, select games)
- Maurice Jones-Drew – Prime Video studio pregame/halftime analyst (2020)
- Rhett Lewis – Prime Video studio host (2021)
- James Lofton – Saturday color commentator (2020)
- Beth Mowins – fill-in play-by-play (2018)
- Michael Smith – insider (2022–2023)
- Joy Taylor – Scout's Feed on Prime Video (2020–2021)
- Derek Rae – UK English Feed play-by-play on Prime Video (2017–2019)
- Tommy Smyth – UK English Feed color commentator on Prime Video (2017–2019)
- Ross Dyer – UK English Feed fill-in play-by-play on Prime Video (2017)
- Hannah Storm – alternate broadcast announcer (2022; select games); play-by-play (2018–2021)
- Andrea Kremer – alternate broadcast announcer (2022; select games); game analyst (2018–2021)
- LeBron James – alternate broadcast announcers (2022–2023; select games)
- Maverick Carter – alternate broadcast announcer (2022–2023; select games)
- Paul Rivera – alternate broadcast announcer (2022–2023; select games)
- Ian Rapoport – insider (2025)

== See also ==
- NASCAR on Prime Video
- NBA on Prime Video
- NHL on Prime Video
- List of Amazon Prime Video original programming
- History of the National Football League on television
