= Hugh Douglas (American football) =

American football player (born 1971)

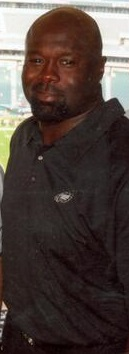
- Douglas in 2008

No. 53, 99, 58
- Position: Defensive end

Personal information
- Born: August 23, 1971 (age 55); Mansfield, Ohio, U.S.
- Listed height: 6 ft 2 in (1.88 m)
- Listed weight: 281 lb (127 kg)

Career information
- High school: Mansfield
- College: Central State
- NFL draft: 1995: 1st round, 16th overall pick

Career history
- New York Jets (1995–1997); Philadelphia Eagles (1998–2002); Jacksonville Jaguars (2003); Philadelphia Eagles (2004)

Awards and highlights
- NFL Defensive Rookie of the Year (1995); First-team All-Pro (2000); Second-team All-Pro (2002); 3× Pro Bowl (2000–2002); PFWA All-Rookie Team (1995); Philadelphia Eagles Hall of Fame

Career NFL statistics
- Tackles: 358
- Sacks: 80.0
- Forced fumbles: 13
- Fumble recoveries: 5
- Interceptions: 1
- Defensive touchdowns: 1
- Stats at Pro Football Reference

Hugh Lamont Douglas (born August 23, 1971) is an American former professional football player who was a defensive end in the National Football League (NFL). His playing career included stints with the New York Jets, Philadelphia Eagles (twice), and the Jacksonville Jaguars. In his first season in 1995, Douglas was named Defensive Rookie of the Year by the Associated Press.

Douglas currently hosts the 94.1 WIP Midday Show in Philadelphia. He previously served as a football analyst for ESPN.

== Early life ==
Douglas was born in Mansfield, Ohio and attended Mansfield Senior High School.

== College career ==
At Central State University in Wilberforce, Ohio, Douglas majored in elementary education and was a two-time NAIA Division I All-American, made 42 sacks in 32 games in a three-year career, turned in 13 multiple-sack games, and helped lead his team to an NAIA national championship as a sophomore. As a senior, Douglas was named Defensive Player of the Year by The Pigskin Club of Washington, D.C. He is also a member of Phi Beta Sigma fraternity.

== NFL career ==
Douglas was a first-round draft choice of the Jets in the 1995 NFL draft and was traded to the Eagles prior to the 1998 season for draft picks in the second and fifth round. The Jets would then send the second round pick to the Pittsburgh Steelers for three further picks, in the 2nd, 3rd, and 5th round. Those picks would become Dorian Boose, Kevin Williams, and Eric Bateman. The second Philadelphia pick would be used on Casey Dailey. None of the four would leave any sort of lasting mark in the NFL. Douglas spent the 2003 campaign with the Jaguars before re-signing with Philadelphia in 2004. Douglas is ranked sixth behind Reggie White (124), Trent Cole (85.5), Brandon Graham (76.5), Clyde Simmons (76), and Fletcher Cox (70) on the Eagles' all-time sack list with 54.5 during his six seasons.

Douglas was cut by the Eagles prior to the 2005 season, but was hired into the front office position of "Good-Will Ambassador" shortly after.

On November 5, 2005, Douglas was reportedly involved in an altercation with former Eagles teammate Terrell Owens, who was in the midst of a very public war of words with the team. Owens was suspended by the team and was later deactivated when he refused to fully apologize for the altercation, as well as for derogatory remarks made about Eagles' quarterback Donovan McNabb.

== NFL career statistics ==
Legend
**Bold**	Career high

=== Regular season ===
Year	Team	Games		Tackles					Interceptions					Fumbles			
Year	Team	GP	GS	Cmb	Solo	Ast	Sck	TFL	Int	Yds	TD	Lng	PD	FF	FR	Yds	TD
1995	NYJ	15	3	33	25	8	10.0	-	0	0	0	0	-	0	2	0	0
1996	NYJ	10	10	36	28	8	8.0	-	0	0	0	0	-	2	**3**	**64**	**1**
1997	NYJ	15	15	39	31	8	4.0	-	0	0	0	0	-	**3**	0	0	0
1998	PHI	15	13	46	37	9	12.5	-	0	0	0	0	-	2	0	0	0
1999	PHI	4	2	8	6	2	2.0	2	0	0	0	0	-	0	0	0	0
2000	PHI	**16**	15	**54**	44	**10**	**15.0**	**21**	**1**	**9**	0	**9**	**2**	2	0	0	0
2001	PHI	15	15	47	39	8	9.5	11	0	0	0	0	**2**	2	0	0	0
2002	PHI	**16**	**16**	53	**45**	8	12.5	20	0	0	0	0	**2**	0	0	0	0
2003	JAX	**16**	**16**	27	22	5	3.5	5	0	0	0	0	**2**	2	0	0	0
2004	PHI	**16**	3	15	15	0	3.0	5	0	0	0	0	1	0	0	0	0
		138	108	358	292	66	80.0	64	1	9	0	9	9	13	5	64	1

=== Playoffs ===
Year	Team	Games		Tackles					Interceptions					Fumbles			
Year	Team	GP	GS	Cmb	Solo	Ast	Sck	TFL	Int	Yds	TD	Lng	PD	FF	FR	Yds	TD
2000	PHI	2	2	5	4	**1**	**2.0**	**2**	0	0	0	0	-	1	0	0	0
2001	PHI	**3**	**3**	**8**	**7**	**1**	**2.0**	**2**	0	0	0	0	-	0	0	0	0
2002	PHI	2	2	2	2	0	0.0	0	0	0	0	0	**1**	0	0	0	0
2004	PHI	**3**	0	0	0	0	0.0	0	0	0	0	0	0	0	0	0	0
		10	7	15	13	2	4.0	4	0	0	0	0	1	1	0	0	0

== Broadcasting career ==
Douglas was employed for a while as an on-air reporter with WTXF-TV in Philadelphia and in 2005 joined 610 WIP a regular personality on Philadelphia's sports radio station.

In January 2011, Douglas was named co-host of a Six Nations Championship rugby show on BBC America following a successful guest appearance. In his taped segments, Douglas took a stab at the sport, interviewed zookeepers and took an Irish stepdancing lesson.

On August 1, 2011 ESPN announced that Douglas would join the network as an NFL studio analyst. He provided analysis across a myriad of studio programs such as SportsCenter, NFL Live, First Take and ESPNews.

In September 2012, Douglas joined Jalen Rose as a full-time analyst on ESPN2's Numbers Never Lie, but was fired on August 13, 2013, after reportedly calling colleague Michael Smith an "Uncle Tom".

Douglas worked for 92.9 The Game sports talk radio station in Atlanta, GA from 2015 until 2023.

On February 20, 2023, Douglas returned to Philadelphia to co-host the Midday Show with Joe Giglio on 94.1 WIP.
