= Charissa Thompson =

American television host and sportscaster

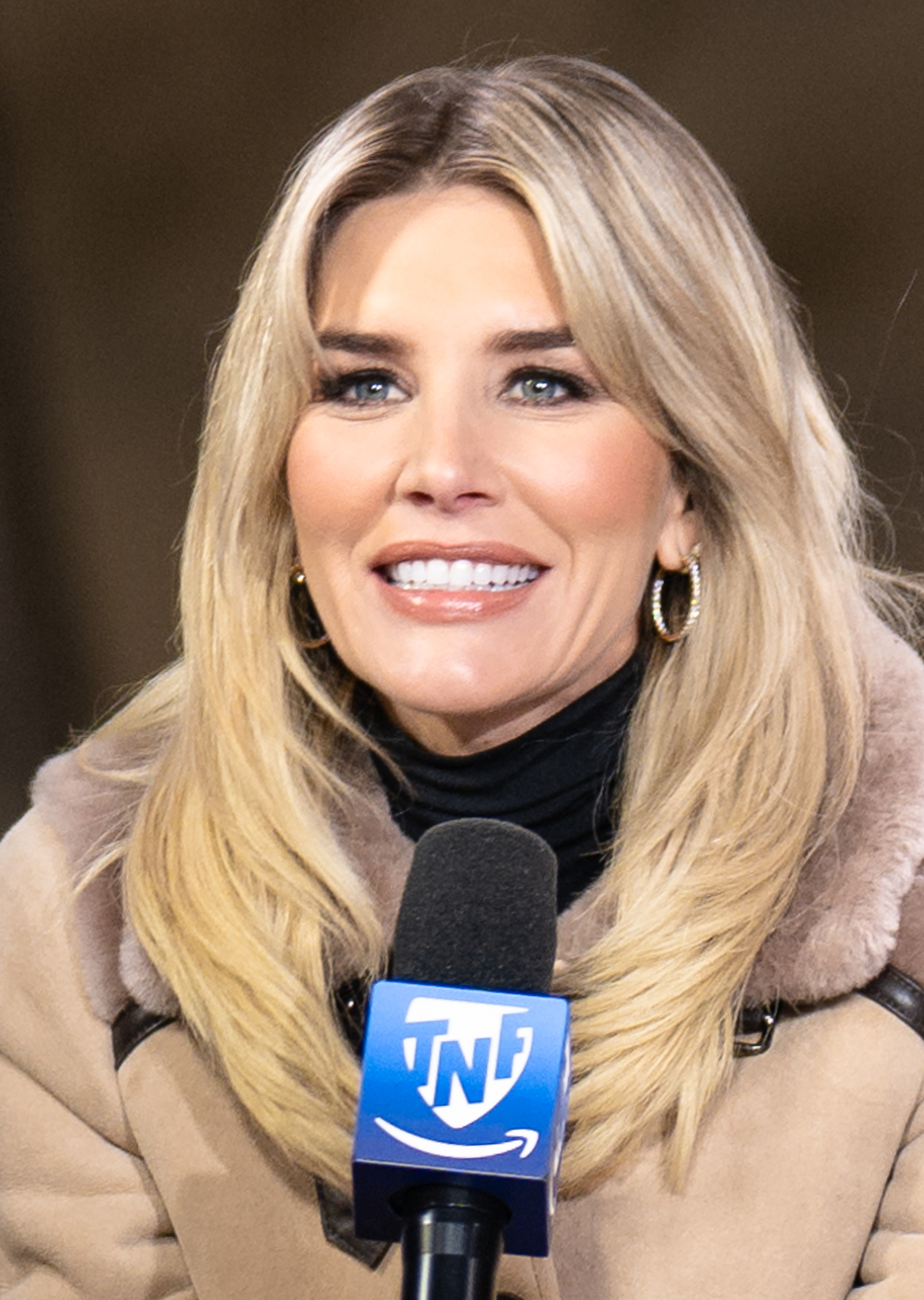
- Thompson in 2023
- Born: Charissa Jean Thompson; May 4, 1982 (age 44); Seattle, Washington, U.S.
- Education: University of California, Santa Barbara (B.A.)
- Occupations: Television host and sportscaster
- Years active: 2006–present
- Television: NHL on Versus, Big Ten Network, Extra, Fox NFL Kickoff, NFL on Fox, Fox Sports 1 (sideline reporter); Numbers Never Lie on ESPN (host); SportsNation on ESPN (co-host) NFL Gameday Prime Host (NFL Network)
- Spouse: Kyle Thousand (m. 2020; div. 2022)
- Website: charissathompson.com

Charissa Jean Thompson (born May 4, 1982) is an American television host and sportscaster working for Fox Sports and Amazon Prime Video. Previously, Thompson worked for ESPN, Versus, GSN and the Big Ten Network. She was the co-host of SportsNation along with Marcellus Wiley until leaving ESPN for Fox Sports in June 2013. She became the host of Fox Sports Live on the new Fox Sports 1 network when it debuted on August 17, 2013. She also was one of the American hosts of Ultimate Beastmaster. From 2014 to 2017, Thompson was a co-host on the syndicated entertainment news show Extra.

== Early life and education ==
Thompson was born and raised in Seattle, Washington. The youngest of three children, she knew she wanted to be a broadcaster from an early age. She attended Inglemoor High School in Kenmore, Washington. Thompson moved to California to attend community college and gain California residency. She later transferred to the University of California, Santa Barbara where she graduated with a B.A. in Law and Society in 2004. While Sports Illustrated wrote "she left Washington State (WSU) to attend community college in California before transferring to UC Santa Barbara," Thompson has clarified she did not attend WSU.

== Career ==
=== Big Ten Network and Fox Sports Net (2007–2010) ===
Early in her career, Thompson appeared on various college sports shows on Big Ten Network and Fox Sports Net (FSN). Thompson additionally served as a sideline reporter for college football and college basketball games on the two networks. She continued these roles as she progressed in her sports media and journalism career, as she became a National Football League (NFL) sideline reporter for NFL on Fox.

For Big Ten Network, Thompson appeared on various Big Ten Network shows, such as Big Ten's Best and Friday Night Tailgate.

For FSN, she appeared on baseball programs, including The 2007 MLB All-Star Game Red Carpet Parade and The Baseball Report both on Fox Sports Net (FSN). She also appeared on FSN's BCS Breakdown and The BCS Show. Thompson co-hosted FSN's The Best Damn Sports Show Period alongside Chris Rose and John Salley until 2009, due to the show's cancellation. She also hosted FSN's rodeo show Toughest Cowboy.

Thompson completed her first run as an NFL sideline reporter in fall 2008. During the season, Thompson dyed her hair black to "rid [herself] of the Barbie thing," as she is notably blonde. Her change of hair color drew attention from some sports blogs; Deadspin ran an article titled: "Charissa Thompson Continues Down Suicidal Path to Frumpyville". Thompson soon switched her hair color back to blonde.

Thompson also appeared outside the Big Ten Network and FSN early in her career. She was on the cover of the April 2009 issue of Access DirecTV (satellite TV provider DirecTV's monthly TV Guide-like magazine) and interviewed Philadelphia Phillies pitcher Cole Hamels for the feature story. Also in 2009, she co-hosted Big Saturday Night on Game Show Network (GSN), and appeared on Shaq Vs. as a sideline reporter. In fall 2009, she served as a reporter for NHL on Versus.

=== Continued career growth and ESPN years (2010–2013) ===
In 2010, Thompson appeared on the NFL Network's "NFL Now Updates". She covered the 2010 Vancouver Olympic Winter Games, reporting for Yahoo Sports. She became a co-host for the Speed Network's "Fast Track To Fame" alongside now retired NASCAR driver-owner turned Fox Sports analyst Michael Waltrip. In June and July 2010, Thompson covered the FIFA World Cup in South Africa for Yahoo! Sports. In January 2011, she covered the BCS National Championship game for Yahoo! Sports. A week later, she covered Super Bowl XLV in Dallas, Texas, for Yahoo! Sports, and then the NBA All-Star Game for Yahoo! Sports. On January 30, 2011, she covered the NHL All-Star Game for Versus. A month later, Versus dropped Thompson and Lindsay Soto from their ice-level reporting staff after the NBC–Comcast merger; they were replaced by Pierre McGuire, Brian Engblom, and Darren Pang, forming the Inside the Glass team.

In June 2011, Thompson joined ESPN. With Michael Smith, she co-hosted the show Numbers Never Lie, which debuted September 12, 2011. Thompson has also filled in as a host on SportsNation and First Take. In July 2012, she replaced Michelle Beadle as host of SportsNation after Beadle left for NBC. She left ESPN in June 2013 to return to Fox Sports.

In 2013, Thompson joined actor Joey Lawrence as a co-host of the ABC's reality TV series Splash, where star contestants dive from Olympic-style platforms and are scored on their performance by Olympic divers, David Boudia and Steve Foley as well as the voting TV audience.

=== Rejoining Fox Sports for FS1 launch (2013–present) ===
Thompson rejoined Fox Sports in 2013 for the launch of Fox Sports 1 (FS1); she began on FS1 as a host on Fox Sports Live. She also became a presenter for Fox NFL Kickoff. In 2018, she replaced Katie Nolan as the host of NFL Films Presents on FS1.

=== Thursday Night Football (2022–present) ===
Thompson hosts Thursday Night Football on Amazon Prime, the NFL's first package of games available only via streaming. She hosts pregame, halftime, and postgame coverage.

=== Fabricated quotes admission ===
In a November 2023 interview with Barstool Sports, Thompson admitted to fabricating aspects of her sideline reporting. "I’ve said this before, so I haven’t been fired for saying it, but I’ll say it again. I would make up the report sometimes," she said. She was criticized by other sideline reporters as well as the Society of Professional Journalists, which said, "SPJ’s ethics code addresses truth, harm, independence and accountability. She gets the trifecta for destroying three ethical tenets with her lying.”

On November 17, 2023, Thompson posted a statement on Instagram in an attempt to clarify her admission. Thompson apologized, stating that she "used the wrong words" and that the reports she fabricated were observations about the game that she did not believe anyone associated would correct her on. Thompson also stressed that she never attributed her fabricated reports to any player or coach.

=== Other broadcasting appearances ===
Thompson has also served various roles outside of sports broadcasting. In 2014, she joined Mario Lopez and Tracey Edmonds as a co-host on the syndicated television show Extra. She also appeared as the host of the "Barstool Spelling Bee" in May 2015. In 2016, it was announced that Thompson would be a host on the Netflix reality show Ultimate Beastmaster. Thompson also joined Top Rank's broadcasting team for the Manny Pacquiao vs. Jessie Vargas pay-per-view event.

Thompson appears in local television advertisements for her father's car dealership.

Since 2021, Thompson has co-hosted the podcast Calm Down with fellow sportscaster Erin Andrews.

== Personal life ==
Thompson resides in Malibu, California. In January 2020, she became engaged to sports agent Kyle Thousand. She and Thousand married on December 30, 2020. It was announced they had separated after a year and were divorcing in April 2022.

She had a previous marriage when she was 25. She also previously dated ESPN analyst and former Chicago Bulls player Jay Williams.

In January 2018, nude photos of Thompson were leaked online after her iCloud account was hacked. Shortly thereafter, Thompson sought legal action. That June, she spoke about the incident to The Athletic, stating, "When it comes to your physical being and intimate photos between you and your boyfriend and things that you sent to someone when you were in a long-distance relationship and in love, it is your private property. So it felt—the obvious—like such an invasion."
