= Thursday Night Football =

Branding for NFL games broadcast on Thursdays

- Current TNF logo, in use since 2022
- Genre: American football game telecasts
- Directed by: Derek Mobley
- Presented by: Commentators: Al Michaels (play-by-play); Kirk Herbstreit (color commentator); Reporters: Kaylee Hartung (sideline); Rules analyst: Terry McAulay; Studio: Charissa Thompson; Tony Gonzalez; Ryan Fitzpatrick; Andrew Whitworth; Richard Sherman; Marshawn Lynch; Sam Schwartzstein; James Palmer (insider); Taylor Rooks
- Theme music composer: Pinar Toprak
- Opening theme: "Let Em' Know" by Shaboozey
- Country of origin: United States
- Original language: English
- No. of seasons: 16 (on NFL Network); 10 (on Prime Video)
- No. of episodes: 17 per season (16 regular season, 1 preseason)

Production
- Executive producer: Fred Gaudelli
- Producer: Mark Teitelman
- Production locations: Various NFL stadiums
- Camera setup: Multi-camera
- Running time: 210 minutes or until game ends (inc. adverts)
- Production companies: National Football League; NBC Sports (2016–2017 and 2022–2025); Prime Video Originals (2017–present)

Original release
- Network: NFL Network
- Release: November 23, 2006 – December 25, 2021
- Network: CBS
- Release: September 11, 2014 – October 26, 2017
- Network: NBC
- Release: November 17, 2016 – December 25, 2017
- Network: Fox
- Release: September 27, 2018 – December 25, 2021
- Network: Prime Video
- Release: September 28, 2017 – present
- Network: Twitch
- Release: September 27, 2018 – present

Related
- NFL Network Exclusive Game Series

Thursday Night Football (commonly abbreviated as TNF) is the branding used for broadcasts of National Football League (NFL) games that broadcast primarily on Thursday nights. Most of the games kick off at 8:15 Eastern Time (8:20 prior to 2022 and 8:25 prior to 2018).

Debuting on November 23, 2006, the telecasts were originally part of NFL Network's Run to the Playoffs package, which consisted of eight total games broadcast on Thursday and Saturday nights (five on Thursdays, and three on Saturdays, originally branded as Saturday Night Football) during the later portion of the season. Since 2012, the TNF package has begun during the second week of the NFL season; the NFL Kickoff Game and the NFL on Thanksgiving are both broadcast as part of NBC Sports' Sunday Night Football contract and are not included in Thursday Night Football.

In 2014, the NFL shifted the package to a new model to increase its prominence. The entire TNF package would be produced by a separate rightsholder, who would hold rights to simulcast a portion of the package on their respective network. Networks have included CBS, NBC and Fox.

In 2016, the NFL also began to sub-license digital streaming rights to the broadcast television portion of the package to third-parties, beginning with Twitter in 2016, and Amazon in 2017—initially on Prime Video, and since 2018 it is also being carried freely on Amazon-owned live streaming platform Twitch.

In 2021, it was announced that Amazon had acquired the exclusive rights to Thursday Night Football beginning in the 2023 season under the NFL's new broadcasting deals, marking the first time that the NFL had sold one of its main television packages to a digital media company. As before, all of the games are also streamed for free on Twitch, and aired on local broadcast television stations in the markets of the opposing teams as per NFL rules. As with all other nationally televised games, they are also carried on radio as part of the NFL on Westwood One Sports package.

At the end of the 2025 season, Amazon announced an average of 15.3 million viewers had watched each game throughout the schedule, the highest on record.

== Background ==
=== Early history ===
The NFL Network's coverage was not the first time that NFL games were covered on Thursday or Saturday. ABC televised occasional Thursday night games from 1978 to 1986 as part of its Monday Night Football package. Prior to the new contract, ESPN carried a handful of sporadic Thursday night games (usually those displaced from Sunday night) and the broadcast networks used to air several national games on Saturday afternoons in mid-to-late December after the college football regular season ended. Incidentally, the only reason the league is even allowed to televise football games on Saturday night stems from a legal loophole: the league's antitrust exemption, the Sports Broadcasting Act of 1961, was written when the NFL regular season ended in mid-December, and as such, it contains specific language that prohibits televising NFL games in most markets on Friday nights and all day on Saturdays between the second week of September and the second week of December, to protect high school and college football. Since most high school and college seasons have ended by mid-December, other than bowl games, there has been little desire to close this loophole, even though the regular season has expanded well beyond mid-December since the law's passage.

In 2005, when the NFL negotiated a new set of television contracts, Comcast-owned OLN offered to pay $450 million for an eight-year contract to carry NFL prime time games. In exchange, Comcast planned to add NFL Network to its digital cable lineup. The channel was added, but NFL Network decided to air the games itself, foregoing a rights fee. The other television deals generated $3.735 billion per year over an eight-year period for CBS, Fox, NBC, ESPN and DirecTV (owner of the out-of-market sports package NFL Sunday Ticket).

As previously mentioned, Thursday Night Football debuted on November 23, 2006, with the Kansas City Chiefs handing the visiting Denver Broncos a 19–10 Thanksgiving defeat. Each of the game broadcasts were titled either Thursday Night Football or Saturday Night Football, depending on the night on which it aired. This format carried over to the 2007 season.

At its launch, the package proved highly controversial mainly due to the relative unavailability of NFL Network at the time; the league used the games as leverage to encourage television providers to carry NFL Network on their basic service tiers, rather than in premium, sports-oriented packages that required subscribers to pay a higher fee; although, as with all other national cable telecasts of NFL games, the league's own regulations require the games to be syndicated to over-the-air television stations in the local markets of the teams. These issues were magnified in 2007, when a game between the New England Patriots and New York Giants that saw the Patriots defeat the Giants to close out a perfect regular season was simulcast nationally on both CBS and NBC, in addition to NFL Network and the local stations that the game was sold to, following concerns from politicians and other critics.

Starting in 2008, NFL Network eliminated all but one of the Saturday night games and started their Thursday night package three weeks earlier. This was done to accommodate the earlier schedule and the league's antitrust exemption that prohibits Saturday games from being held for most of the season. In the following season, all references to Saturday Night Football were dropped, and any games that are not played on Thursday (such as in 2016, two Christmas weekend games and an NFL International Series game) have since been branded as "special editions" of Thursday Night Football, and later Thursday Night Special or NFL Network Special.

As part of new media contracts taking effect in the 2012 season, the Thanksgiving primetime game was moved from NFL Network to NBC's Sunday Night Football package.

During Super Bowl week in 2012, it was announced that the Thursday Night Football package would expand from eight to 13 games and air on NFL Network, again soliciting and rejecting offers from Turner Sports and Comcast. For the four seasons from 2012 to 2016, and again in 2020 and 2021 all 32 teams played a Thursday game following a Sunday game that guarantees each team a nationally televised game with 26 of them playing on Thursday Night Football and the other six playing on Thanksgiving. In addition, matchups are created with the intent to minimize travel in the leadup to the Thursday game. In general, the road team will play a home game the Sunday prior, while the home team will either play at home or a road game against a nearby opponent the Sunday before hosting the Thursday game. However, there will be instances where the road team comes in having played a road game the Sunday prior in a nearby city that makes it possible for teams from far away to play each other on Thursday, as well as consolidate long road trips for the road team.

For the 2012 season, a Spanish-language broadcast was added as second audio program.

=== 2014–2015: Partnership with CBS Sports ===
In January 2014, it was reported that the NFL was planning to sub-license a package of up to eight Thursday Night Football games to another broadcaster for the 2014 season. The NFL had negotiated with its existing broadcast partners, along with Turner Sports. These eight games were to be simulcast by NFL Network, and reports indicated that ESPN planned to place the games on ABC in the event it won the rights, bringing the NFL back to ABC for the first time since Super Bowl XL and the move of Monday Night Football to ESPN in 2006. The remaining games would remain exclusive to NFL Network, in order to satisfy carriage agreements with television providers guaranteeing a minimum number of games to air exclusively on the channel. The decision came as the league wished to heighten the profile of its Thursday night games, which had suffered from relatively lower viewership and advertising revenue in comparison to other games.

On February 5, 2014, the NFL announced that CBS had acquired the partial rights to TNF for the 2014 season. Under the agreement, all of the Thursday Night Football telecasts would be produced by CBS Sports and called by CBS's primary announcing team of Jim Nantz and Phil Simms. The first eight games of the season were simulcast nationally on NFL Network and CBS; the remaining games in the package only aired nationally on NFL Network, but per league broadcast policies, were simulcast on local stations in the participating teams' markets. CBS affiliates were given right of first refusal to air the local simulcast before it is offered to another station (as had occurred in Cincinnati, Ohio where the market's NBC affiliate WLWT aired a game between the Cincinnati Bengals and the Cleveland Browns instead of CBS affiliate WKRC-TV). A Saturday doubleheader was also added on Week 16: NFL Network aired the early game, while CBS aired the second, prime time game.

The NFL considered CBS's bid to be the most attractive, owing to CBS's overall ratings stature (CBS had been the highest-rated broadcast network in the United States since the 2005-06 television season), a commitment to aggressively promote the Thursday games across its properties, and its plans to utilize CBS Sports' top NFL talent and production staff across all of the games in the package to ensure a major improvement in quality over the previous, in-house productions. CBS staff also cited experience with its joint coverage of the NCAA Men's basketball tournament with Turner Sports as an advantage in its collaboration with NFL Network staff, as talent from both networks collaborate on pre-game, halftime and post-game coverage. During the games, a distinct graphics package co-branded with both CBS and NFL Network logos was used, certain players on each team wore microphones, and 4K cameras were used to allow zoom-in shots during instant replays.

With the move of selected games to CBS, media executives expected more major match-ups to appear on Thursday Night Football than in previous years in order to attract better viewership; in the past, Thursday Night Football had been criticized for often featuring games between lesser and poorer-performing teams. CBS and the NFL unveiled the games scheduled for Thursday Night Football in April 2014; CBS's slate of games featured a number of major divisional rivalries, including New York Giants–Washington, Green Bay–Minnesota, and its opening game on September 11, 2014, featuring the Pittsburgh Steelers and the Baltimore Ravens.

In the wake of the controversy surrounding Ravens player Ray Rice (who had been removed from the team and suspended from the NFL earlier in the week following the discovery of footage showing the player physically assaulting his wife, Janay, who was engaged to Rice at the time the security camera footage was recorded), changes were made to pre-game coverage on the first game in order to accommodate additional interviews and discussion related to the incident. Among these changes were the removal of an introductory segment featuring Rihanna (who was similarly assaulted by fellow performer Chris Brown in 2009) performing her song "Run This Town". Following complaints by Rihanna on Twitter regarding the removal, the song was pulled entirely from future broadcasts.

The rights were negotiated under a one-year contract valued at $275 million; on January 18, 2015, the NFL announced that it would renew the arrangement with CBS for the 2015 season, with its value increasing to around $300 million.

=== 2016–2017: CBS, NBC, and tri-cast with Twitter and Amazon Prime Video ===
In November 2015, The Hollywood Reporter reported that in response to the success of the package under CBS, the NFL was planning to negotiate a long-term contract for TNF, with CBS, Fox, NBC, and Turner Sports showing interest. The New York Post reported that this deal would also include the sale of a stake in NFL Network itself.

On December 16, 2015, it was reported that the NFL was shopping the TNF package as a one-year deal with an option for a second year, similarly to the current arrangement with CBS; the league also requested that bidders outline goals for "growing" NFL Network. The league was also reportedly interested in selling non-exclusive digital rights to simulcast the games to another partner, such as Amazon.com, Apple Inc., Google, or Yahoo! (which exclusively streamed an International Series as part of a trial during the 2015 season, but would shut down its original video content service in January 2016). In January 2016, it was reported that the NFL was considering splitting the TNF package across multiple broadcasters in tandem with the possibility of expanding the overall package to 17 games. It was also reported that ESPN and Turner Sports were not interested in the package due to its short-term nature, and that Fox was attempting to outbid CBS.

On February 1, 2016, the NFL announced that TNF would be shared between CBS, NBC, and NFL Network for the 2016 and 2017 seasons. CBS and NBC would each air five games (resulting in a schedule of ten games on broadcast television in comparison to eight under the previous deal), followed by an additional eight games exclusively on NFL Network to satisfy NFL Network's retransmission consent contracts with cable providers; the eight NFL Network-exclusive games included six Thursday contests, a Sunday morning International Series contest, and a Christmas Day game. As with the previous contract, all games will be simulcast by NFL Network. Commissioner Roger Goodell stated that the league was "thrilled to add NBC to the TNF mix, a trusted partner with a proven track record of success broadcasting NFL football in primetime, and look forward to expanding with a digital partner for what will be a unique tri-cast on broadcast, cable and digital platforms." On April 5, 2016, it was revealed that Twitter had acquired non-exclusive worldwide digital streaming rights to the ten broadcast television TNF games. The collaboration will also include streaming content on Twitter's Periscope service, such as behind the scenes access. This also gave NBC a rare distinction of holding two primetime NFL packages, with them already holding Sunday Night games.

Rogers Media, who owns television rights to the TNF package in Canada through the end of the 2016 season but has not yet acquired digital rights (the majority of the NFL's media rights in Canada are owned by Rogers's rival, Bell Media), successfully forced Twitter to block the game streams in that country, overriding the league's insistence that the free stream be global. Due to the streaming deal, over-the-top television providers PlayStation Vue and Sling TV are also required to black out the simulcast of the games on NFL Network.

The first game produced by NBC Sports was broadcast exclusively on NFL Network on November 3, 2016, while the first game simulcast nationally on NBC aired on November 17. A cappella group Pentatonix recorded a reworked version of their song "Sing" ("Weekend Go") to serve as the opening theme song for NBC's TNF telecasts; NBC also commissioned new instrumental theme music by Jimmy Greco, "Can't Hold Us Down", which was performed by members of the orchestra from the Broadway musical Hamilton. Both were retained for NBC's games in 2017.

On April 4, 2017, it was announced that Amazon.com had acquired non-exclusive streaming rights to the ten broadcast television games for the 2017 season over their Amazon Prime Video service, under a deal valued at $50 million, a five-fold increase over the $10 million paid by Twitter. The streams were exclusive to paid Prime subscribers. The deal includes $30 million worth of promotion. Amazon planned several special features for its inaugural game, including broadcasting alternate feeds with Spanish, Portuguese, and a secondary English broadcast featuring soccer commentators Ross Dyer and Tommy Smyth (intended for international viewers unfamiliar with the rules and terminology of American football), and a pre-show hosted by Tiki Barber and Curtis Stone that featured presentations of NFL merchandise available for purchase on Amazon.

The November 16, 2017 telecast between the Pittsburgh Steelers and Tennessee Titans was the first NFL broadcast to intentionally use the Skycam as its primary camera angle, as opposed to the usual sideline camera that has been used since telecasts of NFL games began in 1939. NBC Sports had previously switched to a skycam-only presentation for portions of two Sunday night games earlier that season because of fog and smoke (and, sixteen years prior, during its coverage of the XFL); positive reaction to the impromptu change prompted NBC to experiment with using the strategy for the full game. The Skycam Angle was also used for the December 14 telecast between the Denver Broncos and the Indianapolis Colts.

=== 2018–2021: Fox and Amazon Prime Video ===
In early January 2018, Bloomberg reported that ABC/ESPN and Fox Sports had both made bids for the next TNF package. Both Fox and Fox Sports 1 were named as potential outlets for the package in the Fox Sports bid, which was intended to showcase Fox's continued commitment to sports after the sale of its entertainment businesses to ESPN's majority-owner The Walt Disney Company (which excluded the Fox network itself and Fox Sports' national operations, such as FS1, among other assets). CBS and NBC were also considering renewing their existing contracts, but had requested a lower rights fee to compensate for the decreasing viewership of the NFL (TNF had been cited as one factor in the downturn, due to a perceived oversaturation of nationally televised games). It was also reported that the NFL would also allow digital companies to make bids for exclusive rights to the TNF package which forego a television partner entirely, unlike the previous non-exclusive deals with Twitter and Amazon.

On January 30, 2018, it was reported by multiple sources that Fox had won the package. The next day, the NFL officially announced that Fox had acquired the broadcast television rights to the TNF package under a five-year deal lasting from 2018 through 2022 (which is aligned with the conclusion of the NFL's other television deals). Fox would air eleven games per season in simulcast with NFL Network, and Fox Sports would produce all games within the package. ESPN reported that Fox would be paying around $60 million per game—an increase over the estimated $45 million per game paid by CBS and NBC under the previous contract, totaling an estimated $660 million per season. The Fox deal was terminated a season early in 2021.

Amazon renewed its digital rights for the 2018 and 2019 seasons; in contrast to 2017 in which the games required an Amazon Prime subscription, for 2018 and 2019, Amazon also carries game coverage for free on its live streaming platform Twitch. Alongside the main Fox feed, British English, and Spanish options, the Amazon Prime streams offer an alternate commentary feed featuring ESPN anchor Hannah Storm and NFL Network chief correspondent Andrea Kremer—the first all-female commentary team in NFL history. The Twitch streams offer access to the service's standard chat room (along with special football-themed emotes), an interactive extension, and co-streams featuring prominent personalities, while streams on Amazon Fire devices offer integration with the X-Ray feature to access statistics and other content.

Fox employed 45 cameras, a dual-skycam setup, triple-lens pylon cameras, and Intel True View replay systems where available. Fox NFL Thursday originated from Fox News Channel's Studio F in New York City, as well as an outdoor plaza setup on Sixth Avenue (Fox Square) with a scaled football field and an audience. A new graphics package was produced by Drive Studio, inspired by Times Square to reflect its New York City-based studio programming; unlike CBS and NBC, Fox utilized the same in-game presentation it uses for all other NFL games broadcast by the network.

For 2019, Fox announced that it would produce all of its games in 1080p upscaled to 4K, with hybrid log–gamma (HLG) high-dynamic-range color, beginning with its season premiere September 26, 2019. The telecasts were distributed via the Fox Sports app, Prime Video, and to participating television providers. HDR was only supported through television providers, but Fox stated that HDR and surround sound support would be enabled via streaming "soon".

Due a carriage dispute between Dish Network and Fox resulting in the removal of its owned-and-operated stations and cable networks, it was reported that Fox had pushed NFL Network to black out its simulcast of the October 3, 2019 game between the Los Angeles Rams and the Seattle Seahawks for Dish Network subscribers to prevent circumvention. However, due to a clause in Dish's carriage agreement that forbade the channel from performing provider-specific programming substitutions, NFL Network agreed to forego the simulcast entirely, and the game was made exclusive to Fox (making it the first TNF game to not air in some capacity on NFL Network). Fox and Dish agreed to a multi-year carriage agreement on October 6, 2019.

On April 29, 2020, Amazon renewed its digital rights through the 2022 season, maintaining the TNF simulcasts and digital content, and also adding exclusive international rights to one late-season game per-season outside of the package (which will be produced by CBS). For its simulcasts, Amazon replaced the British feed with a new "Scout's Feed" with extended analysis by Bucky Brooks and Daniel Jeremiah (akin to the ESPN "film room" broadcasts of college football games), and "NFL Next Live" on Twitch (with viewer interactivity).

On October 19, because of a COVID-19 outbreak involving the Tennessee Titans, the originally scheduled Thursday Night game between the Kansas City Chiefs and the Buffalo Bills, was moved to the following Monday due to the Titans playing the Bills the previous Tuesday. The Chiefs won 26–17. In a similar move, the Baltimore Ravens had their scheduled Week 13 TNF game against the Dallas Cowboys postponed to the following Tuesday. The Ravens had dealt with their own outbreak, which included positive tests from players including reigning MVP Lamar Jackson. For that reason, the Ravens had to postpone their Thanksgiving game against the Pittsburgh Steelers three times, the first time was originally postponed to the Sunday after Thanksgiving in the afternoon, then postponed a second time to the following Tuesday night, then postponed again to the following Wednesday in the afternoon. The postponements forced the Steelers' Week 13 game against the Washington Football Team to be moved from Sunday, December 6, to Monday, December 7, and as mentioned, the Cowboys-Ravens game a day later, with both games remaining on NFL Network, Fox, and Prime Video.

=== 2022–2033: Amazon Prime Video ===
In March 2021, Amazon acquired exclusive rights to TNF as part of the next round of NFL broadcasting agreements from 2023 through 2033. NFL Network, Fox, and Amazon subsequently opted out of the final year of the current agreement, meaning that Amazon's rights would begin in the 2022 NFL season instead. Also in that time, reports have verified that Amazon was close to partnering with NBC Sports to produce their broadcasts, and their contract is likely to be a three-year deal with Amazon having the option to extend it to five.

This partnership became materialized as along with lead play-by-play announcer Al Michaels, Sunday Night Football producer Fred Gaudelli moved to Amazon as part of collaboration from NBC Sports; Gaudelli explained that his production operated under a notion that they needed to produce a "great" broadcast before they could start "breaking things and being different", as NFL viewers had specific expectations as to how a game should be broadcast. Jared Stacy, Amazon's head of global live sports production, stated that they were "challenged by our leadership to figure out what’s next and to take some swings". Gaudelli went as far as suggesting that the on-field down and distance graphic use Amazon's "smile" symbol as an arrow. Amazon will employ 13 "super slo-mo" cameras, two Skycams, and TrackMan ball tracking. Pinar Toprak composed new theme music for the telecasts. Features from the previous simulcasts of TNF on Amazon platforms will return, including X-Ray, and broadcasts on Twitch. Amazon also plans alternate broadcasts for Prime Video and Twitch, such as one that features the sports comedy team Dude Perfect.

It was reported that Amazon was seeking advertising rates 20% higher than those of Thursday games in past seasons. Per a corporate policy prohibiting advertising that "encourage, glamorize or depict excessive consumption of alcohol" on its platforms, Amazon is not allowing commercials for alcoholic beverages to air during its telecasts (although they may still appear in advertising slots sold by the league, naturally as part of the stadium's advertising, or as part of commercial time held by local broadcasters).

As with all other NFL telecasts not on national broadcast television, all Thursday Night Football games are required to be simulcast on a broadcast television station in the home market of each participating team. To ensure availability of the broadcasts at commercial establishments such as bars and restaurants (which might not be configured to handle streaming-only broadcasts), Amazon partnered with DirecTV (which had historically carried NFL Sunday Ticket) to carry its Thursday Night Football telecasts on special channels for its business customers. In addition, Amazon reached an agreement with Nielsen Media Research to provide audience measurement under a three-year deal, allowing the games' viewership on Prime Video, Twitch, out-of-home, and on local broadcast stations to be tabulated in the Nielsen ratings.

Amazon carried a preseason game on August 25, 2022, featuring the San Francisco 49ers at the Houston Texans. The first regular season game on September 15, 2022 featured the Los Angeles Chargers at the Kansas City Chiefs. Nielsen reported an average of 13 million viewers across all measured platforms, which were in line with the average numbers that were garnered by Fox's Thursday Night Football broadcasts in the 2021 season, and an increase of five million over that year's season opener (which was an NFL Network-exclusive game).

On October 18, 2022, the NFL announced that Thursday Night Football would add a Friday afternoon game on the Friday after Thanksgiving beginning in 2023; Thursday Night Football had taken Thanksgiving week off since. The game will compete directly with the long-standing slate of college football games held on the Friday after Thanksgiving. Thursday Night Football had gone on hiatus during Thanksgiving week since 2012, as the Thanksgiving primetime game had been reassigned to the Sunday Night Football package. As an e-commerce company, the game is expected to leverage a captive audience of holiday shoppers for "Black Friday" as a potential audience, including the potential for advertising retail products and "Cyber Monday" promotions. The strategy is comparable to Prime Video's acquisition of Premier League soccer fixtures in early-December in the United Kingdom, which similarly leverages holiday shopping activity.

On March 28, 2023, following an underwhelming slate of games for the 2022 season that led to a 46% drop in viewership, significant changes were made in response to Amazon's demands for more compelling games. Starting in the 2023 season, teams are not required to have a Thursday game following a Sunday, while teams can play up to two Thursday games following a Sunday game per season. The league also approved the option of flexing Sunday games into Thursday despite overwhelming opposition from players and coaches. Up to two games from weeks 13 through 17 can be flexed with 28 days advanced notice, up from 15 days that was originally proposed. Since 2025, the flex timetable for TNF games was reduced to 21 days before kickoff. Additionally, only games between teams that have not played two Thursday games are eligible to be flexed and the same team can’t be flexed both times. In Week 16 was the first game flexed in TNF history for a rivalry game between the Browns–Bengals replace in favor of Broncos–Chargers game. In 2025, with Christmas Day falling on a Thursday, Prime Video aired their traditional game on Christmas night following a Netflix afternoon doubleheader. Likewise, in 2026, with Christmas Day falling on a Friday, Prime Video will air their traditional game on Christmas Eve.

In early 2026, Amazon announced record high viewership for its schedule in the 2025 regular season. Games averaged 15.3 million viewers per game, from a total of 122 million total unique viewers. In July 2026, it was reported that NBC would no longer provide production resources for Thursday Night Football beginning in the 2026 season, as Amazon had sufficiently expanded its in-house sports production capabilities, and NBC Sports had announced a partnership with YouTube focused on sports and its Peacock streaming service.

== Coverage ==
=== Game announcers ===
The initial NFL Network team consisted of HBO Sports' Bryant Gumbel as play-by-play announcer, NBC Sports' Cris Collinsworth as the color commentator for the Thursday telecasts, and Dick Vermeil replacing Collinsworth for Saturday telecasts. In 2007, Collinsworth replaced Vermeil alongside Gumbel for all games.

Gumbel left the network after the 2007 season and his then-HBO colleague Bob Papa, who is also the radio voice of the New York Giants, was brought in to replace him. Collinsworth stayed on until the end of the 2008 season, then left to take over for the retiring John Madden as lead analyst on NBC Sunday Night Football. NFL Network replaced him with Matt Millen, who returned to broadcasting in 2009, and then added former ESPN analyst Joe Theismann for 2010.

For 2011, then ESPN and now CBS play-by-play man Brad Nessler took over the Thursday night broadcast. He was joined by NFL Network draft analyst and NBC Notre Dame color man Mike Mayock, and the pairing spent three seasons calling games.

As a result of CBS taking over production responsibilities for the TNF broadcasts, its lead broadcast team of Jim Nantz and Phil Simms took over the broadcast booth. With NBC adding games in 2016, Al Michaels and Cris Collinsworth, the broadcast team of NBC Sunday Night Football, were required under league contract to do the same. NBC had initially hired former Monday Night Football play-by-play man Mike Tirico for Thursdays before the league nixed the idea of any separate broadcast teams for Sunday and Thursday nights. As a result, Tirico called two NBC-produced Thursday Night Special game broadcasts on December 18 and Christmas Day, respectively, both alongside former USFL and NFL quarterback Doug Flutie, who serves as the color commentator for NBC's college football coverage as well to fill-in for Al and Cris. Subsequently, Tirico eventually called three Sunday Night Football games, including the Thanksgiving night game which is in the SNF package, in order for NBC to allow Michaels over a week's rest before the end of the season and also the December 22, 2016 TNF game alongside Collinsworth. On May 31, 2017, it was announced that Tirico would replace Michaels full-time for NBC's Thursday Night Football games. For 2017, Kurt Warner similarly filled in for Collinsworth on two non-Thursday games.

For 2017, CBS hired Tony Romo as its lead color commentator. Numerous complications needed to be resolved, namely Romo's reluctance to cover both Sunday and Thursday nights as required under the Thursday Night Football contract, and the fact that Simms remains under contract with CBS through the next several years. However, the network confirmed via press release that Romo's duties would include Sunday and Thursday games and Simms joined The NFL Today studio team.

With TNF moving to Fox in 2018, the network announced that its top team of Joe Buck and Troy Aikman would call the games, after months of speculation that five-time NFL MVP Peyton Manning would be hired by the network to call their Thursday games. They were joined by Erin Andrews, who normally works with Buck and Aikman on Sundays alongside Kristina Pink and Mike Pereira, one of two rule analysts for Fox. In previous seasons prior to Fox's TNF contract, Buck did not call any NFL games during late October, working Major League Baseball playoff games instead. For 2018, none of Fox's scheduled MLB playoff broadcasts landed on a Thursday (Fox carried the NLCS and the World Series that year), so Buck continued to broadcast both sports, crisscrossing the country in seven cities over a 22-day period. The following year, the Chiefs–Broncos telecast fell on the same evening as Game 4 of the ALCS, requiring Buck to leave New York City for Denver and Joe Davis to fill in on baseball.

NFL Network has occasionally used non-Fox Sports broadcast teams for the games that air exclusively on that network. On October 14, 2018, the NFL announced via press release, that the NFL GameDay Morning studio team of Rich Eisen, Steve Mariucci, Kurt Warner, and Michael Irvin, would be calling the Eagles-Jaguars London Game on October 28. They were joined by Melissa Stark, who made her first appearance as a sideline reporter since ABC's coverage of Super Bowl XXXVII, and Peter Schrager, from Fox Sports, and NFL Network's Good Morning Football. The network kept the four-man booth for the 2019 London Games.

For 2018 and 2019, NFL Network borrowed Mike Tirico from former TNF holder NBC to serve as play-by-play for the network's Saturday games (Browns-Broncos and Ravens-Chargers in 2018, and Bills-Patriots in 2019), and reunited him with Warner on color commentary. Tirico and Warner were joined by Schrager on the sidelines. The early Saturday games in 2018 (Texans-Jets and Redskins-Titans) were announced by the trio of Curt Menefee, Steve Mariucci, and Nate Burleson, with Stark on the sideline. Menefee and Mariucci were both dropped from Saturday coverage in 2019, as they were replaced by Eisen and Joe Thomas for Texans-Buccaneers, the early game of the tripleheader in 2019, while Fox's B-Team of Kevin Burkhardt, Charles Davis, and Pam Oliver called Rams-49ers, the third game of the 2019 Saturday tripleheader.

Tirico had been scheduled to call Saturday games again in 2020, but after Al Michaels failed to clear NBC protocols for COVID-19, Tirico was dispatched to Sunday Night Football and Joe Davis worked the Saturday broadcasts with Warner. In 2021 NFL London Game was produced by CBS with Greg Gumbel and Adam Archuleta, Joe Davis and Kurt Warner paired up again Raiders vs. Browns in week 15 and Colts vs. Cardinals in week 16, Kevin Burkhardt and Greg Olsen worked Colts vs. Patriots in week 15 and the TNF game between the 49ers and Titans in week 16.

After unsuccessfully attempting to lure Aikman away from Fox for TNF full-time (with both Buck and Aikman ultimately leaving Fox for ESPN and Monday Night Football instead), Amazon hired Al Michaels and ESPN college football analyst Kirk Herbstreit as its lead broadcast team. In July 2022, Amazon then added former ESPN and ABC News reporter Kaylee Hartung as its sideline reporter. In January 2023, Hartung joined NBC News' The Today Show as a national correspondent.

=== Pregame coverage ===
Each game telecast on NFL Network was preceded by NFL GameDay Kickoff, which broadcast live from the site of each game and featured Colleen Wolfe as its host, with Joe Thomas, Michael Irvin, and Steve Smith Sr., or other NFL Network colleagues as analysts. The show generally begins two hours before game time (6:00 p.m. ET). NFL Network later introduced a second studio show earlier in the afternoon, TNF First Look, hosted by Andrew Siciliano.

CBS games were preceded by Thursday Night Kickoff, hosted by James Brown, Bill Cowher, and Deion Sanders, and was simulcast on CBS and NFL Network. NBC games were preceded by Football Night in America (which was renamed in reference of the host city of the game, such as Football Night in Tampa), hosted by Liam McHugh, Tony Dungy, and Rodney Harrison, and were likewise simulcast on NBC and NFL Network. NFL Network’s pregame crew typically joined the NBC and CBS crews for pregame coverage. NBC, CBS, Twitter (in 2016) and Amazon (in 2017) would join NFL Network’s pregame coverage at 7:30 p.m. Eastern Time during its games. This resulted in some controversy among viewers and the producers of syndicated programming in the locally programmed timeslot before network primetime, where the pre-game affects programs such as Wheel of Fortune, Jeopardy! and Entertainment Tonight (all distributed by CBS's sister syndication division CBS Media Ventures), along with several other programs, which then require pre-emption or slotting on lower-profile alternate timeslots or stations to air in markets where they are carried by CBS, Fox, or NBC affiliates in order to accommodate the Thursday games.

For Fox, game telecasts were preceded by Fox NFL Thursday. In 2018, it featured a fixed lineup hosted by Michael Strahan, with analysts Terry Bradshaw and Howie Long, and insider Jay Glazer. Unlike CBS and NBC, the NFL Network crew would not join Fox’s pregame coverage, as the latter’s pregame became the main pregame show for TNF. In 2019, Strahan remained host, but with Bradshaw and Long rotating as analyst, alongside fixed analyst Tony Gonzalez, and Peter Schrager, serving as insider. Fox also signed Rob Gronkowski to make appearances on the program. To accommodate Strahan's commitments to Good Morning America, the program was broadcast from New York City, with studio segments originating from Fox News Channel's studios rather than Fox Sports' Los Angeles studios. Due to the COVID-19 pandemic, the pre-game show moved to Los Angeles with Curt Menefee taking over as host. Strahan made remote appearances during the season due to his GMA commitments. Gonzalez left Fox prior to the 2021 season to pursue other film and television projects.

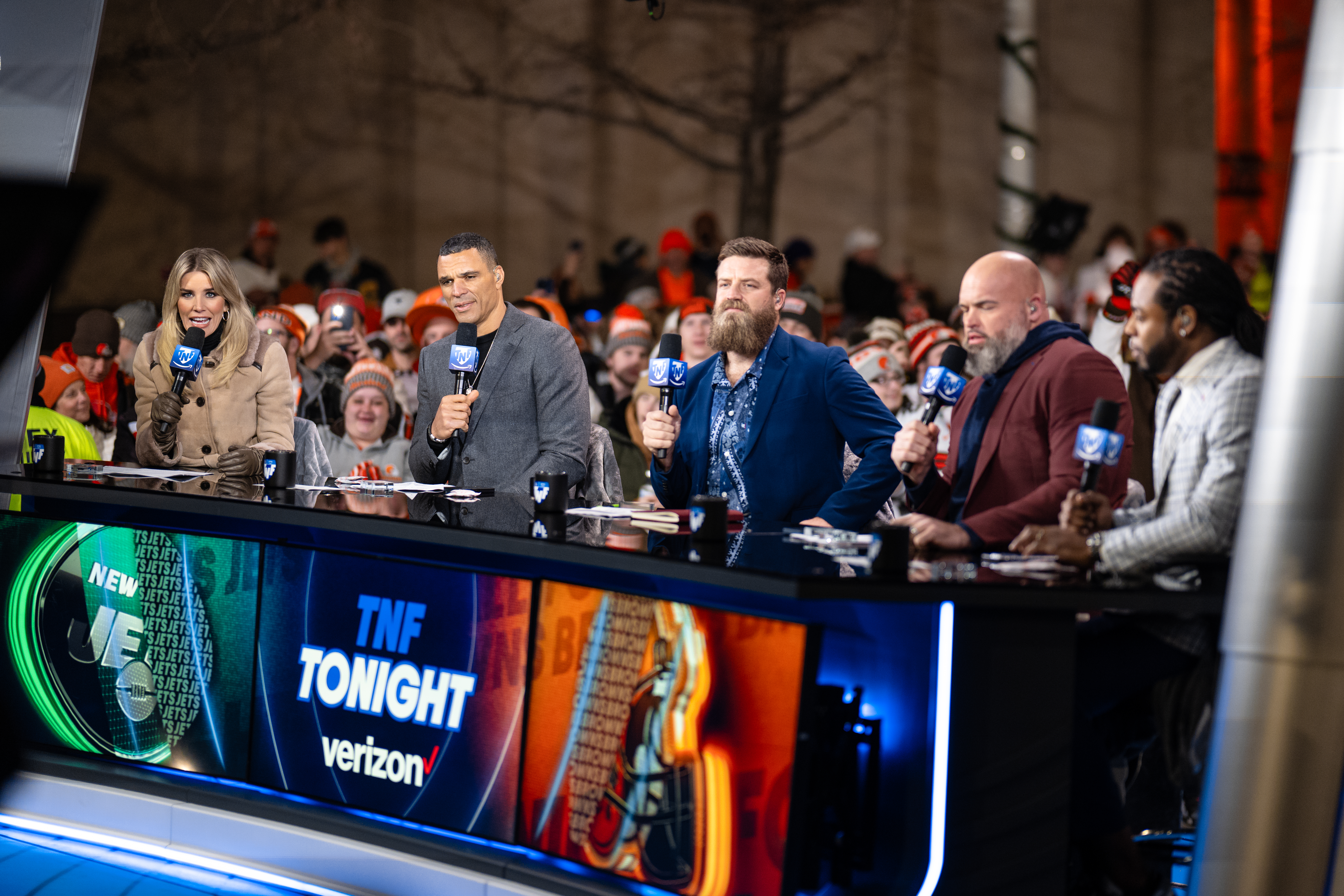
Prime Video's pregame crew in 2023

Amazon's games are preceded by TNF Tonight and Thursday Night Kickoff, which is hosted from the game site by Charissa Thompson, Tony Gonzalez, Ryan Fitzpatrick, Andrew Whitworth, and Richard Sherman, with contributions by Taylor Rooks and ESPN/NFL Network's Ian Rapoport. Marshawn Lynch also appears as part of a pre-recorded segment called "'N Yo' City", as does chef David Chang, who contributes to food-focused segments. Aqib Talib was also set to appear on the pregame show as well, but stepped down due to personal legal difficulties. Like CBS, NBC, and Fox, Prime Video's coverage is required to be picked up via over-the-air syndication in the markets of the teams that play each week, though only game coverage is carried on local stations with limited pre-game and post-game programming.

=== Radio coverage ===
As with all other national games, Westwood One provides radio broadcasts of Thursday Night Football games as part of its national radio package for the NFL. Ian Eagle handles play-by-play, with Tony Boselli handling color analysis.

== Game announcers ==
=== Current ===
==== Game coverage ====
- Al Michaels – play-by-play announcer (2022–present); NBC play-by-play (2016)
- Kirk Herbstreit – color commentator (2022–present)
- Kaylee Hartung – sideline reporter (2022–present)
- Terry McAulay – rules analyst (2022–present)

==== Alternate broadcasts ====
- Sam Schwartzstein – Prime Video Next Gen Stats analytics expert (2023–present)

==== Pregame coverage ====
- Charissa Thompson – pregame host (2022–present); Fox secondary host and contributor (2018-2021)
- Tony Gonzalez – pregame analyst (2022–present); Fox fill-in studio analyst (2018); full-time studio analyst (2019–2020)
- Ryan Fitzpatrick – pregame analyst (2022–present)
- Andrew Whitworth – pregame analyst (2022–present)
- Richard Sherman – pregame analyst (2022–present)
- Marshawn Lynch – contributor (2022–present)
- Taylor Rooks – contributor (2022–present)
- David Chang – contributor (2023–present)
- James Palmer – insider (2026–present)

==== Former ====
- Kay Adams – fill-in play-by-play (2021)
- Troy Aikman – Fox lead color commentator (2018–2021)
- Adam Amin – Fox fill-in play-by-play (2020)
- Erin Andrews – Fox sideline reporter (2018–2021)
- Adam Archuleta – London color commentator (2021)
- Dean Blandino – rules expert (2019–2021)
- Terry Bradshaw – Fox studio analyst (2018, 2020); rotating studio analyst (2019, 2021)
- Albert Breer – insider (2024)
- James Brown – CBS lead studio host (2014–2017)
- Joe Buck – Fox lead play-by-play (2018–2021)
- Kevin Burkhardt – Fox fill-in play-by-play (2019; 2021)
- Nate Burleson – fill-in color commentator (2018–2019)
- Reggie Bush – Fox fill-in studio analyst (2019)
- Maverick Carter – alternate broadcast announcer (2022–2023; select games)
- Andrew Catalon – Prime Video/Twitch Saturday play-by-play (2020)
- Fran Charles – NFLN studio host (2010)
- Cris Collinsworth – NFLN color commentator (2006–2008); NBC Color Commentator (2016–2017)
- Bob Costas – NBC studio host (2016)
- Bill Cowher – CBS studio analyst (2014–2017)
- Heather Cox – NBC sideline reporter (2016–2017)
- Lindsay Czarniak – Fox fill-in sideline reporter (2020)
- Charles Davis – Fox fill-in analyst (2019)
- Joe Davis – Fox fill-in play-by-play (2020–2021)
- Jenny Dell – CBS Fill-in sideline reporter (2014)
- Dude Perfect – alternate broadcast announcers (2022–2023; select games)
- Tony Dungy – NBC studio analyst and fill-in color commentator (2016–2017)
- Ross Dyer – UK Feed/Amazon Prime Video Fill-in Play-by-Play (2017)
- Ian Eagle – CBS Fill-in Play-by-Play (2014–2015) (Still calls TNF on the Radio)
- Rich Eisen – Lead studio host (2006-2017); fill-in play-by-play (2018–2019)
- Jamie Erdahl – CBS fill-in sideline reporter (2017)
- Marshall Faulk – Analyst (2006–2017 Week 14)
- Alex Flanagan – NFLN sideline reporter (2010–2013)
- Doug Flutie – NBC fill-in color commentator (2016)
- Jay Glazer – NFLN studio analyst (2010–2011); Fox insider (2018); contributor (2020–2021)
- Trent Green – CBS Fill-in Color Commentator (2015–2017)
- Bryant Gumbel – NFLN play-by-play (2006–2007)
- Greg Gumbel – CBS fill-in play-by-play (2017); London play-by-play (2021; deceased)
- Tom Hammond – NFLN substitute play-by-play (2007)
- Scott Hanson – NFLN sideline reporter (2009)
- Rodney Harrison – NBC studio analyst (2016–2017)
- Dan Hellie – Fill-in studio host (2017)
- Kara Henderson – NFLN studio host (2011)
- ’Cousin’ Sal Iacono – Fox prognosticator (2019–2021)
- Michael Irvin – studio analyst (2011–2021); fill-in color commentator (2018–2019)
- LeBron James – alternate broadcast announcer (2022–2023; select games)
- Jimmy Johnson – Fox contributor (2020)
- Harry Kalas – NFLN sponsorship announcer (2006–2008; deceased)
- Andrea Kremer – Prime Video alternate broadcast color commentator (2018-2022)
- Howie Long – Fox studio analyst (2018); rotating studio analyst (2019, 2021); contributor (2020)
- Steve Mariucci – studio analyst (2006–2019); fill-in color commentator (2018–2019)
- Mike Mayock – NFLN color commentator (2011–2013)
- Liam McHugh – Fill-in NBC studio host (2016); NBC studio host (2017)
- Curt Menefee – NFLN fill-in play-by-play (2018); Fox lead studio host (2020–2021)
- Matt Millen – NFLN color commentator (2009–2010)
- Jim Mora – NFLN studio analyst (2010)
- Jim Nantz – CBS lead play-by-Play (2014–2017)
- Brad Nessler – NFLN play-by-play (2011–2013)
- Pam Oliver – Fox fill-in sideline reporter (2019; 2021)
- Greg Olsen – Fox rotating studio analyst and fill-in color commentator (2021)
- Bob Papa – NFLN play-by-play (2008–2010)
- Dan Patrick – NBC Fill-in studio host (2017)
- Mike Pereira – Fox rules expert (2018–2021)
- Kristina Pink – Fox sideline reporter (2018–2021)
- Ian Rapoport – insider (2025)
- Tom Rinaldi – fill-in sideline reporter (2021)
- Paul Rivera – alternate broadcast announcer (2022–2023; select games)
- Tony Romo – CBS lead color commentator (2017)
- A.J. Ross – London sideline reporter (2021)
- Mark Sanchez – Fox rotating studio analyst (2021)
- Deion Sanders – NFLN/CBS studio analyst (2006–2017)
- Warren Sapp – NFLN studio analyst (2008)
- Adam Schefter – NFLN sideline reporter (2006–2008)
- Mark Schlereth – Fox fill-in color commentator (2020)
- Peter Schrager – fill-in sideline reporter (2018–2019; 2021); Fox insider (2019)
- Sterling Sharpe – NFLN studio analyst (2010–2011)
- Phil Simms – CBS lead color commentator (2014–2016)
- Michael Smith – insider (2022–2023)
- Steve Smith Sr. – studio analyst (2017–2021)
- Melissa Stark – fill-in sideline reporter (2018–2021)
- Hannah Storm – Prime Video alternate broadcast play-by-play (2018-2022)
- Michael Strahan – Fox lead studio host (2018–2019); contributor (2020–2021)
- Pat Summerall – NFLN sponsorship announcer (2009; deceased)
- Joe Theismann – NFLN color commentator (2010)
- Joe Thomas – studio analyst (2018–2021); fill-in studio analyst (2019)
- Amber Theoharis – Fill-in studio host (2016–2017)
- Mike Tirico – NBC fill-in studio host and play-by-play (2016); full-time play-by-play (2017); NFLN fill-in play-by-play (2018–2019)
- Dick Vermeil – NFLN Saturday color commentator (2006)
- Michael Vick – Fox fill-in studio analyst (2020)
- Kurt Warner – NFLN studio analyst (2010–2011); fill-in color commentator (2017–2021)
- Evan Washburn – CBS fill-in sideline reporter (2015)
- Colleen Wolfe – studio host (2018–2021)
- Tracy Wolfson – CBS lead sideline reporter (2014–2017)
- Steve Wyche – fill-in sideline reporter (2021)

=== Radio ===
==== Current ====
- Kevin Kugler – play-by-play (2025–present)
- Devin McCourty – color commentator (2024–present)
- Ross Tucker – color commentator (2024–present)

==== Former ====
- Bonnie Bernstein – sideline reporter (2006–2007)
- Tony Boselli – color commentator (2015–2023)
- Randy Cross – color commentator (2009)
- Ian Eagle – play-by-play (2008–2024)
- Dick Enberg – play-by-play (2006–2007)--deceased
- Dennis Green – color commentator (2007–2008)--deceased
- Mike Mayock – color commentator (2014)
- Tim Ryan – color commentator (2015) Select Games
- Sam Wyche – color commentator (2006)--deceased

== Results ==
This table shows the National Football League teams' all-time standings for games played on Thursday Night Football.

Standings are current as of Week 9 of the 2026 NFL season.

Team	Games Played	Wins	Losses	Ties	Win Pct.	First Appearance	Most Recent Appearance
Indianapolis Colts	16	12	4		.750	November 22, 2007 defeated Atlanta 31–13	October 6, 2022 defeated Denver 12–9 (OT)
Kansas City Chiefs	15	11	4		.733	November 23, 2006 defeated Denver 19–10	December 25, 2025 lost to Denver 20–13
Pittsburgh Steelers	18	10	8		.556	December 7, 2006 defeated Cleveland 27–7	October 1, 2026 lost to Cleveland 27–24
New York Jets	21	8	13		.381	November 13, 2008 defeated New England 34–31	November 13, 2025 lost to New England 27–14
Los Angeles Chargers**	16	9	7		.563	December 4, 2008 defeated Oakland 34–7	October 23, 2025 defeated Minnesota 37–10
Dallas Cowboys	20	13	7		.684	December 16, 2006 defeated Atlanta 38–28	October 8, 2026 lost to Tampa Bay 24–16
Philadelphia Eagles	15	9	6		.600	November 27, 2008 defeated Arizona 48–20	November 28, 2025 lost to Chicago Bears 24–15
New York Giants	13	5	8		.385	December 30, 2006 defeated Washington 34–28	October 9, 2025 defeated Philadelphia 34–17
San Francisco 49ers	22	13	9		.591	December 14, 2006 defeated Seattle 24–14	October 2, 2025 defeated L.A. Rams 26–23 (OT)
Denver Broncos	23	11	12		.455	November 23, 2006 lost to Kansas City 19–10	October 15, 2026 defeated to Seattle 17–14
Atlanta Falcons	17	12	5		.706	December 16, 2006 lost to Dallas 38–28	September 24, 2026 defeated Green Bay 35–14
Chicago Bears	18	10	8		.529	December 6, 2007 lost to Washington 24–16	October 22, 2026 defeated New England 30–24
Baltimore Ravens	19	13	6		.722	November 30, 2006 lost to Cincinnati 13–7	November 5, 2026 lost to Jacksonville 33–10
Seattle Seahawks	18	11	7		.647	December 14, 2006 lost to San Francisco 24–14	October 15, 2026 lost to Denver 17–14 (OT)
Green Bay Packers	18	12	6		.625	December 21, 2006 defeated Minnesota 9–7	October 29, 2026 defeated Carolina 27–19
Arizona Cardinals	16	5	11		.313	November 27, 2008 lost to Philadelphia 48–20	September 25, 2025 lost to Seattle 23–20
Washington Commanders****	12	5	7		.417	December 30, 2006 lost to N.Y. Giants 34–28	September 11, 2025 lost to Green Bay 27–18
New England Patriots	16	11	5		.733	December 29, 2007 defeated N.Y. Giants 38–35	October 22, 2026 lost to Chicago 30–24
Miami Dolphins	16	7	9		.438	November 19, 2009 defeated Carolina 24–17	October 30, 2025 lost to Baltimore 28–6
Detroit Lions	7	4	3		.571	December 3, 2015 lost to Green Bay 27–23	September 17, 2026 lost to Buffalo 41–31
Houston Texans	14	6	8		.429	December 13, 2007 defeated Denver 31–13	November 20, 2025 defeated Buffalo 23–19
Las Vegas Raiders***	17	8	9		.471	December 23, 2006 lost to Kansas City 20–9	November 6, 2025 lost to Denver 10–7
Cleveland Browns	17	10	7		.588	December 7, 2006 lost to Pittsburgh 27–7	October 1, 2026 defeated Pittsburgh 27–24
Cincinnati Bengals	14	6	8		.429	November 30, 2006 defeated Baltimore 13–7	October 16, 2025 defeated Pittsburgh 33–31
Carolina Panthers	18	6	12		.353	December 22, 2007 lost to Dallas 20–13	October 29, 2026 lost to Green Bay 27–19
Jacksonville Jaguars	17	7	10		.375	December 18, 2008 lost to Indianapolis 31–24	November 5, 2026 defeated Baltimore 33–10
Tennessee Titans	15	6	9		.400	December 25, 2009 lost to San Diego 42–17	November 2, 2023 lost to Pittsburgh 20–16
New Orleans Saints	13	4	9		.308	December 11, 2008 lost to Chicago 27–24	October 17, 2024 lost to Denver 33–10
Buffalo Bills	15	8	7		.533	December 3, 2009 lost to N.Y. Jets 19–13	September 17, 2026 defeated Detroit 41–31
Los Angeles Rams*	18	9	9		.500	December 20, 2007 lost to Pittsburgh 41–24	December 18, 2025 lost to Seattle 38–37 (OT)
Minnesota Vikings	11	3	8		.273	December 21, 2006 lost to Green Bay 9–7	October 23, 2024 lost to L.A. Chargers 37–10
Tampa Bay Buccaneers	18	5	13		.235	December 17, 2011 lost to Dallas 31–15	October 8, 2026 defeated Dallas 24–16

• *St. Louis Rams, 1995–2015

• **San Diego Chargers, 1961–2016

• ***Oakland Raiders, 1995–2019

• **** Washington Redskins, 1937–2019; Washington Football Team, 2020–2021

== Reception ==
=== Carriage ===
Upon the original launch of the Thursday and Saturday night games, few television service providers carried the NFL Network due to disputes during the network's terms in its carriage contracts during negotiations. These disputes were magnified throughout the 2007 season, as two high-profile matchups were to be broadcast by the network. The first was a matchup between the Dallas Cowboys and Green Bay Packers which was scheduled for the week after Thanksgiving and saw both teams at 10–1, vying for the top seed in the NFC, and the second was Week 17 Saturday night game between the New England Patriots and the New York Giants, where the Patriots had a chance to become the first team since the 1972 Miami Dolphins to end a regular season undefeated.

In the first case, fans were displeased that a matchup between two teams at such a critical point in the season was not available on broadcast television except in the Dallas and Green Bay markets. To avoid such a problem with the potential sixteenth victory for the Patriots, CBS and NBC bought broadcast rights to the game so it could be seen by a nationwide audience on both cable and broadcast television. This ended up causing another controversy, however, as the move by the networks infringed on the exclusivity that would normally have been enjoyed by WWOR-TV in New York City and WCVB-TV in Boston, which were the Giants' and Patriots' respective local over-the-air broadcasters for cable-televised games (the game aired on these stations, as well as on WCBS-TV, WNBC, WBZ-TV and WHDH in the teams' market areas).

=== Game quality and viewership ===
Thursday Night Football games on NFL Network are among the lowest-rated nationally televised NFL broadcasts. Critics have argued that the games televised on Thursday Night Football have been of lower quality than other prime time games, as they often featured match-ups between lesser or poor-performing teams, and that the shortened rest between games triggered by Thursday games also has an effect on their overall quality. In an analysis by Sports on Earth writer Aaron Roberts, it was determined that most Thursday games were of average or above-average quality in comparison to normal, non-prime time games, but that this was "by design" due to the leverage of other NFL broadcasters on how games are scheduled throughout the season (which traditionally prioritizes "major" games for either late-afternoon or Sunday and Monday nights).

The move of selected games to CBS brought improved ratings: the inaugural game was the highest-rated program of the night, with an audience share of 13.7 and an average of 20.7 million viewers, representing a 108% increase in ratings over the first NFL Network game in 2013. The game, whose ratings were boosted by coverage of the Ray Rice scandal, also brought CBS its highest prime time ratings on a Thursday night since May 2006. While lower, at 9.6 million viewers, the Week 3 game between the Atlanta Falcons and Tampa Bay Buccaneers was also the highest-rated program of the night. The first four games of the package, however, featured blowout victories. In total, average viewership of the games increased from around 7 million to around 11.8 million in the 2014 season.

Controversy over ratings and the quality of play in Thursday night contests escalated when on November 28, 2016, a report circulated that the league was considering ending the franchise. The NFL, however, denied this rumor. The subsequent game on December 1, 2016 between the Dallas Cowboys and the Minnesota Vikings was the highest rated Thursday Night Football of the season.

During the 2016 season, current and former players including Richard Sherman, J. J. Watt, and Charles Woodson expressed their dislikes for Thursday Night Football, with Richard Sherman calling it a "poopfest".

The September 20, 2018 game between the New York Jets and Cleveland Browns, which saw the debut of Cleveland's first overall pick Baker Mayfield, as well as the team breaking a nearly two-year losing streak, set a record for the highest-rated NFL Network-exclusive broadcast in Thursday Night Football history, with a 5.2 household rating and over 8 million viewers.

Criticism of Thursday night game quality intensified during and after the 2022 NFL season, the first season in which TNF games were broadcast exclusively by Amazon Prime. For example, an overwhelming number of NFL fans, commentators, and former players reacted negatively to an October 6, 2022 game in which the Indianapolis Colts and Denver Broncos punted 12 times, threw four combined interceptions, and scored zero combined touchdowns in over 60 minutes of gameplay. The criticism was even shared among those working to deliver the Thursday night games to a national audience. For example, after the conclusion of the 2022 regular season, Al Michaels, the full time play-by-play announcer for TNF, commented on his experience calling TNF games and said, “I mean, you just can’t oversell something. Do you want me to sell you a 20-year-old Mazda? That’s what you’re asking me to do. I can’t sell you a used car." In the same interview, Michaels even referenced the aforementioned Week 5 contest between Indianapolis and Denver as a primary example of a suboptimal game that he had to call and described the game as "dreadful." The following offseason, the NFL enabled flexible scheduling for Thursday night games, which the league had previously balked at.

=== Player safety ===
As mentioned, a team needing to play a Thursday night game can result in a shortened rest period for players between games. On October 6, 2014, Arian Foster, then of the Houston Texans, made a statement considering it hypocritical for the NFL to emphasize the safety of players (particularly in regards to concussions) while allowing its players to play a game on only three days' rest, which he considered to be equally "dangerous". Richard Sherman of the Seattle Seahawks has also voiced displeasure about Thursday night games reducing prep time, and wrote a 2016 editorial for The Players' Tribune about the games. Sherman's 2017 season (and his run with the Seahawks; he would sign a new deal with the San Francisco 49ers in the 2018 off-season) would end on November 9, 2017 during a Thursday night game against the Arizona Cardinals, when he ruptured his Achilles tendon. Sherman would later go on to become a pregame and postgame analyst for Amazon Prime's Thursday Night Football.

On January 29, 2015, the NFL released its health and safety report, which states that an average of 4.8 injuries were sustained during Thursday games compared to 6.9 injuries per game on Sundays and Mondays.

During their September 29, 2022 game against the Cincinnati Bengals, Miami Dolphins quarterback Tua Tagovailoa hit the ground with his left elbow, back and back of his helmet after taking a sack. Tagovailoa demonstrated a fencing response, and was stretchered off the field and transported to the University of Cincinnati Medical Center with head and neck injuries. He was discharged from the hospital later that night. The game took place only four days after the Dolphins' previous game against Buffalo, where Tagovailoa was briefly taken out of the game due to a head injury (initially reported by the team as a back injury), but returned to the game afterward. That decision prompted an investigation by the NFLPA as a possible violation of concussion protocol; the NFL stated there were indications that the concussion protocol had been followed in this case. The NFL faced scrutiny over its concussion policy following the game, with critics arguing that Tagovailoa should not have been cleared to play at all (especially with the shortened rest between the games and the multiple injuries); the league's chief medical officer Allen Sills stated that "we want to be thorough, and we want to be consistent and be fair to everyone involved and make sure that we have all the data on hand before we reach a final determination."

The injury also prompted discussions over how such situations should be handled during broadcasts, as Amazon faced criticism for airing multiple, graphic replays of the injury during the telecast, and limiting discussion of the event during the halftime show. The first injury was discussed during a segment of the pre-game show, and acknowledged by color commentator Kirk Herbstreit after the second injury. A more extensive discussion did occur during the post-game show, where reporter Michael Smith stated that "I think there’s room for both concern for Tua — and frustration and outrage." ESPN analyst Cris Canty argued that the lack of discussion at halftime was an example of the NFL "protecting its own interest", while NBC Sports ProFootballTalk analyst Michael David Smith felt it was hypocritical of Richard Sherman to have signed with Amazon to join the Thursday Night Football studio panel, despite his previous criticisms of the games over player safety.

== See also ==
- NFL on Fox
- NFL on CBS
- NFL on NBC
- NBC Sunday Night Football
- Monday Night Football

Records
Preceded by ESPN	NFL Thursday Night Football broadcaster 2006–present (with CBS from 2014 to 2017) (with NBC from 2016 to 2017) (with Fox from 2018 to 2021)	Succeeded by Amazon Prime Video
