= Cari & Jemele (Won't) Stick to Sports (talk show) =

Vice TV commentary show hosted by Jemele Hill and Cari Champion

- Genre: Sports activism commentary
- Presented by: Jemele Hill; Cari Champion
- Country of origin: United States
- Original language: English
- No. of seasons: 1
- No. of episodes: 18

Original release
- Network: Vice
- Release: August 19, 2020 – February 4, 2021

Cari and Jemele Won't Stick to Sports (stylized as Cari & Jemele (won't) Stick to Sports) is an American talk show hosted by Jemele Hill and Cari Champion. The show aired Vice TV from August 19, 2020 to February 4, 2021, for 18 episodes. In the show, Hill and Champion would discuss social issues, sports activism, business, and pop culture. The show's name was derived from the commonly used 'stick to sports' phrase in pushback against the argument that athletes and sports journalists should not publicly share their political beliefs.

The show hosted guests such as Magic Johnson, Mark Cuban, Steve Austin, Cory Booker, and LeBron James.
