= His & Hers (TV program) =

- Starring: Michael Smith; Jemele Hill
- Country of origin: United States

Production
- Production locations: Bristol, Connecticut
- Running time: 60 minutes

Original release
- Network: ESPN2
- Release: September 12, 2011 – January 6, 2017

His & Hers was a sports discussion show hosted by Michael Smith and Jemele Hill who have each appeared on Highly Questionable as a co host but not together; it was televised by ESPN2 as part of its weekday lineup of studio programs. Originally premiering as the statistics-oriented program Numbers Never Lie, the program soon dropped its focus on metrics and became a statistics-based sports discussion program, leading to its eventual re-branding in November 2014.

== History ==
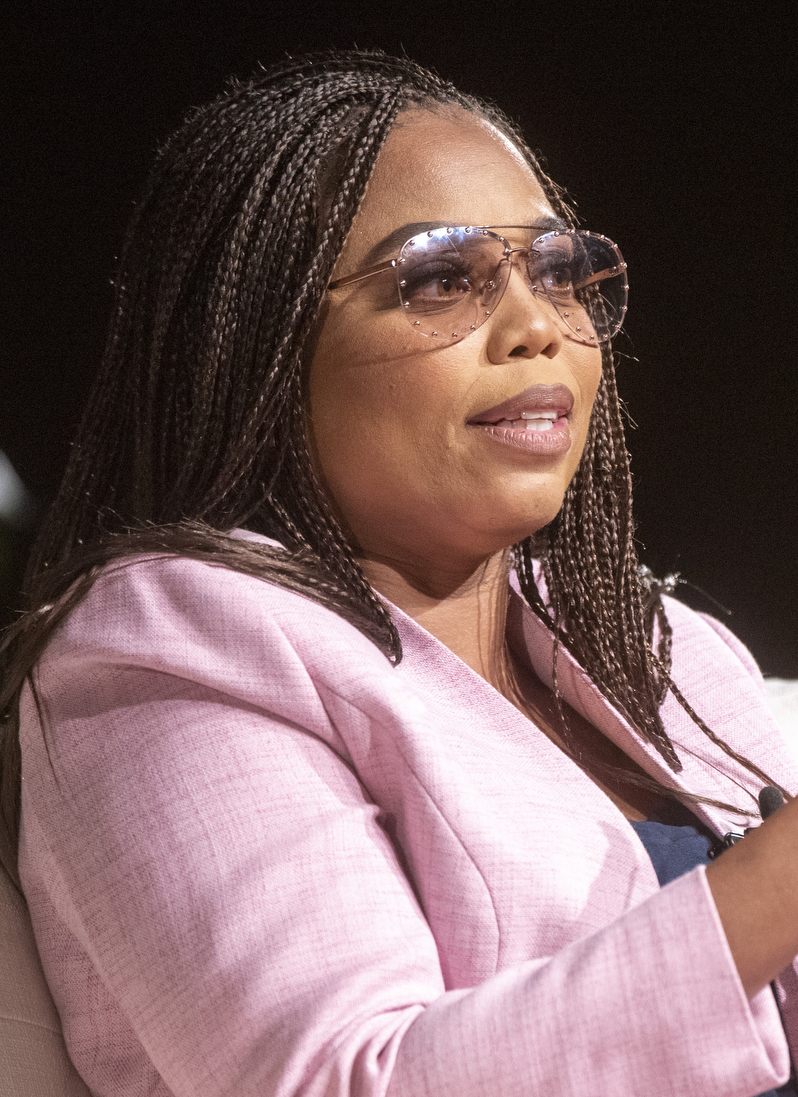
Jemele Hill

The series originally premiered on September 12, 2011, as Numbers Never Lie; initially co-hosted by Charissa Thompson, the program focused primarily on statistics and analytics (hence its name) and was positioned as being of interest to fantasy sports fans. Previously, the show included contributions by ESPN NBA analyst Jalen Rose and frequent ESPN NFL contributor Hugh Douglas.

However, the focus on statistics was eventually downplayed in favor of a conventional debate and discussion format similar to other ESPN daytime programs, albeit one with statistics as a talking point. According to Smith, ESPN's staff felt that viewers were being alienated by the program's focus on "hard analytics". He also remarked that the title of the program had become "deceiving" due to these changes in its format.

Thompson left Numbers Never Lie in June 2012 to take over the co-host's role on SportsNation, and Smith was joined by rotating guest analysts until Rose and Douglas became permanent cohosts on September 10, 2012. Jemele Hill replaced Rose as a co-host on June 3, 2013.

On August 13, 2013, ESPN parted with Hugh Douglas following an altercation with co-host Michael Smith.

On October 27, 2014, ESPN announced that the program would be re-branded as His & Hers on November 3, 2014, after Smith and Hill's ESPN podcast of the same name.

On October 11, 2016, ESPN announced that Smith and Hill had been promoted to hosting a re-launched evening edition of SportsCenter, SC6 (replacing Lindsay Czarniak, who was going on maternity leave and was originally to return in a different role at ESPN afterward, but decided to depart ESPN and began doing work for other networks, including Netflix and Fox Sports), beginning on February 6, 2017, and that His & Hers would be eventually discontinued. Its final episode aired on January 6, 2017.
