= Jemele Hill =

American sports journalist (born 1975)

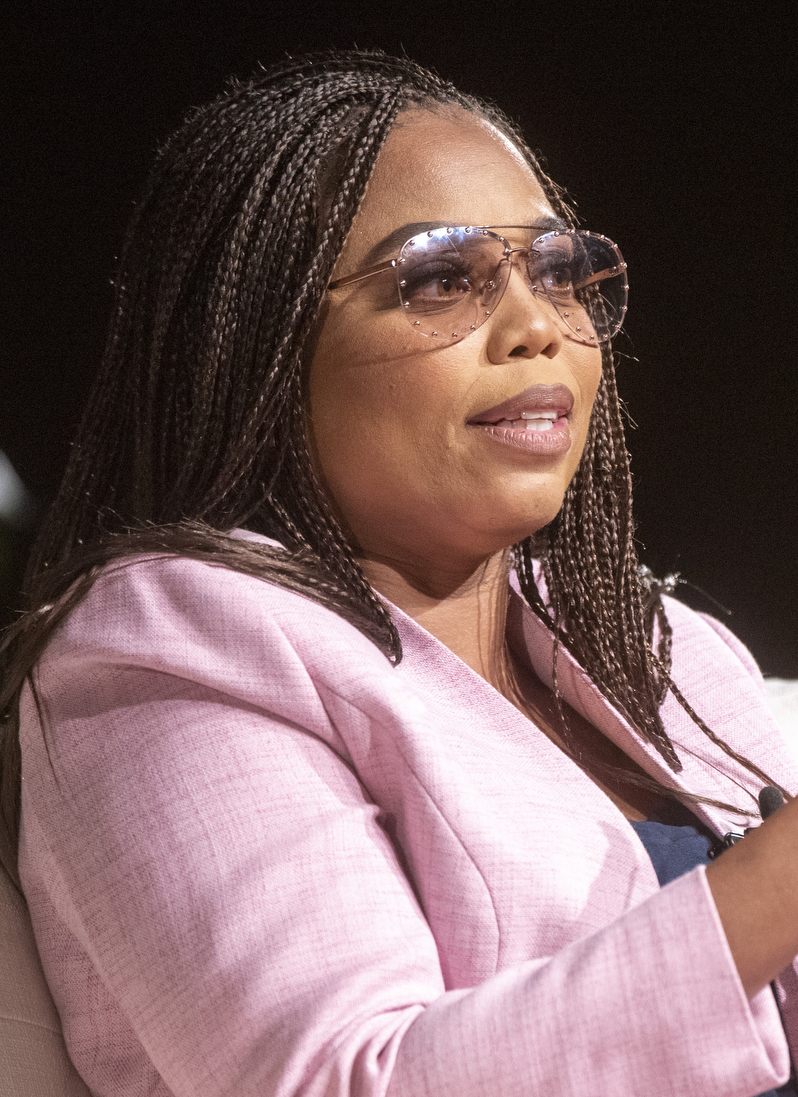
- Hill in 2020
- Born: Jemele Juanita Hill; December 21, 1975 (age 50); Detroit, Michigan, U.S.
- Education: Michigan State University (BA)
- Occupation: Sports journalist
- Years active: 1997–present
- Spouse: Ian Wallace (m. 2019)

Jemele Juanita Hill (/dʒəˈmɛl/ jə-MEL; born December 21, 1975) is an American sports journalist. She worked for the Raleigh News & Observer, the Detroit Free Press, and the Orlando Sentinel. She joined ESPN in 2006 and worked in various roles until 2013, when she succeeded Jalen Rose as host of ESPN2's Numbers Never Lie. The show was rebranded to His & Hers which she co-hosted with Michael Smith. Hill and Smith co-hosted SC6, the 6 p.m. (ET) edition of ESPN's flagship SportsCenter from 2017 to 2018.

She sparked a controversy in 2017 with a series of tweets critical of President Donald Trump including describing him as a white supremacist. She was later suspended for two weeks for a second violation of ESPN's social media policy when she suggested fans of the Dallas Cowboys boycott the team's sponsors in retaliation for Jerry Jones' stance on players kneeling during the national anthem.

In 2017, she won an Emmy Award for Outstanding News Special for the ABC News Special The President and The People. In 2018, Hill left her role as co-host of SC6 and joined the ESPN website, The Undefeated. She left ESPN shortly afterward to work as a contributing writer for The Atlantic. From August 2020 to February 2021, she co-hosted Vice's Cari & Jemele (Won't) Stick to Sports alongside Cari Champion.

Hill is the co-founder of the film and production company Lodge Freeway Media and published her autobiography Uphill: A Memoir in 2022.

== Early life and education ==
Hill was born in Detroit on December 21, 1975. Both of her parents struggled with drug addiction and she was raised by her single mother. She and her mother moved to Houston in 1980, then later back to Detroit. Hill graduated from Mumford High School in 1993, and from Michigan State University in 1997.

== Career ==
=== Newspapers ===
Hill began her career as general assignment sports writer for the Raleigh News & Observer. From 1999 to 2005, she served as a sports writer with the Detroit Free Press, mainly covering Michigan State football and basketball. While at the Free Press, she also covered the 2004 Summer Olympics and the NBA playoffs. Hill worked as a columnist for the Orlando Sentinel from 2005 to 2006.

=== ESPN ===
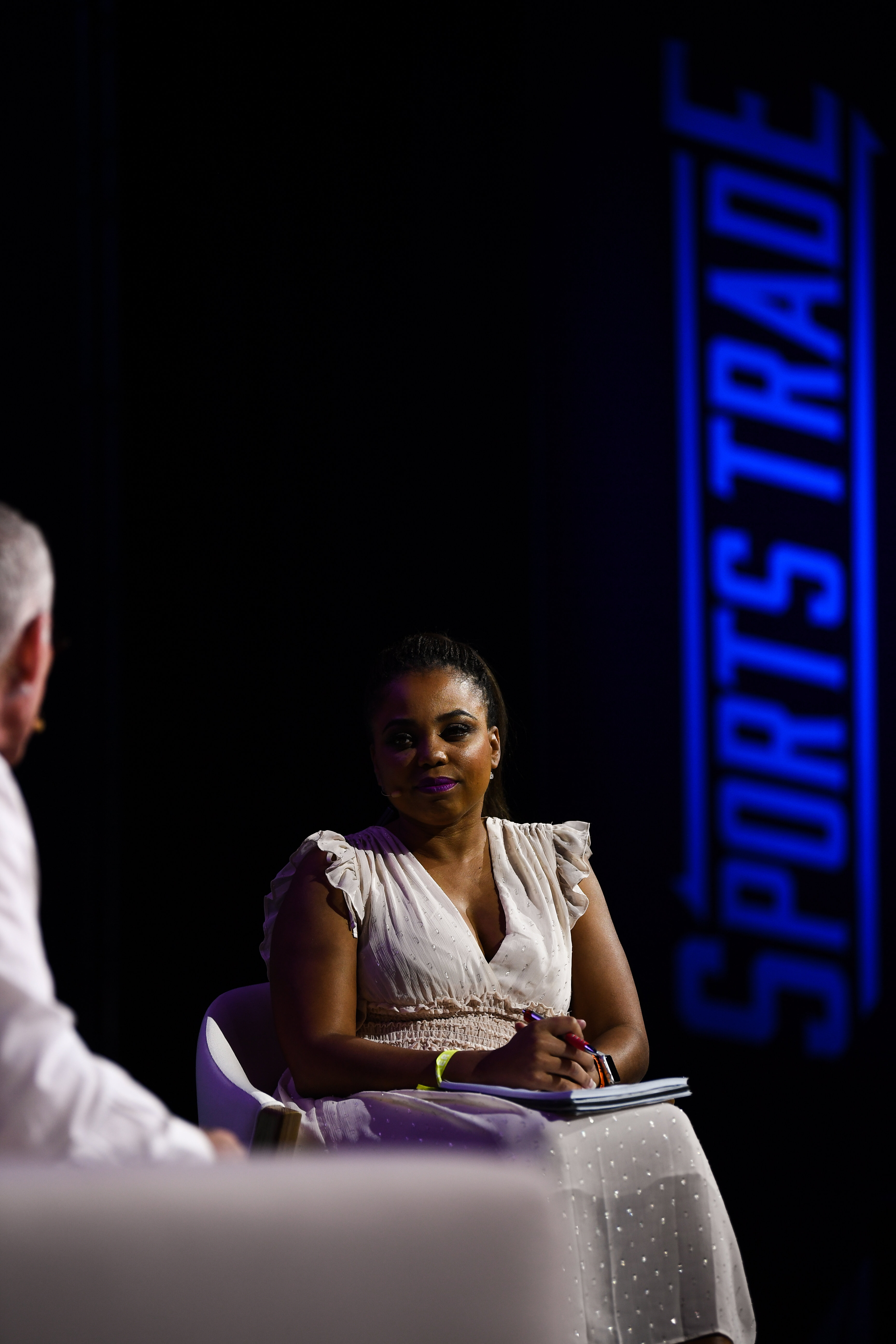
Hill at Web Summit 2018

Hill joined ESPN in November 2006 as a national columnist on ESPN.com. She made regular appearances on television, including SportsCenter and several ESPN programs, including ESPN First Take, Outside the Lines and The Sports Reporters. During the 2012 college football season, she worked on Friday nights as a sideline reporter with Carter Blackburn and Rod Gilmore.

During the 2008 NBA Playoffs, Hill was suspended from her post after referencing Adolf Hitler in an article about the Boston Celtics and the Detroit Pistons. In an editorial describing why she could not support the Celtics, Hill wrote: "Rooting for the Celtics is like saying Hitler was a victim. It's like hoping Gorbachev would get to the blinking red button before Reagan." The comments generated a negative response, and that portion of the editorial was taken out shortly after the column was published. Hill, a Pistons fan, wrote that: "to some degree it was about race. Detroit is 80 percent black, and as my colleague J.A. Adande stated in a fantastic piece on the Celtics earlier this season, the mostly white Celtics teams of the past had a tough time being accepted by black audiences. Boston was viewed by African-Americans as a racially intolerant city." Hill was subsequently suspended for one week and she issued an apology through ESPN.

The network drew criticism for its treatment of Hill, as another employee, former Notre Dame football coach Lou Holtz, also made a Hitler reference in 2008 and was not suspended.

In July 2020, Hill wrote a long article detailing her deep regret for the Hitler reference. She wrote that she felt embarrassed about it immediately after she was called out on it, and still feels embarrassed about it more than a decade later. She concluded that her suspension from ESPN was "a punishment that I deserved."

==== His & Hers ====
In 2011, Hill and Michael Smith began the podcast His & Hers. Its popularity led to ESPN adding Hill to Smith's ESPN2 show Numbers Never Lie in 2013, which was renamed His & Hers a year later. In addition to sports, the show covered social and relationship issues and pop culture, including favorite television shows, music and several movie spoofs. Writing at the Los Angeles Times, Stephen Battaglio contrasted Hill and Smith's style with the "vein-bulging, finger-pointing debates... filling hours of sports talk programming." Instead, he said, "Hill and Smith often agree and never take an opposing view just for the sake of creating provocative television... They are powered by wound-up energy." His & Hers ran through January 2017.

==== SportsCenter ====
On February 6, 2017, Hill and Smith became evening anchors of ESPN's flagship show, SportsCenter. Airing at 6 p.m., their installment of SportsCenter was called "SC6 with Michael and Jemele". Writing at Vibe, Michael Saponara said the new show was expected to focus on "the duo's developed chemistry, and bold personalities instead of the traditional Sportscenter which mostly stuck to highlights of the day's events." ESPN's ratings for the 6 o'clock hour declined after Hill and Smith took over the rebranded SC6.

On September 11, 2017, Hill made a series of tweets critical of President Donald Trump, including describing him as a "white supremacist." ESPN issued a statement saying Hill's comments "do not represent the position of ESPN. We have addressed this with Jemele and she recognizes her actions were inappropriate." Hill later clarified that she stood by her comments as representative of her personal beliefs; "My regret is that my comments and the public way I made them painted ESPN in an unfair light." Some criticized Hill's comments, including White House press secretary Sarah Huckabee Sanders, who called them "a fireable offense by ESPN"; Trump criticized the network and demanded an apology. Others voiced support for Hill and criticized ESPN and the White House's responses, arguing that Hill's comments were accurate and that a White House official suggesting Hill be fired infringed on the First Amendment.

On October 9, 2017, ESPN suspended Hill for two weeks for a "second violation of our social media guidelines". Hill suggested fans upset with Jerry Jones' threat to bench any player who does "anything that is disrespectful to the flag" should boycott the advertisers who support Jones and the Dallas Cowboys. On January 25, 2018, ESPN announced that Hill would anchor her final SC6 on February 2, and begin a new role at The Undefeated, the company's website that covers the intersections of sports and race.

=== The Atlantic ===
On October 1, 2018, The Atlantic announced that she was joining the magazine as a staff writer.

=== Podcast ===
On April 15, 2019, Hill launched her podcast, Jemele Hill is Unbothered, which covers sports, politics and culture. New episodes air twice during the week on Spotify. According to Hill, the podcasts' talk about sports "covers those tricky intersections: race, gender, politics".

In 2020, Hill launched a twice-weekly podcast with Van Lathan on The Ringer called Way Down in the Hole, which recaps each episode of HBO's The Wire.

=== Film and television ===
Hill is the co-founder of a film and television production company named Lodge Freeway Media.

In August 2020, Hill began co-hosting Cari & Jemele (Won't) Stick to Sports with Cari Champion on the Vice on TV network. She played herself in the 2021 sports drama film National Champions.

In February 2022, she was cast in the documentary series Everything's Gonna Be All White, airing on Showtime.

== Honors ==
In 2007, Hill won the inaugural McKenzie Cup, awarded in honor of sports editor Van McKenzie, at the annual Poynter Media Summit.

In 2017, she won an Emmy for Outstanding News Special for the ABC News Special The President and The People.

In 2018, Hill was named journalist of the year by the National Association of Black Journalists, in recognition of "a distinguished body of work with extraordinary depth, scope and significance to the people of the African Diaspora." In 2019, she was named one of Worth's 21 Most Powerful Women in the Business of Sports. She headlined the 2022 Martin Luther King Jr. Cultural Dinner at Illinois State University.

== Filmography ==
Year	Title	Role
2021	National Champions	Herself
2020	Cari & Jemele (Won't) Stick to Sports	Host
2020	Below Deck	Herself
2017–2018	SportsCenter	Anchor
2011–2017	His & Hers	Host

== Published works ==
- Uphill: A Memoir, Henry Holt and Company, New York, 2022.
