= SC6 (TV program) =

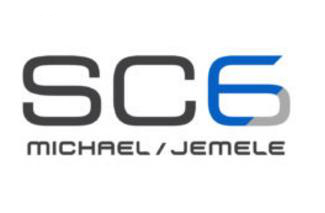
- Also known as: The Six
- Genre: Sports news & commentary
- Based on: SportsCenter; His & Hers
- Presented by: Michael Smith; Jemele Hill
- Country of origin: United States
- Original language: English

Production
- Running time: 1 hour (w/ ads)

Original release
- Release: February 6, 2017 – March 9, 2018

Related
- SportsCenter

SC6, also known as The Six, was a rebranded hour of the ESPN program SportsCenter. The program aired weekdays at 6:00 p.m. ET and was hosted by former His & Hers duo Michael Smith and Jemele Hill. The show featured some elements from His & Hers and, like SportsCenter with SVP, is more freeform than other editions of SportsCenter. In addition, SC6 focused on the night ahead in sports, as well as breaking sports news as warranted.

== History ==
SC6 was created to boost SportsCenter's ratings in the 6 PM hour.

On Monday, October 9, 2017, after calling for viewers who disagree with the Dallas Cowboys' decision not to kneel during the National Anthem to pressure them by boycotting their sponsors, Hill was suspended for two weeks, leaving Smith to host SC6 by himself for the time being. However, he instead opted to sit out the Monday episode, and Matt Barrie ended up hosting.

During the NFL season, SC6 is also seen Mondays in the same 6:00 p.m. ET time slot on ESPN2, due to Monday Night Countdown being aired simultaneously on ESPN (in the case of the latter program, it moved to its current 6:00 p.m. ET time slot in 2014, which resulted in the Monday editions of SportsCenter being moved to ESPN2).

On February 2, 2018, Hill announced that she would be leaving the show to work for ESPN owned The Undefeated, citing her desire to return to more "reporting".

=== Return to Traditional SportsCenter Branding ===
On February 5, 2018, following Hill's departure, Michael Smith became the solo anchor of the 6:00 p.m. ET edition of SportsCenter, which itself reverted to that title as the SC6 branding was dropped. On March 8, 2018, Smith announced that he would also be leaving the show effective immediately.

As of May 14, 2018, the 6:00 p.m. ET weeknight editions of SportsCenter are now co-anchored by Kevin Negandhi.

As of early 2025, Negandhi and Elle Duncan co-anchor the 6 p.m. ET SportsCenter Tuesday through Friday, with Hannah Storm and Jay Harris co-anchoring Mondays at 6 p.m. ET.

== Reception ==
Despite initially doing well ratings-wise, SC6's ratings have been lower than the previous incarnation of SportsCenter since March. The Laughing Place liked the duo's chemistry in the pilot, but hoped future episodes would have more variety. Uproxx said the co-host Michael Smith "represents everything good about ESPN" and applauded both hosts for speaking out on race relations. Many in social media were upset when the series wasn't cancelled when other ESPN employees were laid off.

The series was put in the spotlight after Hill labeled then-current U.S. president Donald Trump a white supremacist, which led Trump to request an apology for this statement. ESPN supposedly wanted to keep Hill from hosting the following episode on Wednesday, but other hosts refused to anchor in her absence, so she hosted that evening. Amidst the controversy SC6's ratings experienced a significant decline of up to 40%.

In May 2018, ESPN announced that SportsCenter's 6:00 p.m. ratings had increased by 10% in the weeks following Hill and Smith's departure. In December 2018, respected ESPN executive Norby Williamson admitted that the network "miscalculated" in trying to center the show around Smith and Hill.
