= Kyle Thousand =

American sports agent (born 1980)

- Born: October 2, 1980 (age 46); Sioux City, Iowa
- Education: University of Iowa; Creighton University School of Law
- Spouse: Charissa Thompson (m. 2020; div. 2022)
- Baseball career
- Centerfield

Kyle Jason Thousand (born October 2, 1980) is an American sports agent and the head of the baseball division at Roc Nation Sports.

== Early life and education ==
Thousand grew up in Sioux City, Iowa, where he attended Sioux City North High School and went on to receive his degree in finance at the University of Iowa. He transferred to the University of Iowa to play both football and baseball when the Iowa State Cyclones baseball program was cut due to budget cuts, but subsequently focused his athletic endeavors on the baseball diamond as the Hawkeyes' starting centerfielder. In 2002, Thousand led the Big Ten in triples with 8, which also tied an Iowa school record and ranked him third in the nation. He was named Third Team All-Big Ten that season. In 2003, Thousand led the team in five offensive categories, including batting average (.355/.370 in the Big Ten Conference), hits (59), doubles (17), runs (42) and stolen bases (20), and was named Second Team All-Big Ten.

In 2007, Thousand graduated from Creighton University School of Law. He began his legal career in Chicago at Katten Muchin Rosenman LLP, where he was an associate in the Corporate, Sports and Entertainment department. While at Katten, Thousand worked as one of the attorneys for Chicago White Sox and Chicago Bulls. In 2011, Thousand entered the sports agency business as an agent at Excel Sports Management, a full-service sports agency headquartered in New York City. Thousand was Casey Close's first hire to join Excel's baseball division. Thousand is a member of the Illinois Bar Association and is a certified player agent with the Major League Baseball Players Association.

== Professional baseball ==
Thousand was drafted by the Toronto Blue Jays in the twenty sixth round of the 2003 MLB draft. He played minor league baseball for Toronto's Single-A Pulaski Blue Jays (2003), but his season and career was cut short due to a slap lesion labrum tear in his right shoulder.

Thousand subsequently retired from professional baseball in 2003 to pursue his J.D. degree.

== Sports agent ==
In May 2015, Thousand was hired away from Excel Sports Management by Roc Nation Sports, where he became Roc Nation's first managing director of Baseball. Roc Nation Sports, a division of Roc Nation, was launched by Jay-Z in the spring of 2013 with his long-time business partner Juan Perez. Roc Nation Baseball is an exclusive baseball division that represents some of the biggest stars in baseball, including Robinson Cano, Yoenis Cespedes and CC Sabathia.

Since 2013, Roc Nation Baseball has negotiated some historic contracts. In December 2013, Cano signed a $240 million, 10-year contract with the Seattle Mariners. The deal Roc Nation brokered made Cano just the fifth player to sign a contract for $200 million or more with only Alex Rodriguez ever signing a contract worth more in guaranteed salary. Cano's contract more than doubled the previous record guarantee for a second baseman and was just the fifth 10-year contract of the past decade. Cano's $240 million contract was $65 million more than the Yankees offered.

In August 2014, Roc Nation negotiated a $72.5 million contract for Rusney Castillo with the Boston Red Sox, the largest contract ever for a player of Cuban descent. It was also the record for any amateur player and any international free agent.

For Yoenis Cespedes, Thousand negotiated a three-year, $75 million contract with the New York Mets that included an opt-out after the first season (2016). The $25 million average annual value of the deal matched the highest average annual value ever for an outfielder. Cespedes was guaranteed $27.5 million if he opted out after the first season, which would be the second-highest AAV ever for a position player. Cespedes was able to re-sign with the Mets only because Thousand worked with the Mets in September 2015 to amend his existing contract and allow the Mets equal footing in free agency.

Cespedes opted out of his contract after the 2016 season and in November 2016 re-signed for $110 million over four years, setting records for annual average value ($27.5 million) records for an outfielder and any Mets player in franchise history and the second-highest AAV ever for a non-pitcher. In sum, it guaranteed Cespedes $137.6 million over five years with the Mets.

According to The New York Times, "Cespedes's agents also presented the Mets with an advanced metric they developed that tried to measure how much Cespedes was worth to the team in terms of generating ticket, media, merchandise and sponsorship revenue. They presented a 100-page book to make their case to the Mets."

== Personal life ==
Thousand resides in New York City. In January 2020, Thousand was engaged to television host and sportscaster Charissa Thompson. They married in December 2020, at a small ceremony with 10 guests. It was announced she was divorcing Thousand in April 2022, after separating the previous December.
