= Cari Champion =

American television host

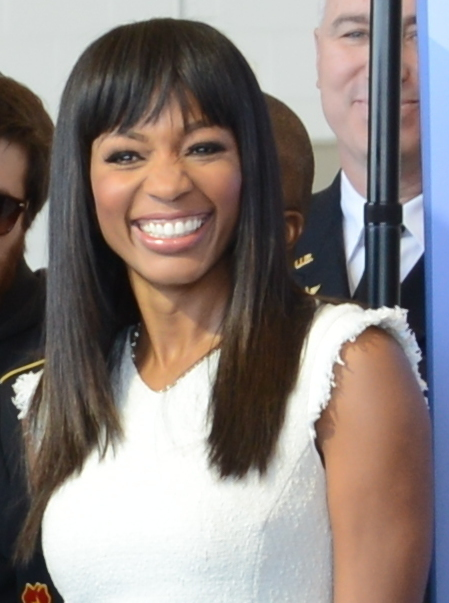
- Champion in November 2014
- Born: June 1, 1978 (age 48); Pasadena, California, U.S.
- Education: University of California, Los Angeles
- Occupations: Broadcast journalist, television personality
- Notable credit(s): Tennis Channel (2009–2012); First Take (2012–2015); SportsCenter (2015–2020); SportsNation (2018)
- Website: carichampion.com

Cari Champion (born June 1, 1978) is an American broadcast journalist and television personality. She was the host of The Cari Champion Show on Amazon Prime Video Sports Talk. She has worked as an anchor and reporter for the Tennis Channel and as the host of ESPN2's First Take. In July 2014, Champion became an anchor for ESPN's flagship program SportsCenter. After almost eight years at the network, she left ESPN in February 2020. From August 2020 to February 2021, she co-hosted Cari & Jemele (Won't) Stick to Sports with Jemele Hill on the Vice on TV network.

== Early life ==
Champion was raised in Pasadena, California. Champion attended the University of California, Los Angeles (UCLA), where she majored in English and minored in mass communications. She wrote for the Daily Bruin and was inspired to pursue a career in journalism by UCLA alumni, including Matea Gold of the Washington Post, who was the editor in chief of the student newspaper. Champion was drawn to journalism with goals of transforming negative stereotypes of African Americans: "I wanted to give people a voice that didn't have a voice. I'm always fighting for the underdog. I don't know where I got it from, but I've been like that all my life. That's why I love journalism." In her junior year, she studied in Washington, D.C., and earned an internship at VOA. Champion graduated from UCLA in 2000, with an English degree.

== Career ==
=== Early broadcasting work ===
Champion began her broadcasting career at several television stations. She moved to West Virginia for her first reporting job. She later said of working there: "I was a one-man-band carrying a camera and a tripod and that was God-awful. But I loved it because I wanted to do it. I always wanted to be a reporter." She was a reporter at the Orange County Newschannel in Santa Ana, California, before joining WPTV-TV in West Palm Beach, Florida, in the same capacity in 2002.

In November 2007, while working as an anchor for WGCL-TV in Atlanta, Champion was fired for allegedly uttering a profanity over the air. She appealed the firing and said in an interview for the Maynard Institute that the floor director had not cued her and her co-anchor following a commercial break, and that the microphone picked up a conversation they were having about an unhandy mechanical screenwriter: "I called the screenwriter a 'mothersucka' not the f-bomb." She was rehired in January 2008, but left shortly after in March for a broadcasting job outside of Atlanta.

After moving to Florida, Champion covered news such as human interest stories and devastating hurricanes in the state. While working as a reporter there, she developed an affinity for tennis after covering players such as Venus and Serena Williams: "They made me love the sport even more. They opened the door to tennis for so many different people." She subsequently auditioned for the Tennis Channel's burgeoning news department and was one of three women selected from a pool of more than fifty candidates. She joined the network in 2009. Champion worked as a courtside reporter, and anchored the channel's Court Report news segment. She also worked as an entertainment reporter for the Starz network and shows such as The Insider and Hollywood 411.

=== Career at ESPN ===
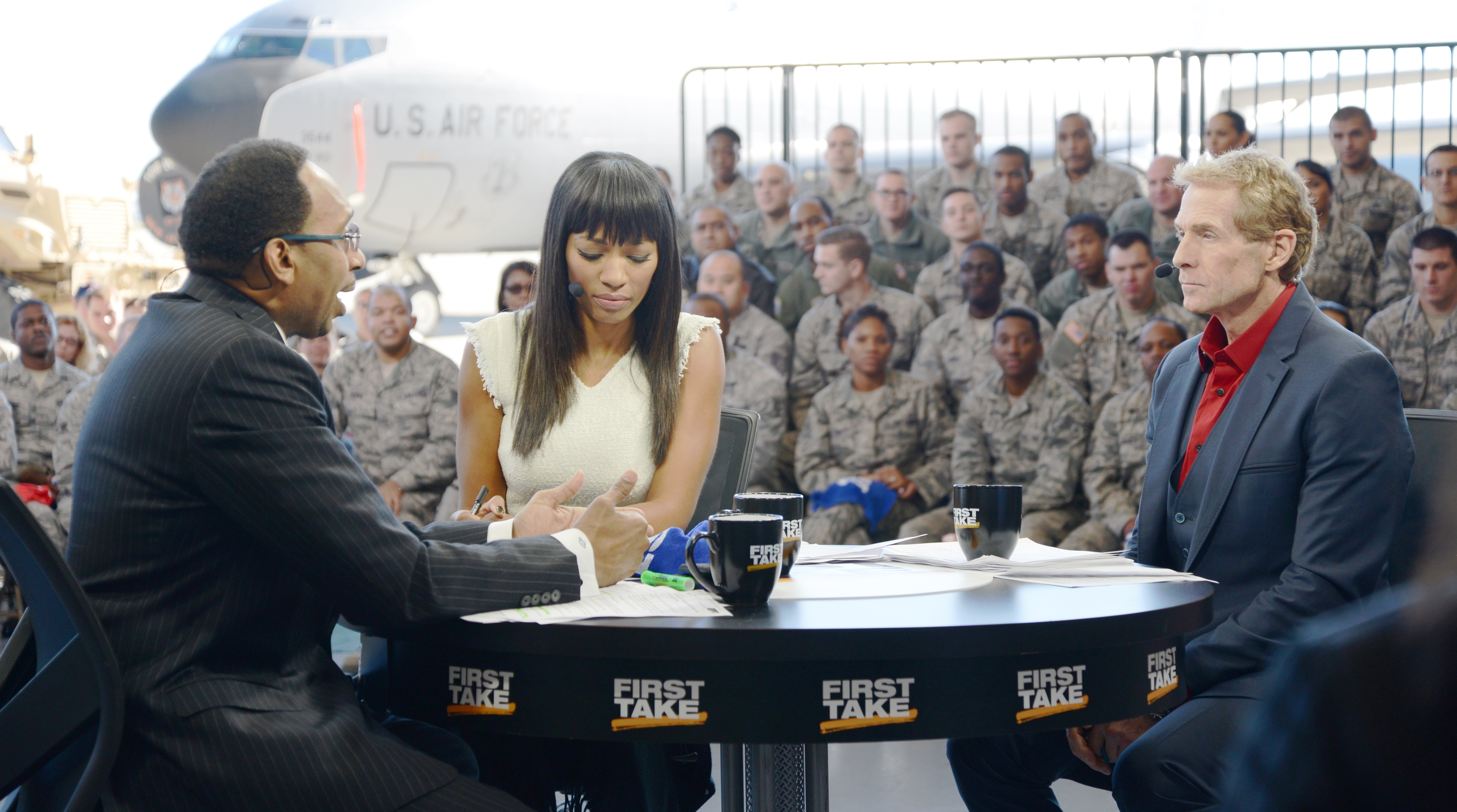
Champion between Stephen A. Smith (left), and Skip Bayless (right), filming First Take at Joint Base McGuire-Dix-Lakehurst in 2014

On October 1, 2012, Champion joined ESPN as the new host of ESPN2's live debate show First Take. She was hired over Heidi Watney and Jemele Hill for the job. As the show's host, she moderated debates between sports pundits Skip Bayless and Stephen A. Smith, who she said had "the biggest, strongest personalities in the building". After proposing ideas for stories to ESPN, Champion made her journalistic debut for the network on November 4, 2014, when she profiled and interviewed American football quarterback Cam Newton in a segment for E:60. That same day, she was the target of racist and sexist tweets from comedian Artie Lange, who jokingly portrayed himself and Champion in a sexual fantasy set during slavery. Lange tweeted an apology to Champion the following day and ESPN issued a statement to Sports Illustrated that rebuked Lange's tweets, while Champion did not respond publicly.

After petitioning ESPN for six months to become an anchor on SportsCenter, Champion was promoted to the position in June 2015. She hosted her last episode of First Take on June 19 and began anchoring morning editions of SportsCenter in July.

=== Career at Amazon Prime Video ===
In 2022, Embassy Row announced that Champion will host The Cari Champion Show on Amazon Prime Video. On November 14, 2022, Champion made her debut on The Cari Champion Show.
