= Michael Smith (sports reporter) =

American sports journalist (born 1979)

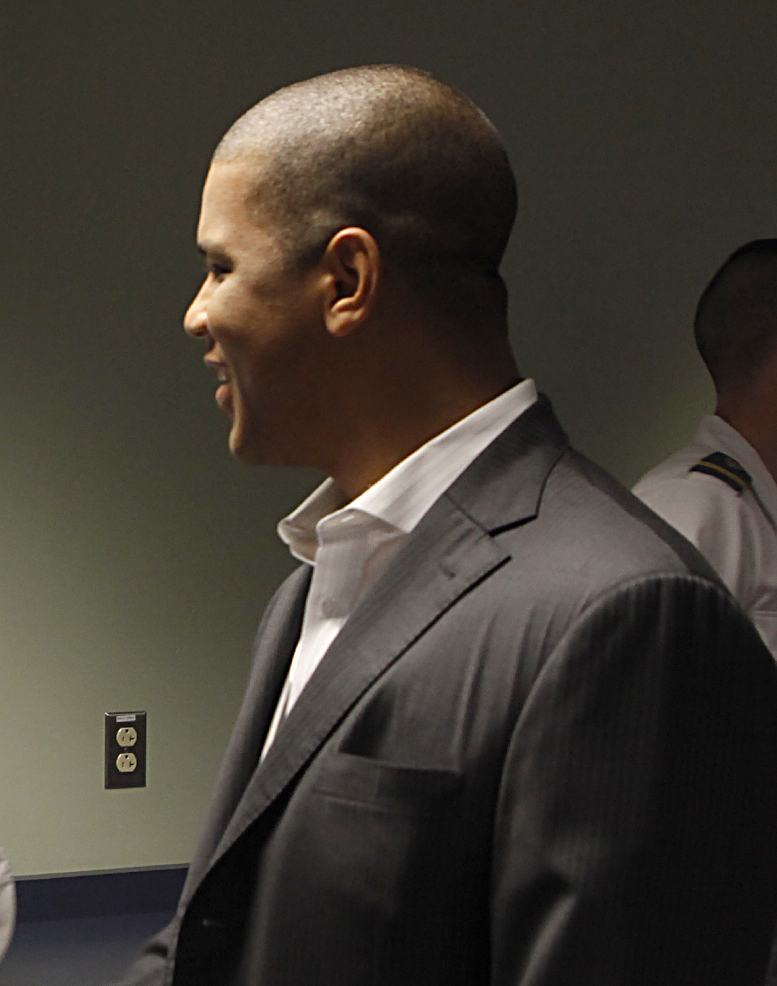
- Born: August 1, 1979 (age 47); New Orleans, Louisiana, U.S.
- Education: Loyola University New Orleans
- Occupations: TV sports commentator, sportswriter
- Employer(s): ESPN (2004–2019); NBC Sports (2020–present); Amazon (2022–present)
- Notable credit(s): Around The Horn; Numbers Never Lie; His & Hers; Mike & Mike; Highly Questionable

Michael Anthony Smith II (born August 1, 1979) is an American sports journalist, best known for his time as an ESPN commentator and host. He is the former co-host of the Peacock sports talk show Brother From Another.

== Career ==
Smith covered the New England Patriots and the NFL from 2001 to 2004 as a reporter for The Boston Globe. He then joined ESPN full-time in September 2004 as a senior writer for ESPN.com and an NFL Insider for SportsCenter and NFL Live. He also offered reporting and commentary on various ESPN and ESPN2 studio shows, as well as for ESPN Radio. Smith was an original correspondent for E:60, which launched in 2007.

In 2009, Smith transitioned to anchoring and guest hosting such programs as Mike & Mike, First Take, SportsNation, Outside the Lines, NFL Live, and College Football Live. From 2011 to 2014, he hosted Numbers Never Lie every weekday on ESPN2. He co-hosted ESPN SC6 with Jemele Hill as well as the weekly His & Hers Podcast on ESPN Radio and iTunes. Also, Smith was a regular panelist on ESPN's Around the Horn. Smith's tenure at ESPN covered 15 years; he left the network in 2019, after reaching a contract buyout agreement with the network.

In August 2020, Smith co-founded Inflection Point Entertainment, a multimedia company.

He appeared in and served as an executive producer on the 2021 feature film, National Champions.

On September 14, 2020, Smith joined NBC Sports to co-host a new show with Michael Holley, Brother From Another, on Peacock.

In 2022, Amazon named Smith as a correspondent for Thursday Night Football.
