= SportsNation (TV program) =

- Presented by: Michelle Beadle (2009–2012; 2014–2018); Colin Cowherd (2009–2012); Charissa Thompson (2012–2013); Marcellus Wiley (2013–2018); Max Kellerman (2013–2016); LZ Granderson (2017–2018); Cari Champion (2018); Ashley Brewer (2021); Taylor Twellman (2021–2022); Treavor Scales (2021)
- Country of origin: United States
- No. of episodes: 1,456

Production
- Production locations: Bristol, Connecticut (2009–2012); Los Angeles, California
- Running time: 30–60 minutes

Original release
- Network: ESPN2 (2009–2016); ESPN (2016–2018); ESPN+ (2021–2022)
- Release: July 6, 2009 – 2022

SportsNation is a sports-related television program that airs on ESPN+. In its original run, it aired on ESPN, ESPN2, and ESPNEWS. The program was based on SportsNation, the fan forum and poll section of ESPN.com. The show was typically 60% material generated or suggested by fans, including videos from the Internet, athlete tweets, and online polling. The show had aired in occasional segments on ESPN and ESPN2 before becoming a fixture of ESPN2's weekday afternoon block in 2009.

== History ==
From July 6, 2009 to December 20, 2012, SportsNation was taped at ESPN's world headquarters in Bristol, Connecticut. The initial hosts were Colin Cowherd and Michelle Beadle, who joined ESPN from the YES Network. On June 1, 2012, Beadle left to join the NBC family of networks as a sports and entertainment contributor and was replaced by Numbers Never Lie host Charissa Thompson. Cowherd announced his departure from SportsNation in September 2012 to focus more on his radio work (and possibly because he did not want to make the move across the country; ESPN Radio does not have a west-coast base of operations), and his final episode aired on December 21, 2012. Wiley, who is a contributor to various programs on ESPN and who is based in Los Angeles, was announced as his replacement. In 2013, Thompson left the show and was replaced by Max Kellerman. On March 3, 2014, Beadle returned to SportsNation. On July 10, 2016, it was announced that Kellerman was leaving the show to join First Take as the official replacement for Skip Bayless. Kellerman's last show was July 15, 2016. On February 9, 2018, Beadle left the show again, this time for a new morning sports show on ESPN called Get Up!, and would be replaced by Cari Champion. In July 2018, Wiley left the show and ESPN to join Fox Sports 1. As part of an ESPN schedule realignment beginning September 2018, High Noon, which originally aired at 12 p.m. ET, was moved to SportsNation's 4 p.m. ET time slot, effectively canceling the show. SportsNation's final episode aired on August 24, 2018.

The show was renewed in January 2021 on ESPN+. It lasted two years.

== College football edition ==
In September 2010, a college football-centric edition of SportsNation premiered on ESPNU. The program airs at 10 AM every Saturday during the college football regular season and (as of 2012) is hosted by Cassidy Hubbarth and Christian Fauria.

== Audience ==
The average audience of SportsNation is very young (13–25 years) compared to other ESPN programming. ESPN noted that the show's target audience is college students, men in their 20s, and teenage boys. These are demographics ESPN has been struggling to capture in years past. The average age of the typical audience for SportsNation is 30, according to creator Jamie Horowitz.

== See also ==
- The Herd with Colin Cowherd
- Nación ESPN — Spanish version
