= Fernández =

Surname list

Fernández / Fernandes
Origin
- Meaning: Son of Fernando or Fernán
- Region of origin: Spain, Portugal

Other names
- Variant forms: Fernandes, Hernández, Hernandes

Fernández (Spanish pronunciation: [feɾˈnandeθ]) is a Spanish patronymic surname meaning "son of Fernando" of Germanic origin. The Germanic name Ferdinand that it derives from (Gothic: Frið-nanð) means "brave traveler." The Portuguese version of this surname is Fernandes. The Arabized version is Ibn Faranda and it was used by the Mozarabs and Muwallads in Al-Andalus. Fernández was on the list of Officers and Sailors in the First Voyage of Columbus. The name is popular in Spanish speaking countries and former colonies.

The Anglicization of this surname is Fernander. In countries such as Singapore, Malaysia and India, the similar-sounding Portuguese-origin surname Fernándes also shares the same Anglicized form Fernandez, resulting in overlaps between the two.

== Arts & culture ==
- Almudena Fernández (born 1977), Spanish fashion model
- Clotilde González de Fernández (1880–1935), Argentine educator, writer
- Emilio Fernández (1904–1986), Mexican actor, screenwriter and director
- Enrique Fernández Arbós (1863–1939), Spanish composer
- Florentino Fernández (actor) (born 1972), Spanish actor, comedian and showman
- Freddy Fernández (actor), "El Pichi" (1934–1995), Mexican actor
- Giselle Fernández (born 1961), American television journalist
- Grae Fernandez (born 2001), Filipino actor
- Gregorio Fernández (1576–1636), Spanish sculptor
- Inés Fernández Moreno (1947–2024), Argentine writer
- Isabel Fernández (born 1980), Bolivian journalist
- Jacqueline Fernandez (born 1985), Sri Lankan actress and model
- Johanna Fernández (historian) (born 1970), Dominican-American historian
- Julie Fernandez (born 1974), British actress
- Juris or Julie Iris Fernandez (born 1978), Filipino singer and songwriter
- Khotan Fernandez (born 1973), Mexican actor and artist
- Laura Fernandez (born 1960), Canadian illustrator
- Lexi Fernandez (born 1995), Filipino actress
- Macedonio Fernández (1874–1952), Argentine writer
- Mark Anthony Fernandez (born 1979), Filipino actor
- Nino Fernandez (born 1984), Indonesian actor
- Olga Fernández Latour de Botas (1935–2025), Argentine folklorist, historian and poet
- Pablo Armando Fernández (1930–2021), Cuban poet and writer
- Pedro Fernández (born 1969), Mexican recording artist and actor
- Peter Fernandez (1927–2010), American voice actor and writer
- Pops Fernandez (born 1966), Filipina singer and actress
- Rudy Fernandez (actor) (1952–2008), Filipino actor
- Shiloh Fernandez (born 1985), American actor
- Stefanía Fernández (born 1990), Venezuelan model and 2009 Miss Universe
- Vicente Fernández (1940–2021), Mexican singer, producer and actor
- Xandru Fernández (born 1970), Spanish writer

== Disambiguation ==
- Alberto Fernández (disambiguation)
- Alejandro Fernández (disambiguation)
- Alex Fernandez (disambiguation)
- Carlos Fernández (disambiguation)
- Federico Fernández (disambiguation)
- Francisco Fernández (disambiguation)
- Frank Fernández (disambiguation)
- Gabriel Fernández (disambiguation)
- Guillermo Fernández (disambiguation)
- José Fernández (disambiguation)
- Julián Fernández (disambiguation)
- Mariano Fernández (disambiguation)
- Mario Fernández (disambiguation)
- Oliver Fernández (disambiguation)
- Rafael Fernández (disambiguation)
- Tomás Fernández (disambiguation)

== Law ==
- Bernelito Fernandez, Filipino associate justice of the Sandiganbayan (2016–2025)

== Military ==
- Bob Fernandez (1924–2024), American veteran, survivor of the attack on Pearl Harbor
- David Negrete Fernández (born 1883), Mexican colonel
- José María Bravo Fernández-Hermosa (1917–2009), Spanish fighter pilot
- Manuel J. Fernandez (1925–1980), American military pilot

== Politicians ==
- Andrea Fernández Benéitez (born 1992), Spanish politician
- Aníbal Fernández (born 1957), Argentine politician and Interior Minister
- Bel Pozueta Fernández (born 1965), Spanish politician
- Cristina Fernández de Kirchner (born 1953), Argentine politician and President of Argentina
- Happy Fernandez (1939–2013), American politician
- Hendrik Fernandez (1932–2014), Indonesian politician
- Isaac Fernandez, American politician
- José María Aierdi Fernández de Barrena (born 1958), Spanish politician
- Julie Fernandez-Fernandez (born 1972), Belgian politician
- Katherine Fernandez Rundle (born 1950), American politician
- Laura Fernández Piña (born 1971), Mexican politician
- Leonel Fernández (born 1953), President of the Dominican Republic
- Matilde Fernández (born 1950), Spanish social feminist and politician
- Mauricio Fernández Garza (1950–2025), Mexican politician and businessman
- Próspero Fernández Oreamuno (1834–1885), President of Costa Rica
- Rosario Fernández (born 1955), Prime Minister of Peru
- Victoria Eugenia Fernández de Córdoba, 18th Duchess of Medinaceli (1917–2013), Spanish duchess

== Religion ==
- Cipriano García Fernández (1931–2025), Spanish born-Argentine Roman Catholic prelate
- Óscar Fernández Guillén (born 1949), Costa Rican Roman Catholic bishop
- René Fernández Apaza (1924–2013), Bolivian Roman Catholic archbishop
- Víctor Manuel Fernández (born 1962), Argentine Catholic archbishop

== Sciences ==
- Arran Fernandez (born 1995), English mathematics prodigy
- Mary Fernández, American computer scientist
- Nevenka Fernández (born 1974), Spanish economist
- Nivia Fernández Hernández, Puerto Rican dietician and academic administrator

== Sports ==
- Adrián Fernández (born 1965), Mexican race car driver
- Adriana Fernández (born 1971), Mexican long-distance runner
- Anaelys Fernández (born 1979), Cuban discus thrower
- Andrea Fernández (born 2006), Spanish rhythmic gymnast
- Augusto Fernández (born 1986), Argentine footballer
- Christian Fernández (born 1985), Spanish footballer
- Clarisa Fernández (born 1981), Argentine tennis player
- Dalixia Fernández (born 1977), Cuban beach volleyball player
- Douglas Fernández (born 1959), Venezuelan decathlete
- Enzo Fernández (born 2001), Argentinian footballer
- Enzo Zidane Fernández (born 1995), French-Spanish football player
- Estefanía Fernández (born 1996), Spanish canoeist
- Estela Fernandez (born 1991), Spanish footballer
- Félix Omar Fernández (born 1976), Puerto Rican track and field athlete
- Fernando Fernández Escribano (born 1979), Spanish footballer
- Florentino Fernández (boxer) (1936–2013), Cuban boxer
- Freddy Fernández (footballer) (born 1974), Costa Rican footballer
- Gastón Fernández (born 1983), Argentine footballer
- Geovane Fernández (born 1982), Uruguayan cyclist
- Gerardo Fernández (born 1977), Argentine cyclist
- German Fernandez (born 1990), American middle-distance runner
- Gigi Fernández (born 1964), Puerto Rican tennis player
- Gualberto Fernández (1941–2026), Salvadoran footballer
- Ignacio Fernández (born 1990), Argentine footballer
- Ignacio Fernández Lobbe (born 1974), Argentine rugby union player
- Isabel Fernández (judoka) (born 1972), Spanish judoka
- Jana Fernández (born 2002), Spanish footballer
- Jérôme Fernandez (born 1977), French handball player
- Jordi Fernández (born 1982), Spanish basketball coach
- José Ignacio "Nacho" Fernández (born 1990), Spanish footballer
- Juan Martín Fernández Lobbe (born 1981), Argentine rugby player
- Junior Fernández (born 1997), Dominican baseball player
- Krystal Fernandez (born 1971), American sports journalist
- Lara Fernandez (born 1996), Spanish kickboxer
- Leylah Fernandez (born 2002), Canadian tennis player
- Lisa Fernandez (born 1971), American softball player
- Luis Fernández (born 1959), Spanish-born French football manager
- Manny Fernandez (American football) (born 1946), American football player
- Manny Fernandez (wrestler) (born 1954), American wrestler
- Manny Fernandez (ice hockey) (born 1974), Canadian ice hockey player
- Mary Joe Fernández (born 1971), American tennis player
- Matías Fernández (born 1986), Chilean footballer
- Mervyn Fernandez (born 1959), American football player
- Nehemiah Fernandez-Veliz (born 2004), French footballer
- Rowen Fernández (born 1978), South African footballer
- Rudy Fernandez (triathlete) (1947–2022), Filipino triathlete
- Rudy Fernández (basketball) (born 1985), Spanish basketball player
- Serrana Fernández (born 1973), Uruguayan swimmer
- Sid Fernandez (born 1962), American baseball player
- Tania Fernández (canoeist) (born 1992), Spanish marathon canoeist
- Tony Fernández (1962–2020), Dominican baseball player
- Zachary Fernandez (born 2001), Canadian footballer

== See also ==
- Fernandes
- Hernandes
- Hernández
