= Francisco Javier Fernández =

Francisco Javier Fernández may refer to:

- Francisco Javier Fernández Clamont (born 1972), Mexican politician affiliated to the PRI
- Francisco Fernández (Chilean footballer) (born 1975), Chilean footballer born Francisco Javier Fernández Torrejón
- Paquillo Fernández more known as (born 1977), Spanish race walker born Francisco Javier Fernández Peláez
- Fran Fernández more known as (born 1980), Spanish football manager born Francisco Javier Fernández Díaz
- Javi Fernández (footballer, born 1988) (born 1988), Spanish footballer born Francisco Javier 'Javi' Fernández Luque
- Francisco Javier Fernández (politician), Francisco Javier Fernández, Andalusian politician

== See also ==
- Javier Fernández (disambiguation)
- Francisco Fernández (disambiguation)
