= Andrew Siciliano =

American sports announcer (born 1974)

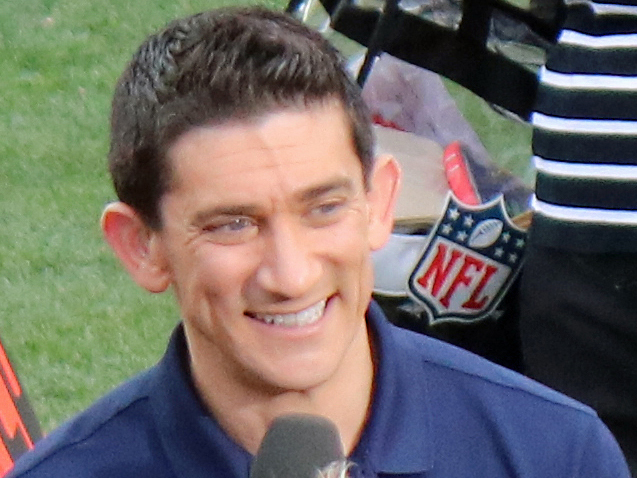
- Siciliano in 2016.
- Born: August 28, 1974 (age 52); Reston, Virginia, U.S.
- Education: Syracuse University
- Occupation: Sportscaster
- Employer(s): National Football League; NBC Sports

Andrew David Siciliano (born August 28, 1974) is an American sports television anchor, reporter and radio broadcaster. He is the play-by-play announcer for the National Football League's Cleveland Browns Radio Network, and for Big Ten Football on NBC.

Siciliano was host of the NFL Sunday Ticket Red Zone on DirecTV from 2005 to 2023. He previously was also a host on NFL Network, and was part of NBC's Olympic coverage.

== Education and early career ==
Siciliano was born in Reston, Virginia to a Jewish mother, and an Italian father who was an attorney at the Federal Reserve. He attended South Lakes High School.

He attended Syracuse University's S. I. Newhouse School of Public Communications from 1992 to 1996. At Syracuse, he served as Assistant Sports Director at WAER, a student-run radio network. He also worked at the commercial WSYR (AM), covering fires and City Hall. He was a regular columnist for the Daily Orange, Syracuse University's independent student newspaper, and split play-by-play duties for WAER-FM during the 1996 Final Four March Madness game between Syracuse vs Mississippi State. Siciliano graduated in 1996 with a BA in broadcast journalism.

== Professional career ==
Following his academic career, Siciliano accepted a dual anchor/reporter role at WMAQ-670 AM in Chicago, Illinois. By 1999, he was hosting the Chicago Bears's postgame talk show for the now-defunct WMAQ. During his tenure at WMAQ, he was honored with multiple awards, including two AIR awards for Best Sports Reporter and Best Anchor.

In 2000, Siciliano moved to Los Angeles to join Fox Sports Radio. He served as co-host of The Tony Bruno Morning Extravaganza, along with various fill-in anchor roles. He later moved to hosting the weeknight program Game Time Live, with Krystal Fernandez. While with FSR, he served as the lead play by play announcer for the Las Vegas Gladiators of the Arena Football League. In 2006, Siciliano moved from the Gladiators to the Los Angeles Avengers in order to work closer to home. In January 2011, Siciliano was replaced by Max Kellerman at ESPN affiliate 710 AM (KSPN), where he had been hosting LA Sports Live with co-host Mychal Thompson.

Siciliano did St. Louis Rams preseason games as a play-by-play announcer, along with former Rams Pro Bowler Torry Holt and Hall of Famer Marshall Faulk locally in St. Louis on KTVI-TV Fox 2. Holt and Faulk served as color commentators for the broadcasts, and the two were joined by Siciliano, who handled the play-by-play duties. He continued in the same role after the team's return to Los Angeles.

From its inception in 2005 to 2023, he was the sole host of NFL Sunday Ticket Red Zone, airing on DirecTV's Red Zone Channel. He also served as a host for NFL Total Access on the NFL Network. On April 4, 2024, it was announced that NFL Network were making staff cuts and Siciliano along with three other NFL Network employees were being laid off from their jobs with the channel.

Siciliano has also hosted coverage of the Olympic Games in 2014 and 2016 for NBC Sports's coverage, mainly for the Gold Zone show, which features a whiparound format equivalent to that of Red Zone. He returned for the 2024 Summer Olympics, this time in partnership with Scott Hanson, his former in-house 'rival' on NFL RedZone.

For the 2023 season, Siciliano became a regular play-by-play announcer for the Big Ten Football on NBC.

On September 5, 2024, Siciliano was officially named the new play-by-play announcer for the Cleveland Browns Radio Network, after longtime announcer and WKYC sports director Jim Donovan was forced to retire from both positions due to an aggressive recurrence of leukemia. He had previously called three games for the team in the 2023 season as Donovan underwent treatment.

== Personal life ==
Though a Washington D.C. area native, Siciliano's father is a native of the Greater Cleveland area, and would frequently bring Andrew with him to his hometown to visit family, leading Siciliano to become a Cleveland Guardians and Cleveland Browns fan.

Siciliano had considered being the latter's play-by-play announcer his ultimate goal in life, though he expressed humility and regret that he was elevated to the position due to Donovan's illness forcing his retirement. He maintains a love for radio despite his television career.
