= Javier Fernández =

Javier Fernández is the name of:

- Javier Fernández (Spanish politician) (born 1948), Spanish politician and President of the Principality of Asturias
  - Javier Fernández government, the regional government of Javier Fernández
- Javier Fernández Aguado (born 1961), Spanish PhD in Economics, author and expert in Management
- Javier Fernández (judoka) (born 1981), Spanish judoka
- Javi Fernández (footballer, born 1988), Spanish footballer
- Javier Fernández (figure skater) (born 1991), Spanish figure skater
- Javier Fernández (footballer, born 1994), Uruguayan footballer
- Javi Fernández (footballer, born 1997), Spanish footballer
- Javier Fernandez (American politician), member of the Florida House of Representatives
- Javi Fernández (footballer, born 2006), Spanish footballer

== See also ==
- Francisco Javier Fernández (disambiguation)
- Javier Ferrer Fernández (born 1961), Puerto Rican attorney
- Javi Navas (born 1991), Spanish footballer born Javier Fernández Herranz
- Bicho (footballer, born 1996), Spanish footballer born Javier Fernández Abruñedo
