= NFL RedZone =

American sports television channel

NFL RedZone from NFL Network
- Country: United States
- Headquarters: Hollywood Park; Inglewood, California, U.S.

Programming
- Language: English
- Picture format: 1080i (HDTV) (HD feed downgraded to letterboxed 480i for SDTV sets)

Ownership
- Owner: NFL Media (ESPN via ABC Inc. and the NFL)
- Sister channels: ABC; ESPN; ESPN2; ESPN DTC; ESPN+ ESPNews; ESPNU; ESPN Deportes; ACC Network; SEC Network; NFL Network

History
- Launched: September 13, 2009; 17 years ago

Links
- Website: www.nfl.com/redzone

NFL RedZone (stylized as NFL RedZone from NFL Network) is an American sports television channel owned and operated by NFL Media, a joint venture of ESPN (via ABC Inc.) and the NFL. It is named after the term "red zone", the part of the football field between the 20-yard line and the goal line. As a "special" game-day exclusive, it broadcasts on Sundays during the NFL regular season from 1:00 p.m. to 8:00 p.m. Eastern (10:00 a.m. to 5:00 p.m. Pacific), or when the next-to-last afternoon window game ends. RedZone provides "whip around" simulcast coverage of all Sunday afternoon games airing in-progress on CBS and Fox.

RedZone is based out of the NFL Network studios and is hosted by Scott Hanson. The channel prides itself on showing "every touchdown from every game," and is closely linked to Fantasy Football, reporting superlatives and tracking various statistical accomplishments throughout the afternoon. RedZone monitors coverage of the traditional Sunday 1:00 p.m. "early" games and 4:05/4:25 p.m. "late" games.

RedZone is offered by numerous pay TV providers. DIRECTV aired a separate, similar program which was replaced by NFL RedZone in autumn 2023. This change was made when YouTube purchased the rights to the out-of-market NFL Sunday Ticket package.

In August 2025, ESPN announced RedZone would also became part of its new direct-to-consumer package.

RedZone is also broadcast live internationally. In the United Kingdom it is shown on the Sky Sports Mix television channel, and in Canada, Germany and Italy on DAZN, every Sunday and for the full seven hours. It is a direct simulcast of the American feed, with no commercial breaks, live coverage of both the early and late games and Hanson hosting. The major difference is that when there is only one Sunday afternoon game left being played, international viewers will be able to see it to its conclusion on RedZone, while domestic viewers will be switched to the day's highlights and advised to switch their channels to protect the exclusive broadcast rights of both CBS/Fox (whichever is broadcasting the final game remaining) and NFL Sunday Ticket, which would still televise the game.

In August of 2025, ESPN purchased both the NFL Network as well as NFL RedZone in an equity deal, granting them with the ability to use the RedZone trademark and branding for other products. The deal was finalized in January of the following year. In September of 2026, RedZone at the U.S. Open served as the first usage of the RedZone trademark for their own products under this deal.

== Format ==
On game day, the RedZone channel signs-on at 12:45 p.m., US Eastern time. The countdown clock counts down the minutes and seconds until the start of the game coverage. As of December 6, 2020, the channel has featured 200 weeks of coverage since its debut.

=== Whip around coverage ===
At 1:00 p.m. (Eastern) the RedZone program begins, and immediately dives into live look-ins across the league. Host Scott Hanson gives a brief introduction of the day, highlighting key developing stories, as teams are typically already lining up for opening kickoff. Coverage of the opening kickoffs and a cursory look at early drives that are being established are the initial focus. Coverage is normally shown in full-screen, with one particular game as the primary focus for the moment.

The coverage is a direct simulcast of the CBS or Fox broadcast feed and commentary, with only occasional and usually brief voice-over comments by Hanson as needed. Coverage sometimes switches to split-screen, with two, three, four ("quad-box"), five ("Penta-box"), eight ("Octo-box"), or as many as ten ("Deca-box") game feeds being shown simultaneously. Producers in the studio monitor all game feeds in-progress, and decide which game to feature at any given moment. In an extremely rare circumstance, NFL RedZone may also include coverage of the late moments of an early international game airing on NFL Network, which occurred on October 11, 2026.

Whenever a team enters the red zone, the coverage will switch to a full-screen live look-in of that game's television broadcast. It will attempt to cover a potential scoring result (touchdown or field goal). Meanwhile, the other games continue to be monitored, in case the need arises to switch to another feed at short notice. Field goal attempts from outside the red zone are sometimes shown, either live or in replay, if they pose significance to the outcome of the respective game.

As the games enter halftime, the coverage shifts over to games still finishing up the second quarter, even if there are no teams in the red zone. Some noncompetitive games that would otherwise not be looked at may take the attention for a few minutes, in order to fill the broadcast with as much live football coverage as possible. As soon as better games start returning for the third quarter, second half kickoffs typically take a priority.

If there are no teams in the red zone at a given moment, the focus may shift to a team on a strong offensive drive, or an otherwise important game of the day. Despite the channel's moniker, a team does not have to be inside the red zone for the focus and coverage to shift to that game. During the latter portion of the season, extra sidebar attention may be given to teams fighting for playoff berths, and the respective status thereof. The "whip around" coverage also is used to show quick replays of major plays such as turnovers, deep pass completions, very long runs from scrimmage, kickoff/punt return touchdowns, and other potentially interesting or important key plays. The "Game Rewind" feature is sometimes used to replay a significant play that resulted in a particular team entering the red zone.

Hanson rarely takes any kind of rest break during RedZone's seven hours on the air, and since the early years of the channel he has purposefully planned out his eating and drinking schedule during the regular season to avoid any need for a restroom break, having boasted on Twitter on December 10, 2017 (that year's Week 14) about his first restroom break in four years of NFL RedZone coverage.

It is not unusual for RedZone to switch between two or more games in quick succession, even between individual plays. Despite an effort made by producers to air all touchdowns live, some scoring plays are actually aired after a very brief time shift – ranging from as much as 30 to 60 seconds – sometimes because another scoring play is unfolding elsewhere. Time shifting can also occur if the scoring play happened unexpectedly, and/or initiated from outside the red zone. In those cases, the coverage is aired plausibly live with no mention that the coverage is slightly behind real time (though Hanson often tries to introduce the switch with some kind of segue, such as 'while we were watching that (play)...' to note it isn't live video).

When the 1 p.m. "early" games are in the fourth quarter, the focus of attention begins to narrow down to one-possession games (games within 8 points); Hanson will additionally introduce the fourth quarter coverage as "The Witching Hour; where wins become losses, and losses become wins". As the "early" games begin to conclude, RedZone seamlessly leads into coverage of the 4:05/4:25 p.m. "late" games. On afternoons in which early game action ends sooner than expected, extended statistical rundowns, highlights, and coverage of team press conferences may be used to fill the time before the late games start. Early games which go into overtime are usually prioritized, but never at the expense of missing touchdowns in other games that just started. When each game is concluded, a final score alert will flash on the bottom corner of the screen to inform viewers. This is especially important for games that have not had a live look-in for many minutes.

Periodically throughout the afternoon, producers keep track of and update viewers on the status of fantasy football statistics, and/or other statistical superlatives. With the legalization of sports betting in several states beginning in 2020, it also points out the over–under and certain betting statistics provided by league partner Caesars Sportsbook. The channel's priority, however, is to show every touchdown scored in every game throughout the afternoon. During the entire day, RedZone features a ticker at the bottom of the screen, updating scores and stats throughout the league. The ticker is situated in such a way that it is superimposed over the respective tickers of CBS and FOX.

On occasion, technical difficulties could prevent RedZone from showing certain touchdowns live. During Week 1 in the 2019 season, a technical issue with the CBS broadcast prevented a live look at a touchdown in the Kansas City Chiefs-Jacksonville Jaguars game; the touchdown was later shown using video from the scoreboard at TIAA Bank Field. Similar issues during Week 2 in 2020 prevented two touchdowns in the Buffalo Bills-Miami Dolphins game from being broadcast live; both touchdowns were later aired on replay (with one aired from the Dolphins' Instagram feed).

=== Limited-commercial format ===
RedZone operates as a limited-commercial service; as such, whenever a game taking primary focus goes to a broadcaster-designated commercial break or other stoppage (such as timeout, instant replay challenge or an injury timeout), the feed will immediately switch to the next most-interesting game in-progress at the moment.

Commercial breaks are not completely avoided however, as sometimes the network coverage may take a break faster than expected, causing the first second or two of a commercial to air, before RedZone quickly cuts to another game, which usually includes Hanson jokingly playing off the brush with the accompanying commercial break with some kind of snark. Additionally, broadcast network promotions of their programming (most notably CBS and Fox promoting their Sunday night primetime lineups) will be shown as a natural part of the coverage.

If all games being held at a given moment are on a commercial break or in halftime, coverage will revert to the studio for brief commentary, replays, or statistical analysis by Hanson. In the "late" timeslot (when there are fewer games to choose from), highlight packages of selected "early" games may be shown during down times.

In recent years, the RedZone broadcast has had a presenting sponsor (such as Amazon Prime Video. and later DraftKings) along with other sponsored segments around statistics and superlatives, but had not broadcast its own commercial breaks. On December 15, 2024, RedZone began to quietly "test" a limited number of commercial breaks, airing in a split screen "double-box" alongside live gameplay. This elicited criticism from viewers, especially due to host Scott Hanson's still using his traditional sign-on promising "seven hours of commercial-free football". The NFL responded to the criticism, stating that this was a "test" and there as of yet were no long-term plans to add commercials to RedZone. The limited commercial breaks returned the following week, with Hanson notably amending his sign-on to no longer mention that the broadcast was commercial-free.

During an appearance on The Pat McAfee Show, Hanson confirmed RedZone will incorporate commercial breaks starting with the 2025 NFL season, marking the end of its longstanding commercial‑free format, which further elicited criticism from viewers. Later clarification made clear that they would be limited in the first few weeks, with only four fifteen-second ads throughout each edition as part of a double-box graphic with game action remaining on the screen over the ad's audio, and not during actual red zone action. RedZone added additional advertisements as the season progressed. An analysis by Sports Business Journal of the November 30, 2025 broadcast indicated that RedZone ran a total of nine commercials in "double-box" during the program.

=== Touchdown montage and sign-off ===
As the 4:05/4:25 p.m. "late" games begin to arrive at their conclusions, coverage will narrow down to the remaining games still ongoing. When the moment arrives at which there is only one game left being played, coverage will change depending on whether viewers are in the United States or outside the country. For those in the United States, they will be instructed by the host that they will need to switch to the applicable network to watch that game to its conclusion. This rule applies even in the rare event that the only game remaining is a regional broadcast (4:05 p.m. start) on the non-doubleheader network (and thus still be on the out-of-market NFL Sunday Ticket package), which has on at least one occasion led to the host unintentionally providing misleading information about that game's availability. International viewers are instead switched directly to the remaining game's network feed to its conclusion, irrespective of its competitiveness.

At the conclusion of the coverage, an edited montage of every touchdown scored throughout the afternoon is aired. Until 2018, due to contractual obligations, RedZone was required to sign off no later than 8:00 p.m., even if a late afternoon game(s) was still in progress; this was due to avoid a conflict with NBC's Sunday night game broadcast. This was rectified in the 2019 season, such that any game that ends after 8:00 p.m. would continue airing on RedZone until its conclusion, provided that there is still more than 1 game in progress. If the RedZone signs-off with inadequate time for the touchdown montage (which can vary from 5–10 minutes in duration), it will be posted online instead. At the onset, the total number of touchdowns for the afternoon by type (offensive, defensive, and special teams) is listed on a graphic, with a running tally for the entire season also shown.

In some cases, when games are running close to the 8:00 p.m. deadline, the touchdown montage has been shown in a split-screen format. The montage is shown in a prominent square with audio, while the game still being played is shown in a lesser square in the corner of the screen without audio. This is done particularly when the game still being played is a nationally televised game – a situation in which most viewers in most markets across the country (per NFL television rules) could simply switch to CBS or FOX to watch the game to its conclusion.

=== Off-air periods ===
After the broadcast day ends (≈ 8:00 p.m.) RedZone remains dark until the following Sunday. During the week, as well as during playoffs and off-season, a generic title card advertisement is shown, accompanied by music from NFL Films. However, cable providers may overlay their own tie-in title card. Providers are disallowed from using the channel space for other purposes during its off-time.

While the RedZone channel is only utilized for Sunday 1:00 p.m. and 4:00 p.m. (Eastern) games, in the unique instance in which Christmas Day falls on a Sunday, and the full slate of Week 16 afternoon games is switched to Saturday, the RedZone channel is activated for that Saturday afternoon schedule.

RedZone is not on-air during Thursday night, Sunday night, Monday night, and any stand-alone Saturday night games, nor for NFL International Series games which are scheduled in an early Sunday morning timeslot before 1:00pm ET. It also does not cover Thanksgiving games or postseason games.

During the offseason breaks since the 2016 season, NFL Network has re-ran the previous season's RedZone presentations. During seventeen selected Sunday afternoons in the spring and early summer, all seventeen weeks of the regular season as seen on RedZone are re-aired, with editing for length and content and ad breaks inserted.

The 2019 re-run of the season was compressed in April 2020 to air throughout the month on consecutive days on a thrice-daily loop on the RedZone channel space, due to the coronavirus pandemic leaving the network wanting of content not involving live studio shows for the safety of their staff, as their facilities in California and the New York/New Jersey metropolitan area were closed due to stay-at-home orders and to allow NFL Network's traditional Draft run-up shows to air. Another rerun of seventeen consecutive days was done during what is usually the pre-season in late August, which was cancelled out in full, leaving the channel without its usual preview night in the last week of the pre-season.

=== Preseason ===
Through 2013, during select nights of the preseason, special "whip around" coverage aired on the primary NFL Network. It followed the same style as RedZone and utilized the same production team and host.

Starting in 2014, preseason "whip around" coverage moved to the RedZone channel itself. On four selected nights in August RedZone aired as part of a free preview of the service for all providers. Week 1 (Friday), and weeks 2–3 (Saturday) of the preseason featured the familiar "whip around" coverage. The broadcast utilized national and local team coverage feeds, as most preseason games are carried through regional sports networks or 'state/team networks' made up of local broadcast stations. Coverage started at 7:00 p.m. ET

In 2015, RedZone aired a free preview during the preseason for five selected nights, and during Week 1 of the regular season. In 2016, RedZone aired a free preview on four selected nights during the preseason starting August 11 and during Week 1 of the regular season. In 2017, RedZone aired only once during preseason.

=== Availability ===
The RedZone Channel is available on most American pay television providers carrying the NFL Network, and is presented in both standard and high definition; availability of the channel depends on the service tier. Some carriers might carry NFL Network available on their main digital tier, while RedZone might be relegated to a digital sports tier at an additional cost. Access to the network is available through the Watch NFL Network mobile app via a subscriber's TV Everywhere credentials if offered by their provider, or through a provider's own viewing app. Before the 2018 season, the app was one of the few exceptions where some form of access to NFL games is offered beyond Verizon Wireless subscribers due to that provider's mobile rights exclusivity (That season, Verizon-owned Yahoo Sports opened its live NFL streams to users from other mobile phone providers).

Including the 18 Sundays of the NFL regular season, and as many as five special broadcasts during the preseason, RedZone broadcasts a total of 18–22 days out of the year.

In the United Kingdom, NFL RedZone is broadcast in full on Sky Sports Mix.

Between 2014 and 2019, NFL RedZone aired in Australia on ESPN Australia.

In Canada, starting in 2020, NFL RedZone is included for subscribers of TSN through TSN.ca and the TSN Go mobile app. It is also included with TSN+. A French-language version is also available on RDS.ca and RDS Direct.

ESPN Latin America began to air NFL RedZone in 2016. It features two pairs of Spanish-language announcers, one for the early games and another for the late games.

In Spain, starting in 2021, NFL RedZone is broadcast in full on Deportes por Movistar Plus+.

=== Criticism ===
RedZone has generally received favorable to positive reviews, and its product has been referred to as a form of new media. Some complaints deal with viewers not seeing equal coverage of all games across the league, the inability to see outstanding defensive team performances (outside of defensive scores), and emphasis on individual players instead of teams. Games in the "early" time slot that become blowouts are sometimes completely ignored (except for very brief replays of touchdowns to maintain the promise of showing "every touchdown from every game", or merely to fill time when other games are in commercial) Likewise a scoreless, or very low scoring game, will not garner much attention either until the end of the game if still tied. Furthermore, many fans still prefer to watch complete games. Other complaints include middling games without playoff or draft positioning implications being nearly pushed off the channel in the last weeks of the season, with only cursory glances at highlights, fantasy stats, and scores for those match-ups.

One source of criticism stems from RedZone potentially drawing viewers away from the traditional broadcasts on CBS and Fox, and likewise devaluing the commercial values for advertisers. In the 2021 NFL season, when Fox had 100% national coverage for the two late games during Week 3, the network removed its own ticker and moved its scoreboard graphic during these games, causing its bottom half (which displayed the clock and yardage) to be cut off by RedZone's ticker. The decision was believed to be an attempt to encourage viewers to watch the game on their local Fox station instead. Initially, this prompted RedZone to overlay its own scoreboard graphic. In 2022, RedZone began to simply hide its ticker entirely when simulcasting Fox games with a lower scoreboard, and in Week 2 of the 2025 season (after CBS adopted a new scoreboard graphic with a lower position similar to Fox) RedZone began to simply scale the feeds for all games to fit above the ticker with stylized pillarboxing.

In December 2024, NFL RedZone, known for its "seven hours of commercial-free football," introduced split-screen advertisements during its Week 15 broadcast. This unexpected move prompted significant backlash from viewers, who valued the uninterrupted nature of the program. Host Scott Hanson, who had commenced the broadcast with the traditional "commercial-free" promise, later apologized for the oversight, acknowledging the error and emphasizing his commitment to accuracy and integrity. In response to the controversy, the NFL stated that the commercials were part of a test and that there were no immediate plans to continue airing ads during the remainder of the 2024 season. Subsequently, in Week 16, Hanson adjusted his opening line to "seven hours of RedZone football," omitting the "commercial-free" phrase, reflecting the potential for future advertising integrations, which became true beginning in the 2025 season, prompting more significant backlash from viewers.

=== Fire alarm incident ===
During Week 12 coverage in November 2023, a fire alarm went off at the Inglewood NFL Network studio, interrupting the live RedZone broadcast; Hanson and the production team were evacuated from the studio. The alarm turned out to be a false alarm, and the broadcast resumed. The alarm did not impact the Baltimore Ravens–Los Angeles Chargers game, which took place at SoFi Stadium, across the street from the studio.

== Similar channels ==
=== DirecTV Red Zone Channel ===
The NFL RedZone channel should not be confused with the former nearly identical Red Zone Channel, a service that was included as part of DirecTV's out-of-market sports package NFL Sunday Ticket, and was hosted by Andrew Siciliano.

Despite their similar names and formats, the two channels were independent from each other, and the DirecTV service launched ahead of the NFL Network-run RedZone. In December 2022, with the announcement that rights to NFL Sunday Ticket would move exclusively to YouTube, it was confirmed that the service will not produce its own equivalent, and would simply distribute RedZone. Its final broadcast was January 8, 2023.

=== ESPN Goal Line ===
ESPN Goal Line aired live look-ins of college football games in a similar format and style as NFL RedZone. Hosted by Matt Schick. Established in 2010, the channel ceased operations in 2020.

=== SiriusXM's The Sunday Drive ===
Apart from the RedZone channel, a similar service is aired parallel on Sirius XM NFL Radio, hosted by "Judge" Steve Torre and Bill Lekas. (Zach Gelb fills in when Torre is unavailable.) During the Sunday afternoon games, The Sunday Drive monitors all games in progress across the league. Any time a team enters the red zone, they will cut-in to the team's live local radio broadcast to cover potential scoring action. Until 2014 (when it was replaced by the studio show NFL GameDay Live), this audio was also carried on NFL Network during Sunday afternoon games, overlaid with textual scores and stats to avert any form of competition with the league's broadcast partners. In the past it featured more of a "carousel" type of format where reporters at each game would check in via telephone with the basic score, scoring plays and statistics, as most sports radio networks and stations that do not carry game play-by-play do.

=== Learfield's College Football Blitz ===
Similar to The Sunday Drive above, Learfield provides a whip-around radio service for college football that airs on SiriusXM's ESPNU Radio service and Learfield's The Varsity Network app (and was formerly streamed on TuneIn before The Varsity Network's launch), for schools that utilize Learfield to produce and distribute their broadcasts. Starting in 2015, College Football Blitz airs on Saturdays during college football season from noon to midnight Eastern time, and like The Sunday Drive, cuts into local team broadcasts for possible scoring action. The show is hosted by Stephen Hartzell, with Phil Brame and Adam Witten sometimes taking over for evening hours.

=== NBA CrunchTime ===
The NBA produces a whiparound show called NBA CrunchTime, available via the NBA App, featuring live look-ins of NBA games. The show has aired on NBA TV since the 2015–16 NBA season and started broadcasts on the NBA App in 2022. Airing on every Monday night from 8:30 PM to 1 AM Eastern time the following day (with special editions on other nights of the week as the NBA's national television schedule allows), NBA CrunchTime is hosted by Jared Greenberg and Channing Frye. To protect the broadcast rights of the various regional sports networks that air NBA games, each game is limited to five live lookins, and the show has restrictions on airing highlights from games between six and two minutes left in the 4th quarter.

=== March Madness Fast Break ===
During the NCAA Division I men's basketball tournament (March Madness), the NCAA provides whiparound coverage of the first weekend of games under the Fast Break banner, available via the March Madness Live internet streaming platform and mobile app. The show began airing in 2018 and provides live coverage via the NCAA March Madness television broadcasts, jointly aired by CBS and TNT Sports; originally confined to the first round of games, the broadcast expanded to cover the entire first weekend the next year.

=== MLB Big Inning ===
Major League Baseball produces MLB Big Inning, a whiparound program showing live look-ins of MLB games, every night during the MLB season starting at 9:30 PM Eastern time. Originally launched in 2021 exclusively to subscribers of MLB.tv, the program expanded to Apple TV+ subscribers in 2022 as part of the deal that also brought Friday Night Baseball to the streaming service. MLB Big Inning is also simulcast on MLB Network on select nights, albeit with limited commercial interruption.

The channel served as the de facto replacement for MLB Whiparound, a program with a similar format that aired on Fox Sports 1 from 2014 to 2020. Beginning in the 2026 season, Peacock is expected to begin streaming a whiparound show on Sunday afternoons.

=== National Hockey League ===
Whiparound shows in the National Hockey League are complicated by the league having separate national broadcasters in Canada and the United States (as of 2024, Sportsnet and Amazon Prime in Canada, ESPN and TNT Sports in the United States), with separate whiparound coverage being produced in both markets as a result. In March 2018, Sportsnet debuted a whiparound show named Ice Surfing to be broadcast via Twitter, the show continued to air through the 2019–20 NHL season. In 2024, as part of Sportsnet selling rights to Monday Night Hockey to Amazon Prime Video, the latter began airing NHL Coast to Coast on Thursday nights.

In 2023, ESPN announced that it would produce NHL Frozen Frenzy, a one-off whiparound show on October 24 of that year; the date was chosen because all 32 NHL teams would play that night. The show aired on ESPN2 and ESPN+. A second iteration of NHL Frozen Frenzy aired on October 22, 2024; a third iteration of NHL Frozen Frenzy aired on October 28, 2025 with a fourth scheduled for October 2026.

=== Soccer ===
Whiparound programs have also been produced for professional soccer leagues. NBC Sports launched Goal Rush in 2016, providing whiparound coverage of the English Premier League. The show began airing on the NBC Sports app and NBCSports.com, moving to Peacock when the service launched in 2020. In 2020, CBS Sports began airing The Golazo Show on CBS Sports Network and Paramount+ with coverage of the UEFA Champions League and Europa League matches. In 2023, with the launch of MLS Season Pass, the Apple TV+ platform launched MLS 360, presenting live whiparound coverage for Major League Soccer. ESPN also launched a Bundesliga whiparound in the US market in fall 2023. In England, BT Sport (now TNT Sports) has used whiparound content for the Champions League and Europa League and Conference League since 2015.

=== Olympics: Gold Zone ===
For the 2024 Summer Olympics in Paris, NBC produced Gold Zone, providing whiparound coverage of the Olympic events on Peacock. Hanson and Siciliano were announced as Gold Zone hosts, along with Matt Iseman and Jac Collinsworth. NBC would later announce that Gold Zone would return for the 2026 Winter Olympics in Milan-Cortina, along with Hanson returning as host.

=== RedZone at the U.S. Open ===
In August 2026 ESPN announced a new program, RedZone at the U.S. Open, which would feature whiparound coverage of matches during the early rounds of the 2026 US Open tennis tournament. Airing from August 30 to September 4 from 11 a.m. to 6 p.m. Eastern Time on the ESPN Unlimited streaming service, it is the first time that ESPN is utilizing the RedZone name for a sport other than football since completing its acquisition of the brand from the NFL.

== See also ==
- List of personalities on NFL Network
- NFL Sunday Ticket
