= Freeview =

Freeview may refer to:

- Freeview (Australia), the marketing name for the digital terrestrial television platform in Australia
- Freeview (New Zealand), a digital satellite and digital terrestrial television platform in New Zealand
- Freeview (UK), a digital terrestrial television platform in the United Kingdom
- Freeviewing is viewing a stereoscopic image with the eyes without using a viewer
- Free preview, the limited-term unencrypted distribution of a pay television service's programming to subscribers of a multichannel television provider
- Audience (TV network), a defunct American satellite television network exclusive to DirecTV subscribers that operated from 1999 to 2020; formerly known as "Freeview"
