= Francisco Fernández =

Francisco Fernández may refer to:

== Nobility ==
- Francisco Fernández de la Cueva, 2nd Duke of Alburquerque (1467–1526), Spanish noble
- Francisco Fernández de la Cueva, 4th Duke of Alburquerque (1510–1563), Spanish noble
- Francisco Fernández de la Cueva, 7th Duke of Alburquerque (1575–1637), Spanish noble
- Francisco Fernández de la Cueva, 8th Duke of Alburquerque (1619–1676), Spanish military officer and governor of New Spain
- Francisco Fernández de la Cueva, 10th Duke of Alburquerque (1666–1724), viceroy of New Spain

== Politics and law ==
- Francisco Fernández de Béthencourt (1850–1916), Spanish politician
- Francisco Fernández Ordóñez (1930–1992), Spanish politician
- Francisco Fernández Marugán (1946–2025), Spanish politician
- Francisco Fernández de Cevallos (born 1947), Mexican politician
- Francisco Javier Fernández (politician) (born 1969), Spanish politician
- Francisco Montealegre Fernández (1818–1875), Costa Rican politician and businessman
- Francisco Sanz Fernández (born 1952), Spanish politician

== Sports ==
- Gallego (footballer) (Francisco Fernández Rodríguez, born 1944), Spanish international footballer of the 1960s
- Francisco Fernández Ochoa (1950–2006), Spanish alpine skier
- Francisco Fernández Moreno (born 1954), Spanish road bicycle racer
- Francisco Fernández (Chilean footballer) (born 1975), Chilean association football player
- Paquillo Fernández (Francisco Javier Fernández, born 1977), Spanish racewalker
- Francisco Fernández (water polo) (born 1986), Spanish water polo player

== Others ==
- Francisco Fernández (artist) (1606–1646), Spanish painter
- Francisco Fernández Carvajal (1938–2026), Spanish priest and author
- Francisco Fernández (supercentenarian) (1901–2012), Spanish supercentenarian

== See also ==
- Francisco José Fernandes Costa (1867–1925), member of the Portuguese Republican Party
- Frank Fernández (disambiguation)
- Francisco Javier Fernández (disambiguation)
