= Israel Ledesma Magaña =

Mexican politician (1954–2014)

- Born: 16 May 1954; Irapuato, Guanajuato, Mexico
- Died: 27 November 2014 (aged 60)
- Occupation: Politician
- Political party: PRI

Israel Reyes Ledesma Magaña (16 May 1954 – 27 November 2014) was a Mexican politician from the Institutional Revolutionary Party (PRI).

From 2009 to 2012 he served in the Chamber of Deputies to represent the State of Mexico's 37th district during the 61st session of Congress.

He died on 27 November 2014 while serving as a local deputy in the Congress of the State of Mexico.
