= Darren Dreifort =

American baseball player (born 1972)

- Pitcher
- Born: May 3, 1972 (age 54); Wichita, Kansas, U.S.
- Batted: Right Threw: Right

MLB debut
- April 7, 1994, for the Los Angeles Dodgers

Last MLB appearance
- August 16, 2004, for the Los Angeles Dodgers

MLB statistics
- Win–loss record: 48–60
- Earned run average: 4.36
- Strikeouts: 802
- Stats at Baseball Reference

Teams
- Los Angeles Dodgers (1994, 1996–2001, 2003–2004)

Career highlights and awards
- Golden Spikes Award (1993)

Member of the College

Baseball Hall of Fame
- Induction: 2009

Darren James Dreifort (born May 3, 1972) is an American former Major League Baseball pitcher for the Los Angeles Dodgers.

== Early career ==
Dreifort played baseball in High School at Wichita Heights High School and was drafted out of High School by the New York Mets in 1990. He chose instead to attend college at Wichita State University. As a college ballplayer, Dreifort was a two-time consensus All-American and the 1993 NCAA Player of the Year. He was 26–5 with a 2.24 ERA in his career at WSU on the mound and was also a great power hitter at the plate. Darren was inducted into the Kansas Sports Hall of Fame for his performance there.

== Los Angeles Dodgers ==
He was subsequently drafted in the 1st round (2nd overall behind Alex Rodriguez) in the 1993 Major League Baseball draft by the Los Angeles Dodgers.

Dreifort became one of only a select few players to make his professional debut in the Majors, without first appearing in a minor league game. He made his debut on April 7, 1994, against the Florida Marlins, working one scoreless inning as a relief pitcher. He appeared in a total of 27 games for the Dodgers that season, finishing 0–5 with a 6.21 ERA.

After missing the 1995 season due to injuries, Dreifort returned to the Dodgers bullpen for the 1996 and 1997 seasons, pitching effectively as a late inning setup man. He recorded his first career win on August 30, 1996, in relief against the Philadelphia Phillies. In 1997 he was very good out of the pen, finishing 5–2 with a 2.86 ERA in 48 appearances and notched 4 saves.

He transitioned to the starting rotation for the 1998 season, making his first start on April 11 against the Houston Astros at Dodger Stadium, working five innings and taking the loss. He finished the season 8–12 with an ERA of 4.00. He continued to pitch effectively in 1999 (13-13) and in 2000 turned in his best season with a 12–9 record, 4.16 ERA in 32 starts and 164 strikeouts. On August 8, 2000, Dreifort became the first pitcher since Derek Lilliquist in 1990 to hit two home runs in a game.

A free agent after the 2000 season, Dreifort re-signed with the team, and received a five-year, $55 million contract in 2001, a large contract in spite of the fact that he had a career record of 39–45, and a history of arm trouble. But, in 2001, with a limited free-agent pitching market, Dreifort's agent Scott Boras sold the Dodgers on the right-hander's future potential, hinting he might sign with their National League West rival, the Colorado Rockies. The Dodgers responded with the big contract.

=== Injuries ===
Dreifort's health shut him down during the first season of the deal; he was finished in early July when he was forced to undergo elbow reconstruction surgery that kept him out until the end of 2002. With continuing arm and shoulder trouble, plus additional knee and hip trouble, Dreifort actually pitched in only three of the five years on the deal, also missing the entire 2005 season and parts of two other seasons during the life of the deal.

In 2004, after team medical personnel advised the Dodgers Dreifort could not pitch as a starter due to his injuries, Dreifort became the Dodgers' seventh inning reliever in front of setup man Guillermo Mota and closer Éric Gagné. Dreifort pitched inconsistently due to knee and hip troubles in addition to older arm and shoulder issues.

Dreifort's issues may be traceable to a degenerative condition that weakened his connective tissues, as well as a deformed femur that may have been the root of his hip problems, affecting in turn his ability to rotate his body properly, which could have affected his knees and his elbows as well. He is reported to have had 22 surgeries total, 20 of them since leaving college to play professional baseball.

Dreifort retired at age 32. He is married to former sports journalist Krystal Fernandez and lives in Pacific Palisades, California. He remains involved with baseball, working as a Dodgers minor league spring training instructor.

Dreifort was inducted into the College Baseball Hall of Fame in 2009.

== See also ==
- List of baseball players who went directly to Major League Baseball
- List of Major League Baseball single-inning strikeout leaders
