= José Carlos Fernández =

José Carlos Fernández may refer to:

- José Carlos Fernández (Bolivian footballer) (1971-), Bolivian football goalkeeper
- José Carlos Fernández (Peruvian footballer) (1983-), Peruvian footballer
- José Carlos Fernández Vázquez (1987-), Spanish footballer

See also

- Lito Vidigal (1969-), Angolan footballer, born José Carlos Fernandes Vidigal

== See also ==
- Carlos Fernandes (disambiguation)
- Carlos Fernández (disambiguation)
- José Fernández (disambiguation)
