= Carlos Fernandes =

Carlos Fernandes may refer to:

- Carlos Fernandes (activist) (1983–2024), Angolan activist
- Carlos Fernandes (footballer, born 1979), Carlos Alberto Fernandes, Portuguese-Angolan football goalkeeper
- Carlos Fernandes (footballer, born 1978), Carlos Miguel Brandão Fernandes, Portuguese football defender
- Carlos Fernandes (tennis) (born 1936), Brazilian tennis player of the 1950s and 1960s
- Carlos Nicholas Fernandes, Singaporean inventor, entrepreneur and public policy advisor

== See also ==
- Carlos Fernández (disambiguation)
- José Carlos Fernández (disambiguation)
