= Alex Fernandes =

Alex Fernandes may refer to:

- Alex Fernandes (footballer, born 1973), Brazilian football striker
- Alex Fernandes (footballer, born 2002), Brazilian football midfielder for Baltika Kaliningrad

== See also ==
- Alex Fernandez (disambiguation)
