= Rafael Fernandes =

Rafael Fernandes may refer to:

- Rafael Fernandes, Rio Grande do Norte, municipality in Brazil
- Rafael Fernandes (baseball) (born 1986), Brazilian baseball player
- Rafael Fernandes (footballer) (born 2002), Portuguese footballer

== See also ==
- Rafael Fernández (disambiguation)
