= NFL Network =

American sports-oriented pay television network

- Country: United States
- Broadcast area: United States; Canada; Latin America; Caribbean; Puerto Rico; Europe; Philippines
- Headquarters: Hollywood Park; Inglewood, California, U.S.

Programming
- Language: English
- Picture format: 1080i HDTV (downscaled to letterboxed 480i for the SDTV feed)

Ownership
- Owner: ESPN, LLC
- Sister channels: ABC; ESPN; ESPN2; ESPN DTC; ESPN+ ESPNews; ESPNU; ESPN Deportes; ACC Network; SEC Network; NFL RedZone

History
- Launched: November 4, 2003; 22 years ago

Links
- Website: nfl.com/network

Availability

Streaming media
- Service(s): DirecTV Stream, FuboTV, Hulu + Live TV, Sling TV, YouTube TV

NFL Network (NFLN) is an American sports-oriented cable television network owned and operated by ESPN, LLC. Dedicated to American football, and in particular the National Football League, the channel features news and analysis programs, specials, and documentaries related to the league. NFL Network carries rebroadcasts of recent and classic NFL games, as well as a package of live games exclusive to the channel.

The network is headquartered in the NFL Los Angeles building located next to SoFi Stadium in Inglewood, California, and broadcasts its worldwide feed from Encompass Digital Media (formerly Crawford Communications, and Broadcast Facilities Inc.) in Atlanta, Georgia. It has secondary East Coast facilities in the NFL Films building in Mount Laurel, New Jersey.

NFL Network was originally established by the NFL as part of its NFL Media division. In August 2025, the NFL announced an agreement to sell NFL Network and certain other league properties (including distribution rights to the NFL RedZone service, and rights to the "RedZone" brand) to ESPN for an undisclosed amount, with the NFL taking a 10% equity stake in ESPN as part of the agreement. The acquisition was completed in February 2026, and ESPN began to integrate NFLN into its own NFL coverage later that year.

As of June 2023, NFL Network was available in 51.5 million television households in the United States, which was down from approximately 71.1 million households as of February 2015, as cord cutting continues to affect the industry.

== History ==
NFL Network was launched on November 4, 2003, only eight months after the owners of the league's 32 teams voted unanimously to approve its formation. Originally located in the Los Angeles suburb of Culver City, California, the league invested $100 million to fund the network's operations. NFL Films, which produces commercials, television programs, and feature films for the NFL, is a key supplier of NFL Network's programming, with more than 4,000 hours of footage available in its library. As a result, much of the network's highlights and recaps feature NFL Films' trademark style of slow-motion game action, sounds of the game, and sideline conversations between players and team staff. Both the network's site and app, were launched in 2004 (on NFL.com) and 2009, respectively.

Beginning with the 2006 season, the network began to broadcast eight regular-season NFL games during Thursday prime time, branded as Thursday Night Football. In addition to live games, the network has provided coverage of the NFL draft since 2006; its coverage competes with that provided by ESPN and ESPN2. It was simulcast in a co-production with Fox Sports for the 2018 edition, though this was only a one-year agreement as exclusive over-the-air broadcast rights moved to ABC for the 2019 edition, which saw ESPN produce a different broadcast for 'casual' fans. In 2020, the network simulcast ESPN's coverage of that year's draft which was produced remotely from the basement of commissioner Roger Goodell’s home due to the COVID-19 pandemic.

On September 8, 2021, the network moved with the rest of NFL Media to a 200,000-square-foot (19,000 m^{2}) space on the campus of Hollywood Park, a development that also features SoFi Stadium in Inglewood, California. In addition to office and studio space, the facility also features NFL Media's first outdoor studio and space to host studio audiences.

=== Acquisition by ESPN ===
On August 5, 2025, the NFL announced an agreement with ESPN, Inc. to acquire NFL Media, including NFL Network, RedZone, and NFL Fantasy for an undisclosed amount, pending regulatory approval. Under the deal, the NFL would acquire a 10% equity stake in ESPN, and NFL Network and RedZone would be included in the forthcoming ESPN over-the-top streaming service. Disney projected that the sale would be completed by late-2026 as a "best case" scenario.

On January 31, 2026, government regulators approved the deal, with the agreement closing shortly thereafter. and NFL Network employees officially becoming ESPN employees in April. At the time of the deal, the NFL Network was available in roughly 44 million homes. NFLN became available via the ESPN DTC service in July 2026.

The first on-air impact of the acquisition occurred in March 2026, when ESPN began to move selected United Football League games to NFL Network. In May 2026, the schedule announcement special for the 2026 season was a SportsCenter special simulcast with ESPN, rather than an NFL Network-produced broadcast as it was in the past. In an interview on The Dan Patrick Show following the schedule release, NFL Network personality Rich Eisen stated that he didn't know if this was an indication that ESPN planned to cut NFL Network studio programs that competed directly with its own, but that he had received assurances that programming such as NFL GameDay Morning (which competes with ESPN's Sunday NFL Countdown) and coverage of events such as the NFL Draft and Draft Combine would be unaffected by the merger. Upon the start of the 2026 season, ESPN cut the edition of NFL GameDay prior to Monday Night Football, replacing it with a simulcast of Monday Night Countdown.

== Programming ==
=== NFL game telecasts ===
NFL Network introduced original game broadcasts in the 2006 season via the Run to the Playoffs—a late-season package of Thursday- and Saturday-night games, branded as Thursday Night Football and Saturday Night Football respectively. After most Saturday games were dropped from the package beginning in the 2008 season, all of the games were branded as Thursday Night Football regardless of night beginning in 2009. Starting with the 2012 season, Thursday Night Football expanded to include a weekly game from Weeks 2 through 15 (excluding the Kickoff Game and Thanksgiving Day, which is held by NBC), as well as one Saturday night game during Week 16. As a result, every NFL team now appears in at least one timeslot-exclusive nationally televised game per-season.

As with the games broadcast by ESPN's Monday Night Football, the NFL Network telecasts are also aired on a designated broadcast television station in the primary markets of the participating teams, although prior to the suspension of blackout rules in 2015 stations in the home team's market only carried it if the televised game sold out all remaining available tickets 72 hours prior to the game's start time.

When Thursday Night Football premiered, veteran television announcer Bryant Gumbel served as play-by-play announcer, with former Fox and current NBC analyst Cris Collinsworth serving as color commentator for the broadcasts. Collinsworth won the Sports Emmy for best game analyst for his work on the NFL Network telecasts. Dick Vermeil replaced Collinsworth for two games in 2006; Marshall Faulk and Deion Sanders replaced Collinsworth when needed in 2007.

In the 2014 NFL season, the NFL established a sub-licensing agreement with CBS to increase the prominence of the Thursday Night Football package, under which a portion of the package would air in simulcast on broadcast television, and CBS Sports would produce all games. Specific games would still be exclusive to NFL Network to comply with carriage agreements guaranteeing a minimum number of exclusive NFL broadcasts per-season. In 2016, NBC Sports also gained a portion of the package under a similar arrangement. Fox Sports took over the package from 2018 to 2022. With Amazon Prime Video taking over exclusive rights to Thursday Night Football beginning in the 2022 season, NFL Network switched to a package consisting primarily of Sunday morning NFL International Series games, and late-season Saturday games.

Under ESPN ownership, NFL Network's package for the 2026 season will continue to feature five international games and a Week 16 doubleheader. In addition to these games, ESPN announced in October 2026 that NFL Network would carry its statistics and analytics-oriented MNF Playbook altcasts of multiple Monday Night Football games through the remainder of the season, including Super Bowl LXI (marking NFL Network's first-ever broadcast of a live Super Bowl).

==== Preseason coverage ====
NFL Network televises all 65 preseason games each August. Some of the games air live on the network; however, a majority of these contests air on a tape-delayed basis and use the local broadcast of one of the teams involved. Live preseason game broadcasts on NFL Network are blacked out in the home markets of both participating teams, where the game is broadcast on a local station; in those affected areas, an alternate feed of NFL Network is shown instead with a different preseason game, documentary programming, or a previously aired game.

Prior to 2014, NFL Network occasionally broadcast selected preseason games as special editions of Thursday Night Football, such as the Pro Football Hall of Fame Game between the Pittsburgh Steelers and the New Orleans Saints in 2007 (NBC had opted out to carry the proposed China Bowl preseason game in Beijing, which was eventually cancelled).

=== Studio shows ===
On weekdays, Saturdays and Sundays during the off-season, Good Morning Football/Good Morning Football Weekend airs live from 8-10 am ET, followed by a repeat from 10 am-12 pm ET.

On Sundays during the NFL season, the NFL GameDay Morning pre-game show airs from 9 am-1 pm ET (if the network is not airing a 9:30 am ET international game, otherwise it will begin two hours prior to the start of the game), NFL GameDay Live from 1-7:30 pm ET (or when the 9:30 am ET game concludes when it is airing a game), NFL GameDay Highlights from 7:30-8:30 ET, NFL GameDay Prime from 8:30 pm–11:30 pm ET and NFL GameDay Final from 11:30 pm–12:30 am ET.

On Thursdays, Mondays and anytime NFL Network airs a game, NFL GameDay Kickoff begins two hours prior to the game, with NFL GameDay Live airing during the game (for Thursdays and Mondays), or Live Game coverage (if it's airing the game), with NFL GameDay Final airing after the game.

=== Other football ===
==== Arena Football League ====
NFL Network held the broadcast rights to the revived Arena Football League from 2010 to 2012. Starting with the 2010 season, the network broadcast a weekly Friday Night Football game each week during the regular season and playoff games at 8:00 p.m. Eastern Time from March to August, in addition to rights to playoff games and the ArenaBowl. The NFL stated that unlike when the NFL last showed interest in arena football, there would be no attempts to buy into the league. Broadcasters for the games included Kurt Warner, Tom Waddle, Paul Burmeister, Fran Charles, Charles Davis and Ari Wolfe.

NFL Network ceased airing Arena Football League games partway through the 2012 season as a result of ongoing labor problems within the league. The season's remaining games were carried on a tape delay before the network terminated the league broadcast contract outright at the end of the season; the rights were then obtained by CBS Sports Network.

In March 2024, the NFL announced they would broadcast 30 regular season games from the 2024 revival of the AFL on NFL Network. The league never carried any games, with West Texas Desert Hawks owner Zack Bugg accusing the network of malfeasance after he personally paid for one of his team's games to be televised only for the network never to carry it and claim they never received the money. Another league member, the Albany Firebirds, indicated that the network had refused to carry the games because the league had a number of small-market teams (including West Texas) that "scared (them) off." Oregon Blackbears president Patrick Johnson was among the league's franchisees who was against the NFL Network deal, noting the predatory structure required the league to pay the network a brokerage fee but did not allow the league to sell advertising nor share in any advertising sales the network sold.

==== College football ====
In 2006, NFL Network began a foray into televising college football bowl games, acquiring rights to the newly established Texas Bowl in Houston (whose management rights were held by the Houston Texans at the time), the Insight Bowl, as well as two all-star events—the Senior Bowl (which features prospects that had completed their college eligibility) and the Las Vegas All-American Classic (which, however, was cancelled at the last minute due to financial and sponsorship issues). These games were intended to help make NFL Network more attractive to television providers. The 2006 Insight Bowl, played between Minnesota and Texas Tech, would also achieve notoriety for featuring the largest comeback victory in Division I FBS bowl game history, with Texas Tech coming back from a 38–7 third-quarter deficit to win 44–41 in overtime.

On April 14, 2007, the network televised the Nebraska Cornhuskers' spring football game. The network again aired the Insight, Texas and Senior bowls in late 2007 and early 2008. In addition, it carried two games between historically black colleges and universities during the 2007 season, including the Circle City Classic at the RCA Dome in Indianapolis, Indiana. Rights to the Insight and Texas Bowls were later acquired by ESPN (with the former later moving to Fox Sports).

In May 2019, NFL Network announced a four-year deal with Conference USA to air a weekly regular-season game on Saturday afternoons beginning in the 2019 season. NFL Network opted out of the agreement after one season.

Since 2019, NFL Network has annually carried the Black College Football Hall of Fame Classic, a college football kickoff game that features a matchup of two historically black colleges and universities (HBCUs) on the Sunday before Labor Day. The HBCU Legacy Bowl, a postseason all-star game involving draft-eligible HBCU players, also has broadcast rights held by NFL Network.

In the 2022 season, NFL Network returned to carrying regular college football games through a weekly sub-license agreement with ESPN, drawn primarily from games from mid-major conferences such as the Sun Belt Conference.

==== High school football ====
NFL Network aired two high school all-star games in June 2007: the Bayou Bowl between players from Texas and Louisiana on June 9 (via a live feed from regional sports network FSN Southwest), and the Big 33 Football Classic between players from Pennsylvania and Ohio on June 16 (sharing its feed with CN8 (now the Comcast Network) and cable outlets in Pittsburgh, Pennsylvania and Ohio).

For the 2023 off-season, the NFL Network broadcast delayed games from the 7-on-7 Overtime's football league (OT7). In 2024 the network had live coverage of OT7's five-week regular season.

==== Canadian Football League ====
On July 1, 2010, NFL Network began airing live Canadian Football League games simulcast from Canadian sports network TSN. NFL Network aired the league's Thursday games, three Saturday games during the month of July, and then Friday night games beginning in September (after ArenaBowl XXIII). NFL Network did not air CFL games during August as it carried a heavy amount of NFL preseason game broadcasts. In addition, NFL Network did not carry any playoff games, including the Grey Cup championship, as those games are all played on Sundays opposite NFL regular season games. Those games were instead broadcast on the ESPN3 online service (ESPN owns a 20% interest in TSN, in a joint venture with majority parent Bell Media). On May 25, 2012, NFL Network announced it would not renew its contract with the CFL. The package was subsequently acquired by the NBC Sports Network, then by the ESPN networks.

NFL Network expressed interest in picking up CFL games again beginning in the 2019 season after its previous deal with ESPN expired. To accommodate this, the NFL insisted that the CFL move its schedule over a month earlier than it currently runs, so that the network can use the league to fill air time between the NFL draft and training camp. As such a change would require a rework of the league's collective bargaining agreement, it was unable to fulfill that request and instead renewed its agreement with ESPN.

==== Alliance of American Football ====
On January 31, 2019, NFL Network signed a multi-year deal to air Alliance of American Football games, broadcasting two games per week, most of them on Saturday and Sunday nights. As with all other AAF games, the broadcasts were produced in conjunction with CBS Sports. The league ultimately folded in the middle of its inaugural season.

==== United Football League ====
On March 17, 2026, the United Football League announced that selected ESPN-produced games in its 2026 season would air on NFL Network, beginning with the Birmingham Stallions at the Houston Gamblers on April 5, 2026.

== High definition ==
NFL Network HD is a 1080i high definition simulcast feed of NFL Network that launched in August 2004. It is available nationally on satellite providers DirecTV and Dish Network, and regionally on Verizon FiOS, AT&T U-verse and most Comcast and Cogeco Cable systems.

In mid-October 2008, in-studio programs began to air in "enhanced HD", featuring contained additional scores and statistics on a dedicated wing on the right side of the screen that was only visible on the HD feed. Content that is presented in 4:3 standard definition is shown with stylized pillarboxes, or for some footage, blurred pillarbox wings. On May 1, 2009, NFL Total Access began airing in full HD without pillarboxing or enhanced graphics; this was followed by the upgrade of NFL GameDay to HD the following September.

Most providers began to exclusively carry the HD feed of the network during 2011, transmitting a downscaled and letterboxed version of the HD feed to provide the channel in 4:3 standard definition for analog viewers without any deviation, including the "NFL HD" logo. The standard definition feed was discontinued entirely in July 2012, concurrent with the introduction of the network's current logo.

== NFL RedZone channel ==
The NFL RedZone channel is a special game-day only channel that broadcasts on Sundays during the regular season from 1:00 to 8:00 p.m. Eastern Time (10:00 a.m. to 5:00 p.m. Pacific Time). RedZone provides "whip around" coverage of all Sunday afternoon games airing in-progress on CBS and Fox. Whenever a team enters the red zone, the coverage will switch full-screen over to the live feed of that game's television broadcast, and attempt to cover a potential scoring result (touchdown or field goal). The coverage is hosted by Scott Hanson. This is not to be confused with the former DirecTV-exclusive channel which was a part of NFL Sunday Ticket until the end of the 2022 season.

Starting in 2016, NFL Network during the offseason replayed one week of NFL RedZone every Sunday from the previous season.

== International distribution ==
=== Canada ===
NFL Network was approved for distribution on Canadian television providers by the CRTC in 2004; any NFL Network-exclusive live games are blacked out on the feed distributed in Canada, as those games are aired on Bell Media's networks, including TSN and CTV/CTV 2.

NFL Network is also offered as part of DAZN's NFL Game Pass service as of 2017.

=== United Kingdom ===
It was reported that the network would be made available in the United Kingdom in 2008. However, this did not come to pass although significant elements of NFL Network programming is now seen in the UK on Sky Sports. Almost every edition of Good Morning Football and NFL Total Access are broadcast by Sky Sports NFL, which Sky has operated throughout the NFL season since 2020, and NFL Red Zone airs in the UK in its entirety on Sky Sports Mix.

=== Germany ===
Since the 2017 season, NFL Network is a part of the IPTV subscription service DAZN, which also offers NFL RedZone to German viewers.

=== Brazil ===
NFL Network is available on NFL GamePass Free Tier. NFL RedZone is available on the Pro Tier.

== Carriage and distribution complications ==
The launch of the Thursday Night Football package led NFL Network to increasingly insist on carriage on lower subscription tiers of television providers; in particular, demanding carriage on a basic package and a carriage fee of $0.61 per subscriber. Time Warner Cable and other major cable providers wished to place it on a sports tier. Cable companies felt that a channel with such marginal interest, few live games, and filler programming, would be tough to sell outside of the football season. In February 2008, The Wall Street Journal reported that the NFL had been in discussion with Disney executives over the possibility of partnering with ESPN to bolster NFL Network; one analyst suggested the possibility of NFL Network being combined into its lesser-viewed, but better-carried ESPN Classic channel.

=== 2006 free preview ===
NFL Network offered a free preview from December 24 to 30, 2006 to Suddenlink Communications systems in West Texas, and to Time Warner Cable and Cablevision systems in the New York City area. The package included the Texas Bowl and Insight Bowl, but excluded that week's NFL game between the New York Giants and Washington Redskins (which was already scheduled to air on a local broadcast station under existing NFL policy). However, Time Warner Cable and Cablevision were only interested in showing the Texas Bowl, which featured the Rutgers Scarlet Knights, who developed strong local appeal in 2006 and barely missed a berth in the Bowl Championship Series. The NFL denied that request and would only offer the free preview if Cablevision or Time Warner Cable made the entire preview week available to customers.

TWC then offered to carry the free preview on a digital tier. Cablevision, however, continued to refuse to carry any NFL Network programming other than the Texas Bowl. It even announced that Cablevision would put it on channel 14 (normally occupied by a television listings channel that was used as an overflow feed for MSG Network and FSN New York) at 6:00 p.m. until the end of the network's postgame coverage. The NFL, however, stated that it would not accept that request.

On December 21, however, after New Jersey legislators threatened legal action, Cablevision changed its mind and indeed showed not only the game between Rutgers and Kansas State, but also the entire free preview schedule. Time Warner had made a similar announcement only hours earlier. Suddenlink agreed on December 22 to carry the entire free preview for their customers in West Texas. The free preview did not lead to long-term carriage deals, and the standoff continued between all three cable companies and the NFL Network.

=== 2007 Packers vs. Cowboys controversy ===
2007 saw fresh controversy about the NFL Network. That year, the network happened to hold the rights to some match-ups with major implications. The first came in late November when the one-loss Dallas Cowboys hosted the one-loss Green Bay Packers. Green Bay's Brett Favre was also having one of the best seasons of his career and would eventually lead the resurgent Packers to the NFC Championship Game. Most fans could not see the game because of carriage restrictions, more noticeable because it involved nationally respected teams in a highly anticipated match-up. This controversy would pale in comparison to the final game the NFL Network would broadcast that season.

=== 2007 Patriots vs. Giants controversy ===
In December 2007, U.S. Senator John Kerry of Massachusetts wrote a letter to NFL Commissioner Roger Goodell asking for the league to settle their differences in time for the New England Patriots-New York Giants game on December 29 that would be broadcast on Saturday Night Football. The game was the Patriots' record-sealing win that made them the first undefeated team through the regular season in 35 years. Kerry urged for a solution to be decided upon in time so that Americans could witness "a historic event". An agreement was worked out between the NFL and two of the league's television partners, NBC and CBS, to allow the NFL Network broadcast of the game to be simulcast on those networks, resulting in the first NFL simulcast since Super Bowl I and the first three-network simulcast in the history of the league.

In addition, New York City area MyNetworkTV owned-and-operated station WWOR-TV (channel 9), and Hearst Television-owned ABC affiliates WCVB-TV (channel 5) in Boston and WMUR-TV (channel 9) in Manchester, New Hampshire, expressed dissatisfaction over the CBS/NBC simulcast, stating it violated their agreements with the network. The stations had already been scheduled to air the game, as per NFL rules. Greg Aiello, an NFL spokesperson, stated that NBC and CBS would not have agreed to present the simulcast without clearing the game nationally, including the aforementioned markets. WWOR came to an agreement with the network and showed the game along with WNBC and WCBS-TV (channel 2) in the New York City market. WCVB also would still televise the game and stated that it was still working toward resolving issues with the NFL Network over additional coverage rights. The result of these arrangements was that viewers in the New York, Boston and New Hampshire areas could see the game on up to four networks. Also in addition, satellite provider Dish Network and radio companies Sirius XM Radio and Entercom, expressed dissatisfaction over the NBC/CBS simulcast.

RCN Corporation, the 12th-largest cable provider in the U.S., stated that the league's deal with CBS and NBC "devalues its contract with the league’s in-house service." Greg Aiello, an NFL spokesperson, said he was unaware of dissatisfaction among NFL Network affiliates over the simulcast and if any were seeking a rebate or other form of compensation because the game was being more widely distributed. If that were the case, he said, those discussions would “take place privately with our TV partners.”

=== Comcast ===
On November 10, 2006, Comcast announced it would add NFL Network on its digital tier in time for the debut of Thursday Night Football. On August 6, 2007, Comcast moved NFL Network from the digital tiers to the Sports Entertainment Package. This led to a court battle between NFL Network and Comcast, with the ruling in favor of Comcast; the NFL Network later appealed the ruling. Comcast sent NFL Network a cease-and-desist letter to stop encouraging subscribers to drop their Comcast service. Comcast's carriage agreement with the NFL Network ended in mid-2009. On February 26, 2008, a New York appellate court reversed course on a May 2007 judgment that allowed Comcast to move the network from its second-most distributed tier to the company's sports tier. At that time, a court date had not been set. Four judges at the New York State Supreme Court, Appellate Division, First Department, ruled the language "concerning additional programming package was ambiguous and that neither party has established that its interpretation of the relevant contracts is a matter of law." Comcast's deal with the NFL Network was set to expire on April 30, 2009. According to messages sent out to Comcast, Midco, and some Cable Systems customers with or without set-top boxes, NFL Network might be removed from some customers' channel lineups. The message said: "In spite of our efforts to continue carrying NFL Network/NFL Network HD, the NFL may terminate our rights. As a result these networks may be removed from lineups as soon as 5/1." On April 10, 2009, it was confirmed that Comcast would remove the channel on that date due to failing to reach a carriage agreement. However, on April 30, 2009, NFL Network announced that it would continue to be carried on Comcast in the interim while both sides tried to reach an agreement on a new contract. On July 30, 2009, NFL Network was made available to lower-tiered Comcast digital cable subscribers.

NFL Network later filed a discrimination case against Comcast with the Federal Communications Commission (FCC), claiming that since Comcast does not charge an extra fee for the sports channels it owns, Versus and Golf Channel, it considered Comcast's move to charge extra for NFL Network unfair. On October 10, 2008, the FCC ruled as follows:

In the Second Report and Order, the Commission emphasized that the statute “does not explicitly prohibit multichannel distributors from acquiring a financial interest or exclusive rights that are otherwise permissible,” and thus, that “multichannel distributors [may] negotiate for, but not insist upon such benefits in exchange for carriage on their systems.” The Commission stated, however, that “ultimatums, intimidation, conduct that amounts to exertion of pressure beyond good faith negotiations, or behavior that is tantamount to an unreasonable refusal to deal with a vendor who refuses to grant financial interests or exclusivity rights for carriage, should be considered examples of behavior that violates the prohibitions set forth in Section 616.” We find that the NFL has presented sufficient evidence to make a prima facie showing that Comcast indirectly and improperly demanded a financial interest in the NFL’s programming in exchange for carriage. We further find that the pleadings and documentation present several factual disputes as to whether Comcast’s retiring of the NFL Network is the result of Comcast’s failure to obtain a financial interest in the NFL’s programming. Accordingly, we direct an Administrative Law Judge to hold a hearing, issue a recommended decision on the facts underlying the financial interest claim and a recommended remedy, if necessary, and then return the matter to the Commission within 60 days.

==== Comcast trial ====
The trial before an administrative law judge (as ordered above) began on April 14, 2009. On April 17, 2009, Comcast chairman and CEO Brian Roberts testified that the provider was willing to move the channel from the Sports Entertainment Package to a lower-priced base package if the subscriber fee was reduced to 25¢ per month (at that time, NFL Network was charging 75¢ per month). He claimed that overall, Comcast saved $50 million a year in license fees by leaving the channel on its Sports Package, which in turn led to savings for its customers.

On April 30, 2009, NFL Network Total Access correspondent Lindsey Soto reported Comcast would continue to carry the network after its contract expired at midnight as negotiations proceeded. On May 19, 2009, the NFL and Comcast reached a ten-year agreement to place NFL Network on Comcast's Digital Classic package by August 1, 2009, for a monthly price between 45 and 50¢, instead of the 70¢ fee that the NFL originally requested. This deal led to speculation that other cable operators would end their holdouts and try to reach deals that would bring the network to a wider audience.

As of 3 January 2011, the NFL Network was available only on the Digital Preferred or Sports package on Comcast's Xfinity system in Atlanta, Georgia, and not on a Digital Classic package (which does not exist). This is contrary to the above-mentioned agreement between Comcast and the NFL.

=== Time Warner Cable ===
NFL Network was added to Time Warner Cable systems in western New York and the Mohawk Valley in 2005 following the company's acquisition of Adelphia Communications' assets, replacing Adelphia's regional sports network, Empire. It was NFL Network's first substantial clearance on an analog cable system.

On December 20, 2007, the NFL Network proposed to Time Warner Cable to enter into binding arbitration, which would have a neutral third party determine the price and tier for NFL Network on the provider's systems, based on fair market value of the service. The NFL Network noted that the process could take some time and offered to make the December 29, 2007 game between the then unbeaten New England Patriots and New York Giants immediately available to Time Warner Cable subscribers, upon “written agreement to participate in the arbitration process and to be bound by its result.” The network was willing to make the binding arbitration available to cable providers not carrying the NFL Network and for an extension of Comcast's current contract.

Time Warner Cable denied the binding arbitration proposal, saying "the operator has successfully reached agreements with hundreds of programming networks without the use of arbitration. We continue to believe that the best way to achieve results is to privately seek a resolution and not attempt to negotiate through the press or elected officials.” TWC stated that it would be willing to make the network available on its sports tier, as a premium service, or make the game available to its subscribers on a per-game basis, at a retail price set by the NFL, with 100% of attendant revenue going to the league. The network refused and stated:

In addition to more cable providers, NFL asked TWC to put NFL Network. The network said that it will file a lawsuit with Comcast instead. But Bright House Networks and Time Warner Cable will carry the NFL Network instead.

On September 21, 2012, the Associated Press reported that Time Warner Cable and Bright House Networks had reached an agreement to carry NFL Network. Within hours, both NFL Network and NFL RedZone began to be carried on many Time Warner Cable systems in time for that week's games, with full distribution across the company's systems planned to be completed by September 27, in time for the next Thursday Night Football game.

=== Cogeco ===
On November 10, 2006, Canadian cable provider Cogeco Cable announced that it had reached a carriage agreement with the NFL Network to carry the network on its "Sports & Information Tier". NFL Network had previously insisted that it would only allow cable providers to carry the network on basic tiers; Time Warner Cable stated it would only carry the network on a digital sports tier. This makes Cogeco the only major cable provider to reach an agreement with the NFL Network by placing it directly on a digital sports tier without any repercussions from the network. When it was announced that NFL Network would carry Run to the Playoffs on Cogeco but not on a digital basic tier, it was stated that Cogeco's Sports & Information Tier "has about 30% penetration across all Cogeco subscribers and 60% penetration among Cogeco digital-cable homes."

=== Insight Communications ===
In 2004, Insight Communications reached a carriage agreement with the NFL Network to carry the network on the provider's digital tier, in addition to carrying NFL Network On Demand and NFL Network HD. At first, Insight did not carry the "Run to the Playoffs" games due to the extra surcharge providers pay to carry the games. Insight did not show the first-ever game, between the Denver Broncos and the Kansas City Chiefs on November 23, 2006, but the game that aired the following week and future games were available due to a long-term agreement that was later reached. Following Insight's January 2012 acquisition by Time Warner Cable, TWC chose to let the carriage agreement for NFL Network and NFL RedZone expire on August 1, 2012, which resulted in the two channels being removed from Insight's systems in Ohio, Kentucky and Indiana, due to the long-running carriage impasse between the National Football League and Time Warner Cable. They were restored immediately upon Time Warner reaching a carriage agreement with the network two months later.

=== Dish Network ===
On February 20, 2008, Dish Network moved the NFL Network from its "America's Top 100" package to the "America's Top 200" package. Dish Network notified customers that the NFL Network was "moving out of Free Preview into America's Top 200 package" on February 20, 2008. The move cost NFL Network four million subscribers. On February 27, 2008, the NFL Network announced it would file suit against Dish Network for moving the network to "America's Top 200". The move stemmed from the NFL Network's decision to simulcast the 2007 New England Patriots-New York Giants game on CBS and NBC, in addition to the game being shown on the NFL Network. As of 3 March 2008, the NFL no longer encouraged customers to switch to Dish Network on the IWantMyNFL.com website; instead, the network only encouraged customers to switch to DirecTV, Verizon FiOS or AT&T U-verse if their provider does not carry the network or has placed the network on a higher-priced tier.

On January 15, 2009, New York State Supreme Court Judge Rich Lowe ruled in favor of NFL Network, claiming their 2006 agreement for carriage on America's Top 100 package was still valid and Dish Network violated it by moving it to the America's Top 200 package, but he did not order Dish Network to move the channel to the lower package immediately.

On April 10, 2009, it was announced that NFL Network and Dish Network had reached an out-of-court settlement to place the channel on the "Classic Silver 200" package.

On June 16, 2016, Dish entered a new dispute with the NFL Network when the contract to carry the network expired at 7 PM ET, which resulted in the removal of the NFL Network and NFL Red Zone from the Dish Lineup, which marked the first time in the history of the NFL Network that a carriage agreement contract to carry the NFL Network expired and a new agreement was not reached before the deadline in which resulted in the temporary removal of the network from a cable/satellite provider. As part of the new carriage agreement, Dish subsidiary Sling TV added both networks to its lineup on August 11, 2016, in time for the start of the 2016 NFL preseason schedule.

=== Charter Communications ===
Charter Communications became one of the first multiple system operators to provide NFL Network, in 2004. Initially the deal called for the network to be carried on Charter's digital-basic programming and included NFL HD and NFL On Demand. However, in December 2005, the network had pulled itself from Charter and filed a breach of contract suit against the provider in the New York Supreme Court over contract language regarding distribution. It was reported that NFL Network wanted a 125% rate increase in carriage fees and placement on Charter's expanded basic tiers.

In August 2011, Charter Communications and NFL Network announced that the two parties had reached a new, long-term agreement to carry the NFL Network and RedZone in time for the 2011 season.

=== Suddenlink ===
On August 20, 2010, the National Cable Television Cooperative reached an agreement, of which Suddenlink Communications is a member, to carry the NFL Network on the organization's participating providers. As a result, Suddenlink announced it would offer NFL Network and NFL RedZone and immediately began carrying the channels. Suddenlink expected that the network's rollout to all of its service areas would be completed by or before September 12, the first Sunday of the NFL's 2010 regular season.

=== AT&T U-verse ===
On April 15, 2019, AT&T U-verse removed the channel from the lineup along with NFL RedZone.

== Carriage disputes ==
=== Cablevision ===
The network refused to be carried on Cablevision in 2004, but that this dispute ended in 2006, when the network was added to Cablevision.

=== Xfinity ===
From May 1, 2026 to August 11, 2026, Xfinity pulled NFL Network because of a dispute with the Walt Disney Company which now owns the NFL Network.

== See also ==
- List of personalities on NFL Network
- List of NFL draft broadcasters
- NFL Sunday Ticket
