= Mario Fernández =

Mario Fernández or Fernandez may refer to:

- Mario Fernandez (boxer) (born 1993), Filipino boxer
- Mario Fernández Alcocer (born 1979), Colombian politician
- Mario Fernández Baeza (born 1947), Chilean politician
- Mario Fernández Pelaz (1943–2024), Spanish lawyer and politician
- Mario Fernández Ruyales (born 1984), Spanish footballer
- Mario Fernández (field hockey) (born 1992), Spanish field hockey player
- Mario Fernández (footballer, born 1922)
- Mario Fernández (footballer, born 1988)
