= Scott Hanson =

American television anchor and reporter (born 1971)

- Born: Scott Richard Hanson; June 24, 1971 (age 55); Rochester, Michigan, U.S.
- Education: Syracuse University
- Occupations: Sports anchor and reporter
- Years active: 1993–present
- Employer(s): NFL Network (2006–present); Comcast SportsNet (2000–2006)
- Known for: NFL RedZone

Scott Richard Hanson (born June 24, 1971) is an American television anchor and reporter for NFL Network. He has served as sports reporter and anchor for several regional stations and was hired by NFL Network in 2006. He is currently the host of the NFL RedZone channel.

== Early life and education ==
Hanson was born and raised in Rochester, Michigan. He graduated from the Bishop Foley Catholic High School in Madison Heights, Michigan in 1989. In high school, Hanson was the team captain of the football team and earned all-conference honors.

Hanson attended Syracuse University' S.I. Newhouse School of Public Communications and graduated cum laude in 1993.

== Football career ==
Hanson played as a walk-on on the Syracuse Orange football team and played four seasons, two under head coach Dick MacPherson and two under Paul Pasqualoni. He played as a long snapper, wide receiver and defensive back on the scout team, and was a teammate of future Pro Football Hall of Famer Marvin Harrison. He was Scout Team Player of the Year in 1992.

== Professional career ==
While attending Syracuse, Hanson worked as a summer intern at WXYZ-TV in Southfield, Michigan.

In 1993, Hanson landed his first job as an anchor and reporter for NBC affiliate WPBN-TV in Traverse City, Michigan. He then moved to Springfield, Illinois, in 1994, sticking with NBC to be a reporter for WICS-TV. Next, Hanson headed south to ABC affiliate WFTS-TV in Tampa, Florida, where he covered the Tampa Bay Buccaneers rise under coach Tony Dungy.

Hanson then did a two-year stint in 2000 with Comcast SportsNet Philadelphia, where he served as an anchor on SportsNite as well as intermission reporter for the Philadelphia Flyers. In 2002, Hanson moved to sister network Comcast SportsNet Mid-Atlantic in Bethesda, Maryland, where he served as a main anchor and reporter. There, Hanson was reunited with his former WFTS-TV colleague Sage Steele, who joined CSN Mid-Atlantic a year earlier (2001).

In 2006, Hanson left CSN Mid-Atlantic to join the NFL Network, where he serves as a reporter, anchor, and host.

As of October 09, 2025, Hanson is a National Correspondent and host of NFL Network's show, NFL RedZone, which he debuted in Fall of 2009. On Sundays, he presents NFL coverage live for seven straight hours from 1:00-8:00 PM EST with no commercial breaks. On Mondays, he hosts Up to the Minute looking at NFL games from the previous week along with a preview of the Monday Night Football matchup. In addition, Hanson also co-anchors NFL Total Access during the week.

In 2015, Hanson served as the blow-by-blow announcer for Spike TV's Premier Boxing Champions series.

Hanson has served as in-stadium host for 14 straight Super Bowls, usually serving when the broadcast cuts to commercial break.

For the 2024 Summer Olympics, Hanson hosted a Peacock exclusive whip-around simulcast called Gold Zone alongside Andrew Siciliano, Matt Iseman, and Akbar Gbajabiamila. The program provided 10 hours of coverage across all events during the games.

== Personal life ==
Hanson lives in Los Angeles, California. He grew up in a religious home but was a skeptic before he converted to Christianity. Hanson has gone on to mission trips from the Missionaries of Charity in Mauritania, Nairobi, and locally in Los Angeles.

In 2014, Hanson volunteered with Orphan Outreach in Russia for a week and a half during the NFL off-season.
