= 37th federal electoral district of the State of Mexico =

Federal electoral district of Mexico

State of Mexico's 37th
- Electoral district of the Chamber of Deputies of Mexico

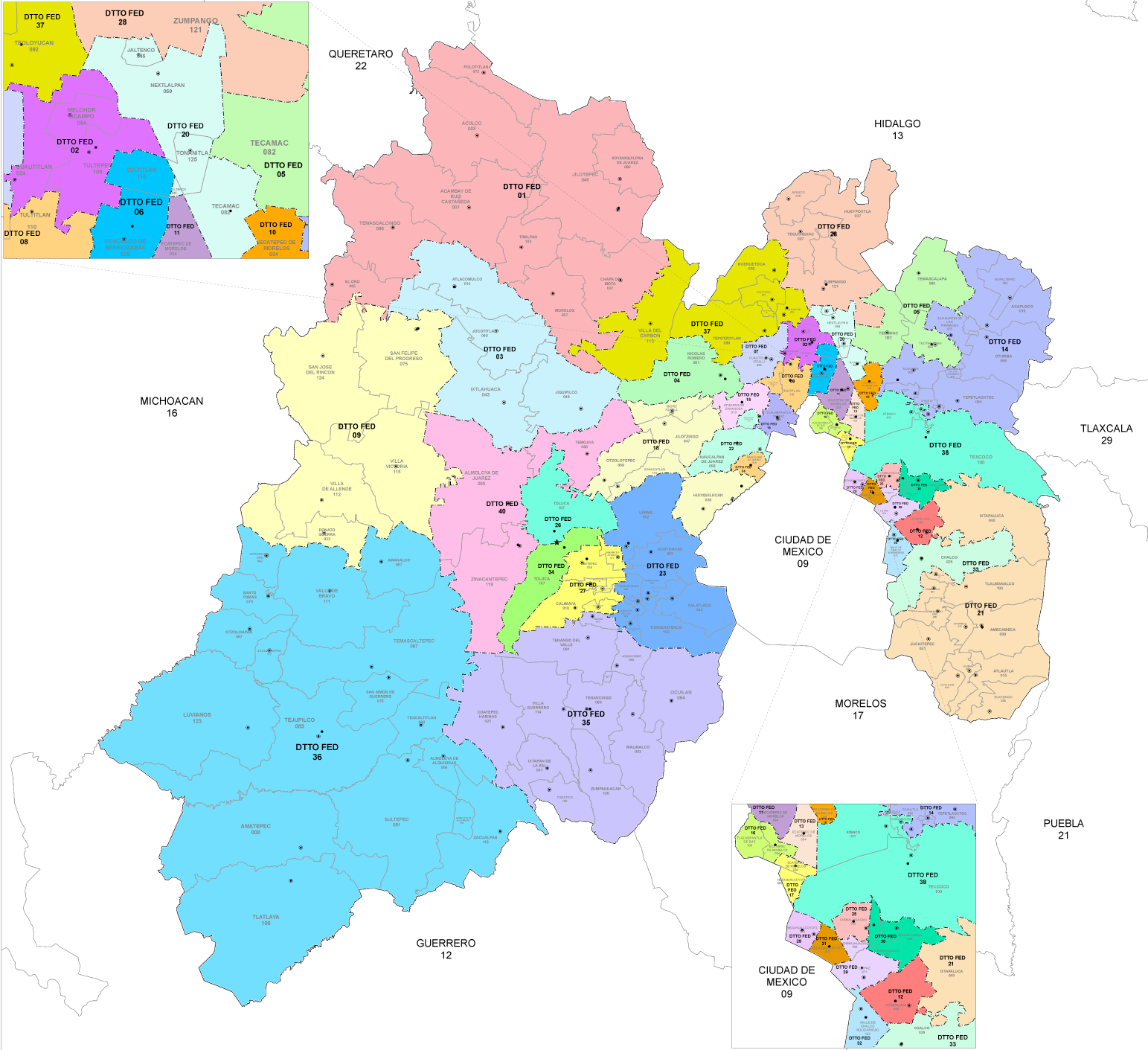
- State of Mexico's districts since 2023

Incumbent
- Member: Pedro Mario Zenteno
- Party: ▌Morena
- Congress: 66th (2024–2027)

District
- State: State of Mexico
- Head town: Teoloyucan
- Coordinates: 19°44′N 99°11′W
- Covers: Coyotepec, Huehuetoca, Teoloyucan, Tepotzotlán, Villa del Carbón
- PR region: Fifth
- Precincts: 152
- Population: 435,225 (2020 census)

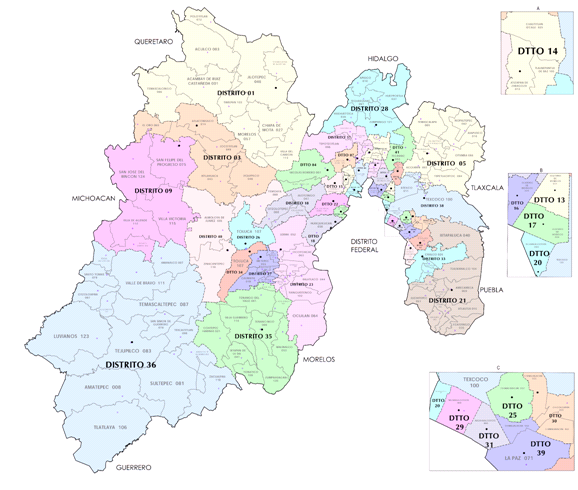
2017–2022 districting scheme

The 37th federal electoral district of the State of Mexico (Spanish: Distrito electoral federal 37 del Estado de México) is one of the 300 electoral districts into which Mexico is divided for elections to the federal Chamber of Deputies and one of 40 such districts in the State of Mexico.

It elects one deputy to the lower house of Congress for each three-year legislative session by means of the first-past-the-post system. Votes cast in the district also count towards the calculation of proportional representation ("plurinominal") deputies elected from the fifth region.

The 37th to 40th districts were created by the Federal Electoral Institute (IFE) in its 2005 redistricting process and were first contested in the 2006 general election.

The current member for the district, elected in the 2024 general election, is Pedro Mario Zenteno Santaella of the National Regeneration Movement (Morena).

== District territory ==
Under the 2023 districting plan adopted by the National Electoral Institute (INE), which is to be used for the 2024, 2027 and 2030 federal elections, the 37th district is located in the centre-north of the state and covers 152 electoral precincts (secciones electorales) across five of its 125 municipalities:

- Coyotepec, Huehuetoca, Teoloyucan, Tepotzotlán and Villa del Carbón.

The head town (cabecera distrital), where results from individual polling stations are gathered together and tallied, is the city of Teoloyucan. In the 2020 census, the district reported a total population of 435,225.

== Previous districting schemes ==
Evolution of electoral district numbers
	1974	1978	1996	2005	2017	2023
State of Mexico	15	34	36	40	41	40
Chamber of Deputies	196	300				

Under the previous districting plans enacted by the INE and its predecessors, the 37th district was situated as follows:

2017–2022

The municipalities of Coyotepec, Cuautitlán, Melchor Ocampo, Teoloyucan and Tepotzotlán. The head town was at Cuautitlán.

2005–2017

The municipalities of Jaltenco, Melchor Ocampo, Nextlalpan, Tonanitla, the northern exclave of Tultitlán, a few neighbourhoods in the extreme north of Ecatepec and the eastern third of Cuautitlán. The head town was at Cuautitlán.

== Deputies returned to Congress ==
(Mexico) National parties
- Current
- PAN
- PRI
- PT
- PVEM
- MC
- Morena
- PAZ
- Somos
- Defunct or local only
- PLM
- PNR
- PRM
- PNM
- PP
- PPS
- PARM
- PFCRN
- CON
- PANAL
- PSD
- PES
- PES
- PRD

State of Mexico's 37th district
Election	Deputy	Party	Term	Legislature
2006	Francisco Javier Santos Arreola	Party of the Democratic Revolution	2006–2009	60th Congress
2009	Israel Reyes Ledesma Magaña	Institutional Revolutionary Party	2009–2012	61st Congress
2012	Francisco Javier Fernández Clamont	Institutional Revolutionary Party	2012–2015	62nd Congress
2015	Gabriel Casillas Zanatta (Note: Casillas Zanatta resigned his seat on 16 September 2017 to take up a position in the administration of Governor Alfredo del Mazo. Cardozo Estévez, his alternate, was sworn in on 19 September.); José Luis Cardozo Estévez	Institutional Revolutionary Party	2015–2017; 2017–2018	63rd Congress
2018	Pedro Mario Zenteno Santaella (Note: Zenteno Santaella resigned his seat on 4 December 2018. Arenas Madrigal, his alternate, was sworn in on 6 December.); Edgar Eduardo Arenas Madrigal	National Regeneration Movement	2018; 2018–2021	64th Congress
2021	Javier Huerta Jurado	National Regeneration Movement	2021–2024	65th Congress
2024	Pedro Mario Zenteno Santaella	National Regeneration Movement	2024–2027	66th Congress

== Presidential elections ==
State of Mexico's 37th district
Election	District won by	Party or coalition	%
2018	Andrés Manuel López Obrador	Juntos Haremos Historia	59.2890
2024	Claudia Sheinbaum Pardo	Sigamos Haciendo Historia	68.4344
