= Tomás Fernández =

Tomás Fernández may refer to:

- Tomás Fernández (footballer, born 1915), Cuban forward for the Cuba national football team
- Tomas Fernandez (footballer, born 1989), Swedish midfielder for Gefle IF
- Tomás Fernández (footballer, born 1998), Argentine forward for Club Agropecuario Argentino
- Tomás Fernández de Medrano, 16th century nobleman, author, knight of Saint John and Secretary of State and War for the Dukes of Savoy
- Tomy Fernández, full name Tomás Fernández Sabatini, Spanish forward for Valladolid
