= Francisco Santos Arreola =

Mexican politician

- Born: 23 July 1973 (age 52); State of Mexico, Mexico
- Occupation: Politician
- Political party: PRD

Francisco Javier Santos Arreola (born 23 July 1973) is a Mexican politician affiliated with the Party of the Democratic Revolution (PRD). In the 2006 general election he was elected to the Chamber of Deputies to represent the State of Mexico's 37th district during the 60th session of Congress.
