= Mario Fernández Pelaz =

Spanish politician (1943–2024)

Deputy Lehendakari
- In office 12 January 1982 – 27 January 1985
- Preceded by: Martín Ugalde Orradre (1975)
- Succeeded by: Javier García Egotxeaga

Minister of Labour of the Basque Government
- In office 1980–1984
- Preceded by: Juan Iglesias Garrigos
- Succeeded by: Javier Caño Moreno

Member of the Basque Parliament for Biscay
- In office 22 March 1984 – 1 October 1986

Personal details
- Born: 4 November 1943; Bilbao, Spain
- Died: 10 December 2024 (aged 81); Las Arenas, Spain
- Political party: EAJ; EA
- Education: University of Deusto
- Occupation: Lawyer

Mario Fernández Pelaz (4 November 1943 – 10 December 2024) was a Spanish lawyer and politician. A member of the Basque Nationalist Party and Eusko Alkartasuna, he served as Deputy Lehendakari from 1982 to 1985, as Basque Minister of Labour from 1980 to 1984, and was a member of the Basque Parliament from 1984 to 1986.

Fernández died in Las Arenas on 10 December 2024, at the age of 81.
