= Francisco Javier Fernández Clamont =

Mexican politician

- Born: 10 April 1972 (age 54); Cuautitlán, Mexico
- Education: UNAM
- Political party: PRI
- Spouse: Eva Luz Heredia López

Francisco Javier Fernández Clamont (born 10 April 1972) is a Mexican politician affiliated with the Institutional Revolutionary Party (PRI). In the 2012 general election he was elected to the Chamber of Deputies to represent the State of Mexico's 37th district during the 62nd session of Congress, and on 1 February 2019 he was appointed director of the Mexico State Institute against Addictions (Instituto Mexiquense Contra las Adicciones).
