= Javier Fernández (footballer, born 1994) =

Uruguayan association football player

Personal information
- Full name: Axel Javier Fernández Berón
- Date of birth: 3 September 1994 (age 32)
- Place of birth: Carmelo, Uruguay
- Height: 1.85 m (6 ft 1 in)
- Position: Forward

Team information
- Current team: Rocha

Senior career*
Years	Team	Apps	(Gls)
2014–2020	Plaza Colonia	59	(11)
2021–2022	Oriental		
2022–	Rocha		
- * Club domestic league appearances and goals as of 10 July 2022

Axel Javier Fernández Berón (born 3 September 1994) is a Uruguayan footballer who plays as a forward for Rocha in the Uruguayan Primera División Amateur.

== Career ==
=== Plaza Colonia ===
Fernández began his professional career with then-Uruguayan Segunda División club Plaza Colonia, graduating from the club's youth system in 2014. He made his league debut for the club on 19 April 2014, coming on as a 70th-minute substitute for Facundo Waller in a 1–1 draw with Rocha. He scored his first goal for the club the following season as part of a brace in a 3–0 victory over Huracán.

== Career statistics ==
=== Club ===
As of match played 11 August 2019

Appearances and goals by club, season and competition
Club	Season	League			Cup		Other		Total	
Club	Season	Division	Apps	Goals	Apps	Goals	Apps	Goals	Apps	Goals
Plaza Colonia	2013–14	Uruguayan Segunda División	3	0	—	—	—	—	3	0
Plaza Colonia	2014–15	Uruguayan Segunda División	15	5	—	—	—	—	15	5
Plaza Colonia	2015–16	Uruguayan Primera División	2	0	—	—	—	—	2	0
Plaza Colonia	2016	Uruguayan Primera División	5	2	—	—	—	—	5	2
Plaza Colonia	2017	Uruguayan Primera División	13	1	—	—	—	—	13	1
Plaza Colonia	2018	Uruguayan Segunda División	17	3	—	—	—	—	17	3
Plaza Colonia	2019	Uruguayan Primera División	4	0	—	—	—	—	4	0
Career total			59	11	—	—	—	—	59	11
