= Carlos Fernández =

Carlos Fernández may refer to:

== Law and politics ==
- Carlos Fernández Gondín (1938–2017), Cuban politician
- Carlos Rafael Fernández (born 1954), Argentine politician
- Carlos Fernández Carriedo (born 1963), Spanish economist and politician
- Carlos Fernández (politician), Argentine politician

== Sports ==
- Carlos Fernández (wrestler) (born 1965), Spanish wrestler
- Carlos Fernández (footballer, born 1984), Peruvian footballer
- Carlos Fernández (footballer, born 1992), Honduran footballer
- Carlos Fernández (footballer, born 1996), Spanish footballer

== Others ==
- Carlos Fernández Shaw (1865–1911), Spanish poet and playwright
- Carlos Fernández Bácula (1888–?), Peruvian diplomat and smuggler
- Carlos Graef Fernández (1911–1988), Mexican physicist and mathematician
- Carlos Fernández Vallespín (1913–1977), Spanish military officer
- Carlos Fernández Liria (born 1959), Spanish philosopher and academic
- Carlos Fernández Valdovinos (born 1965), Paraguayan economist
- Carlos Fernández González (born 1966), Mexican businessman
- Carlos Fernández-Pello, Spanish mechanical engineer

== Other uses ==
- Engineer Carlos Fernández Casado Bridge, Cable-stayed bridge in León, Spain

== See also ==
- Carlos Fernandes (disambiguation)
- José Carlos Fernández (disambiguation)
