= Gabriel Fernández =

Gabriel Fernández may refer to:

- Gabriel Fernández (basketball) (born 1976), Argentine basketball player
- Gabriel Fernández (footballer, born 1977), Argentine midfielder
- Gabriel Fernández (footballer, born 1992), Argentine defender
- Gabriel Fernández (footballer, born 1994), Uruguayan forward
- Gabi (footballer, born 1983), Spanish footballer
- Gabriel Fernández Ledesma (1900–1983), Mexican painter
- Gabriel Fernández Álvez (1943–2008), Spanish composer
- Vicentico (Gabriel Julio Fernández Capello, born 1964), Argentinian musician and composer
- Gabriel Fernández (singer) (born 1968), Venezuelan singer and actor
- Gabriel Fernandez (2005–2013), American boy who was tortured and murdered
  - The Trials of Gabriel Fernandez, a 2020 documentary produced by Netflix about the murder

== See also ==
- Gabriel Fernandes (born 1988), Indian association footballer
