= Frank Fernández =

Frank Fernández may refer to:

- Frank Michael Fernández Jr. (born 1918), educator, historian, and Isleño advocate
- Frank Fernández (writer) (born 1930), Cuban-American author of a history of Cuban anarchism
- Frank Fernández (baseball) (born 1943), former Major League Baseball catcher
- Frank Fernández (pianist) (born 1944), Cuban pianist and composer
- Frank Fernández Pardo (born 1992), Chilean footballer

== See also ==
- Francisco Fernández (disambiguation)
