= Javier Fernández Aguado =

Javier Fernández Aguado (born 1961 in Madrid), Spanish PhD in Economics, author and expert in Management.

He holds a PhD in economics from the Complutense University (Madrid, 1996). His awards include the J. A. Artigas National Award for Best Research in Social Sciences 1997 and the Peter Drucker Award for Innovation in Management (USA, 2008), being the only Spanish author who has received this distinction. He is currently president of MindValue.

Fernández Aguado has written thirty-three books and several of them have been published in a collection that goes by his name, launched by LID Editorial. He has created six models of two models of organizational diagnosis ("Managing the Imperfect" and "Organizational Pathologies"), and several more dedicated to organizational change like "Feelings Management", "Will Management" or "Management by Habits".

His thought has been analyzed by different authors in over three hundred books and essays. Twenty of them have been brought together by the British brand consultant Christopher Smith in the book Management Challenges for the XXI Century. Authors of the likes of Eduardo Punset, Marcos Urarte, and Nuria Chinchilla contribute to the text.

600 experts from twelve countries in Europe and America attended a symposium that was held in Madrid in 2010 to study his work and his thinking. A book containing the lectures was published some months later.

== Books ==
=== Individual ===
- Le sfide dell’esistenza, Ares, 1990.
- La causa sui en Descartes, Semsa, 1991.
- La arrogancia de Hayek, UCM, 1993.
- Historia de la Escuela de Comercio de Madrid y su influencia en la formación gerencial española (1850-1970), AECA-Icotme, 1997.
- La formación como ventaja competitiva, ESUMA-University of Hertfordshire, 1997.
- Ética, profesión y virtud, Grupo de Estudios Jurídicos, 1998.
- Habilidades directivas: una aproximación, Seguros Génesis, 1999.
- Dirigir personas en la empresa. Enfoque conceptual y aplicaciones prácticas, Pirámide, 1999.
- Sobre el hombre y la empresa, Instituto Superior de Técnicas y Prácticas Bancarias-ISTPB, 1999.
- Crear empresa, CIE Dossat 2000, 2000.
- Mil consejos para un directivo, CIE Dossat 2000, 2000.
- Dirección por Hábitos y Desarrollo de Personas, La Caixa, 2001.
- La gestión de lo imperfecto, La Caixa, 2001.
- Dirección por Valores, AECA, 2001.
- La empresa en el cine. 70 películas para la formación empresarial, CIE Dossat 2000, 2001.
- Curso de habilidades directivas, Instituto Superior de Técnicas y Prácticas Bancarias-ISTPB, 2001.
- La felicidad posible, CIE Dossat 2000, 2001.
- Dirigir y motivar equipos. Claves para un buen gobierno, Ariel, 2002.
- Management: la enseñanza de los clásicos, Ariel, 2003.
- Managing the Imperfect, Instituto de Estudios Superiores-Deloitte, 2003.
- Management par la Valeur, Safetykleen, 2003.
- Feelings Management. La Gestión de los sentimientos organizativos, la Caixa, 2004.
- Liderar en tiempos de incertidumbre, Mindvalue-Hertz, 2005.
- Fundamentos de organización de empresas. Breve historia del Management, Narcea, 2006.
- Patologías organizativas, Mindvalue, 2007.
- Formar directivos y otros ensayos, Instituto Internacional Bravo Murillo, 2007.
- El alma de las organizaciones, MindValue, 2009.
- Templarios. Enseñanzas para organizaciones contemporáneas, MindValue, 2010.
- Versión con introducción y notas de Ética a Nicómaco, de Aristóteles, LID, 2001.
- Preparar la postcrisis. Enseñanzas de la Grecia clásica, Crecento-Expansión, 2010.
- 1010 Consejos para un emprendedor, LID, 2011.
- El diccionario del liderazgo, LID, 2012.
- Roma, Escuela de directivos, LID, 2012.
- "Egipto, escuela de directivos", LID, 2013
- "El management del III Reich", LID, 2015
- "¡Camaradas! De Lenin a hoy", LID, 2017
- "Jesuitas, liderar talento libre", LID, 2018
- "Liderar en un mundo imperfecto", LID, 2019
- "2000 años liderando equipos", Kolima, 2020

=== Collective ===
- Diccionario enciclopédico Empresarial, BBV-Instituto Superior de Técnicas y Prácticas Bancarias-ISTPB, 1999.
- El euro y la empresa, Instituto Superior de Técnicas y Prácticas Bancarias-ISTPB, 1999.
- Cómo elaborar un manual de franquicia. Un ejemplo práctico, CIE Dossat 2000, 2000.
- Proverbios para la empresa. Sabiduría de siempre para directivos de hoy, CIE Dossat 2000, 2ª edición, 2000.
- Manual de creación de empresa. Como emprender y consolidar un proyecto empresarial, Edisofer, 2000.
- Técnicas para mejorar la gestión empresarial, Instituto Superior de Técnicas y prácticas Bancarias, 2000.
- Gestión y Dirección de Recursos Humanos, Instituto Superior de Técnicas y prácticas Bancarias, 2000.
- La inversión bursátil sin secretos, Instituto Superior de técnicas y prácticas Bancarias-BBVA, 2000.
- La ética en los negocios, Ariel, 2001.
- Diccionario Enciclopédico Profesional de Finanzas y Empresa, ACCENTURE-Instituto Superior de Técnicas y Prácticas Bancarias, 20001.
- Dirigir en el siglo XXI, Deusto, 2002.
- Nuevas claves para la Dirección Estratégica, Ariel, 2002.
- Management español: los mejores textos, Ariel, 2002.
- Creación de empresa; los mejores textos, Ariel, 2003.
- Desaprendizaje organizativo, Ariel, 2004.
- Ética y actividad empresarial, Minerva, 2004.
- Will Management, GEC, 2004.
- La concepción española del liderazgo, Deloitte-Instituto de Empresa, 2004.
- Progreso directivo y Coaching empresarial, Eunsa, 2005.
- Feelings Management. Una aplicación práctica, Thinking Heads, 2005.
- La contabilidad como magisterio. Homenaje al profesor Rafael Ramos Cerveró, Universidad de Sevilla-Universidad de Valladolid, 2005.
- El arte de emprender. Manual para la formación de emprendedores, Universidad Nebrija-BBVA, 2007.
- Cambiar para crecer, Confederación Española de Directivos y Ejecutivos-CEDE, 2007.
- Patologías en las organizaciones, LID, 2007.
- La soledad del directivo, LI, 2011.
- La sociedad que no amaba a las mujeres, LID, 2012.
- Claves del Management, LID, 2013.
