= Tomas Fernandez (footballer, born 1989) =

Swedish footballer

Personal information
- Full name: Tomas Fernandez Gonzalez
- Date of birth: 30 November 1989 (age 36)
- Place of birth: Sweden
- Height: 1.73 m (5 ft 8 in)
- Position: Midfielder

Youth career
- IK Sätra
- 2001–2009: Gefle IF

Senior career*
Years	Team	Apps	(Gls)
2009	Gefle IF	1	(0)
2010–2011	Brynäs IF	19	(5)
2012–2013	Fellingsbro GoIF	12	(3)
2014–2016	IK Sturehov		
2016–2017	IK Sätra	11	(6)
2018–2019	Valbo FF	13	(0)
- * Club domestic league appearances and goals

Tomas Fernandez Gonzalez (born 30 November 1989) is a Swedish footballer who plays as a midfielder. He is currently a free agent.

== Career ==
IK Sätra were Fernandez's first youth team, he left them in 2001 to sign for Gefle IF. Eight years later, Fernandez was moved into their first-team squad during the 2009 Allsvenskan campaign, with manager Pelle Olsson selecting him for his professional debut during a home defeat to IFK Göteborg. In 2010, Fernandez signed for Brynäs IF of Division 3. Five goals in nineteen appearances followed over two seasons with the club. He joined Division 5 team Fellingsbro GoIF on 24 May 2012. Two years and twelve appearances later, fellow Division 3 side IK Sturehov signed Fernandez in December 2013. He remained with them until mid-2016.

Division 3's IK Sätra resigned Fernandez in August 2016. He moved up a division in 2018, joining Valbo FF of Division 2. He terminated his contract on 25 January 2019, having appeared thirteen times for the club.

== Career statistics ==
As of 30 January 2019.

Club statistics
Club	Season	League			Cup		Continental		Other		Total	
Club	Season	Division	Apps	Goals	Apps	Goals	Apps	Goals	Apps	Goals	Apps	Goals
Gefle IF	2009	Allsvenskan	1	0	0	0	—		0	0	1	0
Brynäs IF	2010	Division 3	13	4	0	0	—		0	0	13	4
Brynäs IF	2011	Division 3	6	1	0	0	—		0	0	6	1
Brynäs IF	Total		19	5	0	0	—		0	0	19	5
Fellingsbro GoIF	2012	Division 5	5	1	0	0	—		0	0	5	1
Fellingsbro GoIF	2013	Division 5	7	2	0	0	—		0	0	7	2
Fellingsbro GoIF	Total		12	3	0	0	—		0	0	12	3
IK Sturehov	2014	Division 3	9	0	0	0	—		0	0	9	0
IK Sätra	2017	Division 3	11	6	0	0	—		0	0	11	6
Valbo FF	2018	Division 2	13	0	0	0	—		0	0	13	0
Career total			65	14	0	0	—		0	0	65	14
