= Alex Fernandez =

Alex Fernandez or Fernandes may refer to:

- Alex Fernandez (actor) (born 1967), American actor
- Alex Fernandez (baseball) (born 1969), Cuban-American baseball pitcher
- Alex Fernández (footballer, born 1970), Colombian football defender
- Álex Fernández Sama (born 1974), Spanish football midfielder
- Àlex Fernández (footballer, born 1974), Spanish football midfielder
- Álex Fernández (footballer, born 1992), Spanish football midfielder for Cadiz
- Álex Fernández (singer), Mexican singer
- Alex Fernandez, member of a young detective club from Ghostwriter

== See also ==
- Alex Fernandes (born 1973), Brazilian-Mexican football striker
- Alejandro Fernández (disambiguation)
- Alex Fernandes (disambiguation)
