= Julián Fernández =

Julián Fernández is the name of:

- Julián Fernández (footballer, born 1989), Argentine football centre-back for Messina
- Julián Fernández (footballer, born 1995), Argentine football midfielder for Newell's Old Boys
- Julián Fernández (footballer, born 2004), Argentine football forward for Vélez Sarsfield
- Julián Fernández (baseball) (born 1995), baseball player
