= Alejandro Fernández (disambiguation) =

Alejandro Fernández (born 1971) is a Mexican singer.

Alejandro Fernández may also refer to:

- Alejandro Fernández (racing driver) (born 1996), Colombian racing driver
- Alejandro Fernández (sport shooter) (born 1959), Mexican sport shooter
- Álex Fernández (born 1992), Spanish footballer, full name Alejandro Fernández Iglesias
- Jano (footballer, born 1980), Spanish footballer, full name Alejandro Fernández Vázquez
- Alejandro Fernández de Araoz (1894–1970), Spanish banker
- Alejandro Fernández Almendras (born 1971), Chilean filmmaker
- Alejandro Fernández (politician) (born 1976), Spanish politician
- Alejandro Fernández Sordo (1921–2009), Spanish politician

== See also ==
- Alex Fernandez (disambiguation)
