= Oliver Fernández =

Oliver Fernández may refer to:

- Oliver Fernández (tennis) (born 1972), Mexican tennis player
- Oliver Fernández (footballer) (1983–2012), Bolivian footballer
