= Mariano Fernández =

Mariano Fernández may refer to:

- Mariano Fernández de Echeverría y Veytia (1718–1789), Mexican writer, philosopher and historian; see Lorenzo Boturini Benaduci
- Mariano Fernández (Chilean diplomat) (born 1945), Chilean politician and diplomat
- Mariano Fernández Bermejo (born 1948), Spanish politician and jurist
- Mariano Fernández (footballer, born 1978), Argentine defender for Club Atlético Lanús
- Mariano Fernández (footballer, born 1988), Argentine defender for Club Agropecuario Argentino
- Mariano Fernández (politician), vice-governor of La Pampa Province, Argentina
