= Rafael Fernández =

Rafael Fernández may refer to:

- Rafael Fernández de Villanueva Cortez (1839–1931), Peruvian statesman and lawyer, prime minister (1909 to 1910)
- Rafael Fernández Reyes (1897–?), Chilean general and fencer
- Rafael Fernández Álvarez (1913–2010), Spanish politician and former political exile
- Rafael Fernández (football manager) (born 1977), Mexican football manager
- Rafael Fernández Pérez (born 1980), Spanish futsal player who plays for ElPozo Murcia as a goalkeeper
- Rafael Fernández Martínez (born 1989), known as Chumbi, Spanish footballer who plays for UD Almería, mainly as a forward
- Rafael Fernandez (baseball, born 1988), Dominican baseball coach
- Rafael Fernández (footballer) (born 2000), Mexican football centre-back

== See also ==
- Rafael Fernandes (disambiguation)
