= Alberto Fernández (disambiguation) =

Alberto Fernández (born 1959) is an Argentine politician, lawyer, and academic who served as president of Argentina from 2019 to 2023.

Alberto Fernandez may also refer to:

- Alberto Fernández (footballer, born 1943), Spanish former footballer
- Alberto Fernández de Rosa (born 1944), Argentine actor
- Alberto Fernández (cyclist) (1955–1984), Spanish cyclist
- Alberto Fernandez (diplomat) (born 1958), United States official and diplomat
- Alberto Fernández Díaz (born 1961), Spanish politician
- Alberto Fernández (sport shooter) (born 1983), Spanish trap shooter
- Alberto Fernández de la Puebla (born 1984), Spanish cyclist
- Alberto Fernández (footballer, born 1999), Spanish footballer
- Alberto Fernández (basketball), Peruvian Olympic basketball player
- Alberto Fernández Mindiola (born 1927), Colombian singer and songwriter
