= Federico Fernández =

Federico Fernández may refer to:

- Federico Fernández (footballer) (born 1989), Argentine footballer
- Federico Fernández (equestrian) (born 1968), Mexican equestrian
- Federico Fernández Cavada (1831–1871), American Civil War officer
- Federico Gastón Fernández (born 1989), Argentine handball player
