= Francisco Javier Fernández (politician) =

Spanish politician

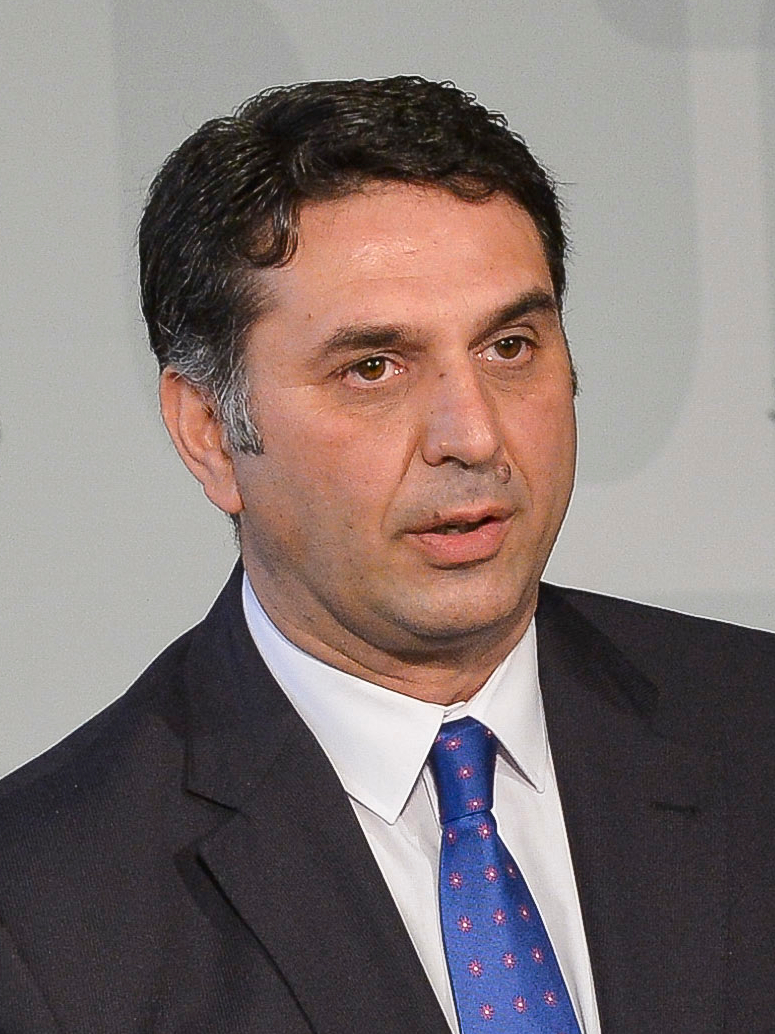
- Francisco Javier Fernández in 2015
- Born: 1969 (age 56–57); Utrera

Francisco Javier Fernández is the minister for tourism and sport in Andalusia, Spain.
