= Krystal Fernandez =

American sports journalist (born 1971)

Krystal Fernandez (born November 11, 1971) is an American sports journalist. She joined Fox Sports Radio in March 2004 as the morning update anchor and also serves as a sports/feature reporter for KTTV/Fox 11 TV in Los Angeles. She was released from Fox Sports Radio on January 20, 2009.

On May 5, 2009, Dan LeBatard reported on his show on 790 the Ticket (WAXY-AM) that Krystal will join Jorge Sedano as the new host of 790's morning show in Miami, FL. Fernandez left this show at the end of September 2009 to be closer to her Los Angeles roots and boyfriend, former Los Angeles Dodgers pitcher, Darren Dreifort.

Prior to joining Fox, she was a sports reporter and anchor for a number of radio stations in Southern California. Fernandez is the sideline reporter for the Gender Bowl. She is the youngest of six kids, and has four brothers and one sister. Fernandez resides in the Greater Los Angeles area.

In September 2010, Krystal Fernandez married her boyfriend and former Los Angeles Dodger Pitcher Darren Dreifort.
