= Francisco Fernández (Chilean footballer) =

Chilean footballer (born 1975)

Personal information
- Full name: Francisco Javier Fernández Torrejón
- Date of birth: August 19, 1975 (age 51)
- Place of birth: Santiago, Chile
- Height: 1.69 m (5 ft 7 in)
- Position: Midfielder

Youth career
- Colo-Colo

Senior career*
Years	Team	Apps	(Gls)
1992–1998	Colo-Colo	43	(1)
1998	Deportes Temuco	20	(2)
1999	Santiago Morning	38	(0)
2000–2001	Universidad Católica	33	(0)
2002	Deportes Temuco	9	(0)
2003	Mito HollyHock	20	(0)
2005	Deportes La Serena	16	(0)
2006	Santiago Morning	17	(2)
Total		196	(5)

International career
2000	Chile	2	(0)
- * Club domestic league appearances and goals

Francisco Javier Fernández Torrejón (born August 19, 1975) is a former Chilean football player, who played for clubs of Chile and Japan, the Chile national U-20 football team and the Chile national football team.

== Honours ==
=== Player ===
Colo-Colo

- Primera División de Chile (3): 1996, 1997 Clausura, 1998
- Copa Chile (1): 1994
