= Free preview =

Marketing technique

A free preview (also called a free preview weekend and sometimes referred to under the portmanteau "freeview") is a stunt programming concept in which a pay television service or channel tier is exhibited without signal encryption to customers of a multichannel television provider (cable, satellite, IPTV or over-the-top MVPD) at no cost for an extended time period.

Such events, which typically run anywhere from two days to one month on average, are held mainly to incentivize subscribers into purchasing the service that is being transmitted during the applicable timeframe.

== Background ==
=== History ===
The free preview concept was originated in the early 1970s by Home Box Office (HBO). By 1973, within a year of its November 1972 launch, HBO was carried on 14 cable systems around the country, located in New York and Pennsylvania. The channel had an exceptionally high churn rate as subscribers would sample the service for a few weeks, eventually become tired of seeing the same films being repeated over and over, and then ultimately cancel their subscriptions. Realizing the struggles it was facing because of this, HBO partnered with a cable system in Lawrence, Massachusetts to allow subscribers to view the service's programming for free on channel 3. After one month, HBO was moved to channel 6, where it would be scrambled. The preview proved popular among the cable provider's subscribers, helping to increase subscriptions for HBO.

HBO continued the concept an expanded it other cable systems in 1977. Soon, other premium cable services (such as Showtime and The Movie Channel) began offering periodic free previews themselves in order to attract new subscribers.

=== Concept ===
Free previews are generally used to increase subscribership of a premium channel, out-of-market sports package or a higher-end programming tier by allowing access to a service typically encrypted from viewing by customers who do not subscribe to it during the preview period. Although any subscription television service around the world can hold such an event, free previews most commonly occur with pay television providers in the North American countries of the United States and Canada. For commercial-free services, these events may feature appeals to the audience between programs to order the service, usually by phone or the internet. Television providers typically offer the premium services at discount rates or with extended periods of free service (generally one or three months, before standard pricing applies thereafter) for new subscribers during the preview period, often with installation fees normally incurred for subscribing to the service at any other time waived.

These preview events typically run during the weekend, as people who tend to work or attend school during the week are more likely to be at home to watch. As such, free previews originally ran only on Saturdays and Sundays until the early 1990s (although HBO occasionally held single-day free previews during the work week through the late 1970s). Providers and pay services began starting them on Fridays as early as the late 1980s, these three-day events would not become more common until the 1990s. During the mid to late 2000s, free previews for premium channels began to expand to four-day periods (typically from Friday to Monday, although some subscription television providers have even occasionally offered five-day previews starting on Thursdays). In effect, free previews for premium channels are usually scheduled in tandem with the premiere of a new or returning high-profile made-for-cable television series, a special (such as a concert), and/or a major feature film. These preview periods can run anywhere between one and five times each year. Although free previews have historically been carried nationally by all pay television service providers (particularly for premium channels), it has become common since the 2000s for preview events to only be made available to an individual provider or a selected number of participating providers.

Programs that air during free preview events of premium channels generally do not expurgate content deemed inappropriate for basic cable or broadcast television, meaning that some of the programs shown during the period may include graphic violence; nudity; overt sexual content; strong profanity or any combination thereof, potentially allowing children to observe such content if parental controls (such as the V-chip) are not activated. This was a particular issue before the advent of digital cable as these preview events usually ran on local origination channels that are available on basic cable tiers accessible to any subscriber. However, some of the more risque content featured on premium networks, such as (with some past exceptions) Cinemax's now-defunct After Dark block of softcore adult series and films, usually does not air on free preview weekends.

Until the early 2000s, television providers and premium services ran hosted interstitials between programs, which featured program and channel promotions, prize giveaways and behind-the-scenes information; cable and satellite providers typically inserted their internally distributed interstitials in place of promotional breaks and “making of” film specials shown on the showcased premium service’s network feed. Actors, comedians and other entertainers (such as Norm Crosby, Greg Kinnear, Robert Urich and Sinbad) often were used to host free preview events for premium cable services during the 1980s and 1990s. Many cable systems offered additional incentives to entice people into subscribing to a premium service by offering prizes, such as expense-paid vacations to the location where the free preview was taking place (for example, Rich Heritage Inc.—a Des Moines-based cable marketing firm and production company founded by Terry Rich, who, until 1998, hosted many of the free previews the company produced for providers such as Heritage Communications, Comcast, Tele-Communications Inc. [TCI] and Cox Communications—produced interstitials during free previews of HBO, Showtime, Cinemax and The Disney Channel that included nightly prize giveaways to Walt Disney World – where the Rich Heritage-produced free preview events originated until 1999 – and then to the MGM Grand Las Vegas – where its preview events originated until 2002).

In recent years, the free preview concept has been restructured due to the migration of premium cable services to digital programming tiers to which many conventional pay television subscribers have upgraded since channel infrastructure upgrades occurred with the advent of digital cable. With digital cable having become commonplace since the early 2000s, most cable and satellite providers have since eschewed using local origination channels to carry free preview events and no longer produce interstitials for events involving premium channels; instead, providers simply unencrypt the service's signal on the designated channel slots of the main channel and all related multiplex channels that are carried by the provider as well as in some cases, a related pay service (for example, in the United States, HBO offers free previews either involving only its eight-channel multiplex, or both the HBO channel slate and the seven-channel multiplex of its sister network Cinemax, depending on which service is offered during that given preview – both networks are owned by Warner Bros. Discovery) during the period. Some video-on-demand services, pay-per-view sports packages and select basic channels available on higher subscription tiers also occasionally offer free previews, sometimes for as long as one to two weeks. In the case of out-of-market sports packages, previews for those services are most commonly held during the first week of a professional or collegiate sports league's regular season, with a second free preview window often occurring shortly after a professional league's all-star game break where the price of the package is halved in the wind-up towards the latter half of the season for playoff positioning.

In 2016, Verizon FiOS began offering their TV customers the ability to preview premium channels for a period of 48 hours, whenever they want, using their remote control. The feature, referred to as "Free View" or "Fios Free Weekends", can be enabled once for each premium network, including HBO, Showtime, Cinemax, Starz, and Epix, and can be used every year.

== See also ==
- Pay television
- Pledge drive
