= Dream Job season 2 =

Dream Job
- Season 2
- No. of episodes: 10

Release
- Original network: ESPN

The second season of Dream Job, the ESPN American reality television show that searches for new on-air talent for the network, began on Tuesday, September 14, 2004. Like the show's first season, this edition was also looking for a new anchor for SportsCenter. A talent search for the show had begun in late June, 2004. ESPN anchor Stuart Scott returned to host the new season.

== Judges ==
The show's judging panel had changes. Gone were first season judges Tony Kornheiser and LaVar Arrington, who had begun play for the Washington Redskins in the 2004–2005 NFL season. Kornheiser and Arrington were replaced by Cold Pizza contributor and Around the Horn panelist Woody Paige, and ESPN NBA analyst Stephen A. Smith. Cold Pizza co-host Kit Hoover and ESPN Vice-president of Talent, Al Jaffe, returned for the second season.

Unlike the judging panel, the voting for season two did not change. The viewing public still had one vote (which was given to the contestant who had received the highest number of votes from online voting and text messaging) to cut a contestant with. In the first two episodes, the judges were given one vote apiece to vote for a contestant to be cut, with two given to them for the third episode only, making episodes 4-10 also one-cut-apiece shows.

== Contestants ==
Like the first two episodes of season one, the contestants were introduced in 2 groups of six. In episode one, the competing contestants were Valerie Hawrylko, a 31-year-old management consultant from Oakton, Virginia; Brian Startare, a 33-year-old health care management worker from Glassboro, New Jersey; Anish Shroff, a 22-year-old radio anchor who has recently graduated from Syracuse University; Grant Thompson, a 28-year-old writer and actor from Los Angeles; Joe Voyticky, a 37-year-old attorney from Brooklyn, New York; and K.C. James, a 44-year-old account executive from Los Angeles. James had won the Wendy's Wild Card Contest to gain entry onto the show.

The next group of six was introduced in episode two, and, for the first time, featured a second Wendy's Wild Card winner. Episode two's competitors were Jason Ashworth, a 23-year-old assistant tour manager from New Freedom, Pennsylvania; Winston Bell, a 35-year-old banker from Cleveland; Jason Horowitz, a 21-year-old student at Syracuse University who originally hails from West Bloomfield, Michigan; Stephanie Rich, a 35-year-old travel coordinator from Arlington, Texas; Whitney Scott, a 24-year-old sports information assistant from Lockwood, Missouri; and David Holmes, the second Wendy's Wild Card winner, a 22-year-old student at Kent State University from Uniontown, Ohio.

== Episodes ==
=== Episode One ===
Like the first season, the first two episodes of the second season began with the main game being "My SportsCenter", and like the series premiere on February 22, 2004, each of the six contestants competing in the first episode of season two read two SportsCenter highlights, most of them being from sporting events from the past weekend. Thompson went first, and was criticized for being too "schtick" and comedic. James went next, paused twice during his highlight readings, and was criticised for the pauses. Shroff went third and made some mistakes, but was praised for being professional by all four judges.

After the first three contestants read their highlights, an intermission took place, in which a new game called "Get Off the Fence" was introduced. In this game, the contestants were split into three pairs. Each contestant was given a current sports issue which was to be debated by both contestants. Each pair was given two issues apiece. Hawrylko was said to be the best debater by all the judges, while Startare was called the worst. Smith even said he could see Startare sweat during the debate.

When "My SportsCenter" resumed, Voyticky read his highlights. He criticised for being boring and lacking energy. Hawrylko went next, and while she was praised for her debating, she was criticized for trying to tell too many jokes during her highlight readings. Startare was last to go, and Paige called him "brutal." All six were criticized for using too many clichés.

=== Voting ===
Judge	Contestant voted on
American viewing public	Startare
Woody Paige	Voyticky
Kit Hoover	James
Stephen A. Smith	Voyticky
Al Jaffe	Voyticky

With 3 votes, Voyticky was the first contestant cut from the show in its second season.

=== Episode Two ===
The second group of six was featured in the second episode. A second contestant was going to be cut, reducing the number of competitors to 10.

This show's "My SportsCenter" was reading a list of "Top 5 Plays", while video of those plays was shown. Horowitz was up first and was presented with a list of top 5 catches, which included a fish being caught at the Bassmaster Classic. All four judges (including Smith) praised Horowitz for writing and speaking clearly. Scott was next with a list of top 5 shots, including a great shot in a table tennis tournament. She was called "solid", but Paige told her to "keep improving." Holmes then took his turn, having the top 5 blocks for his segment, with the top block being an incredible knockaway by Detroit Pistons star Tayshaun Prince on Indiana Pacers guard Reggie Miller in game one of the 2004 Eastern Conference Finals. Holmes got half praise, half criticism, and was relieved when Smith let him off the hook for an average performance.

The in-between game was "Fact or Fiction", a regular segment on the real SportsCenter, in which an anchor throws out a topic with an opinion attached to it, and two analysts debate (or even agree) on what they think. The contestants were split into three pairs like the previous week, and were given two topics each, ranging from "Oscar De La Hoya should retire" to "The U.S. will win the Ryder Cup in 2006." Rich was unanimously called the worst debater, while Horowitz just barely won the title of best debater.

Unfortunately for Rich, she was up next in "My SportsCenter", where her list was the top 5 dives. Even worse, the judges (except for Paige) didn't let up, as Hoover called her "slow." Ashworth was next to take the stage, and his list was a list of top 5 saves. He was praised for his energy, but the judges he needed to back up his highlights with facts. Bell was the final contestant to take his turn on the evening with a list of top 5 hits. His enthusiasm was noticed by all, but Smith told him to smile more.

=== Voting ===
Judge	Contestant voted on
American viewing public	Rich
Woody Paige	Rich
Kit Hoover	Rich
Stephen A. Smith	Rich
Al Jaffe	Rich

The vote was unanimous to cut Rich.

=== Episode Three ===
10 became 8 on night three, as for one episode only, two contestants would be voted off instead of one.

The "My SportsCenter" game for this evening was co-anchoring, although it was individuals being cut, not duos. The twist here was at the end of their segment, after a couple of highlight readings and a news story, the pairs would interview a player from a Major League Baseball team. Hawrylko and Horowitz were the first pair to go, and their interviewee was New York Yankees outfielder Gary Sheffield. Horowitz' interview skills were praised, while Hawrylko was said to have needed more work. As a team, Paige said they were good, but needed to display more chemistry. Ashworth and Startare were next to go, and they conducted their interview with Chicago Cubs pitcher Kent Mercker. Startare got praise for much-needed improvement from episode one. Ashworth was criticized for not asking questions that pertained to the current situation, and for asking questions that were too long. Wendy's Wild Card winners Holmes and James were next, and their interviewee was Justin Morneau of the Minnesota Twins. Their lack of chemistry and their interviewing skills were both criticized. Said Paige, "Guys, call your mamas, and tell them to keep the front porch light on. If you don't get better than that, you'll be home soon", a message for both of them, drawing a "Wowza!" from Hoover. Holmes was said to be the better of the two. Following Holmes and James was the debut of a new segment featuring real SportsCenter anchors giving advice to the remaining contestants, titled "U.S. Air Force Wingman." The person giving the advice-the first Dream Job winner, Mike Hall. Hall told them "less is more." "Not every play needs a joke, not every highlight needs style, but every highlight does need information", he said. After the commercial break following Hall's "SportsCenter 101", it was time for Shroff and Scott to show what they could do. Their interviewee was Los Angeles Dodgers pitcher José Lima. A problem arose at the start of the interview, when Scott asked Lima, "Can you hear me?" (He could.) Jaffe said some of the teamwork seemed forced, that it was mediocre. Paige said the interview was embarrassing for both of them because of how it started, and that Shroff wasn't as good as he was in week one. Smith said Scott was better than she was in week two, and agreed with Paige that Shroff had slipped from the first week. The last pair was Thompson and Bell, whose interviewee was Houston Astros catcher Brad Ausmus. Their chemistry was praised, and Bell was praised for telling the viewers at home who they would be interviewing him before the "show" started, something that no other contestant did that night.

=== Voting ===
Judge	Contestant(s) voted on
American viewing public	James and Hawrylko
Woody Paige	James and Holmes
Kit Hoover	James and Hawrylko
Stephen A. Smith	James and Holmes
Al Jaffe	James and Hawrylko

The decision to cut James was unanimous. Hawrylko's elimination kept both Wendy's Wild Card Winners from being cut on the same night, as America's decision to cut her broke the tie between her and Holmes.

=== Episodes four through eight ===
Episode number	Contestant cut	Number of votes garnered
Episode 4	Scott	4, as Shroff also got a vote
Episode 5	Startare	unanimous decision
Episode 6	Bell	unanimous decision
Episode 7	Ashworth	3, as Horowitz and Shroff each got a vote
Episode 8	Horowitz	3, as Thompson also got a vote, but only four were given because Paige had taken ill for the night

=== Voting ===
Judge	Contestant voted on
American viewing public	Shroff
Woody Paige	Shroff
Kit Hoover	Holmes
Stephen A. Smith	Shroff
Al Jaffe	Holmes

America's vote had broken the tie. Just two men were left: David Holmes and Grant Thompson.

=== Episode ten ===
Airing on Tuesday, November 16, 2004, both Holmes and Thompson knew that no mistake would be minor, and that one small error could cost their chance at becoming the anchor. The night opened with Holmes and Thompson going head-to-head in a debate game called "Pardon the Interruption", exactly like the ESPN talk show of the same name. The segment dealt with topics such as Barry Bonds winning his seventh National League Most Valuable Player award, and New York City's bid to host the 2012 Summer Olympics. Thompson and Holmes went back-and-forth with banter that pushed sarcastic boundaries most of the time. Both were praised by the judges for entertaining them, and Jaffe remarked about the 3 p.m. (Eastern Standard Time) slot being a "big hole", and that they should start a new show called The Grant and David Show featuring the two. Scott said it was the most he'd ever been entertained on the program in its two seasons of existence.

The next game was a trivia game called "The Rundown." The game consisted of six categories, each containing three questions, all of which increased in difficulty in each category. All questions in the game were worth one point apiece. One player was told to pick a category, and only he could answer the first question as soon as it was given. If he got it right, then he got first chance to answer the next question. If he got it wrong, then the second player would be given the opportunity to correctly answer the question, and if he got it right, then the right to exclusively answer each question first would switch to him. If they both got it wrong, then the contestant who gave the last correct answer would be given first chance to answer the next question or told to pick a new category. Thompson soundly defeated Holmes in this game by a score of 10–3.

Then came the season's final "My SportsCenter" segment. Thompson and Holmes would be paired up with real SportsCenter anchors and perform tasks exactly like the sports news show's anchors perform daily. Both pairs would read highlights and stories, while each contestant would have extra pressure placed on them to see how they performed under difficult circumstances, such as the TelePrompter failing while they were reading a story, or doing a highlight while having a producer read tell them what they were seeing through their IFB. Thompson and Holmes were also told just minutes before their segment that they would be interviewing the New England Patriots' Willie McGinest. Holmes was paired up with Steve Levy, while Thompson was paired up with Dream Job season one winner Mike Hall. Both pairs were praised for having good chemistry, while Holmes garnered the most praise for being almost flawless, but Thompson stumbled badly during his segment, and, as the voting would show, gave away the title.

=== Voting ===
Judge	Contestant voted on
American viewing public	Thompson
Woody Paige	Holmes
Kit Hoover	Thompson
Stephen A. Smith	Thompson
Al Jaffe	Not needed*

David Holmes won season 2 of Dream Job.

Later on SportsCenter that night, Holmes was given trivia questions to try to see how much money he would make in his first year as an ESPN employee. He started out at $60,000, with each correct answer being worth $5,000 apiece. He got as high as the $75,000 question, which he got wrong, bumping his first-year salary back to $70,000. Holmes was also awarded with a brand-new Mazda 6 5-door car.

(*)The asterisk is placed next to Jaffe because America's vote was read before the judges' votes were given, so when Smith said he voted to cut Thompson, Scott said, "We don't need to go on", and Thompson was immediately sent off, but not before hugging Holmes. Scott eventually turned to Jaffe, who said that if his vote had been necessary, he would also have cut Thompson.
