= Lake Middle/High School =

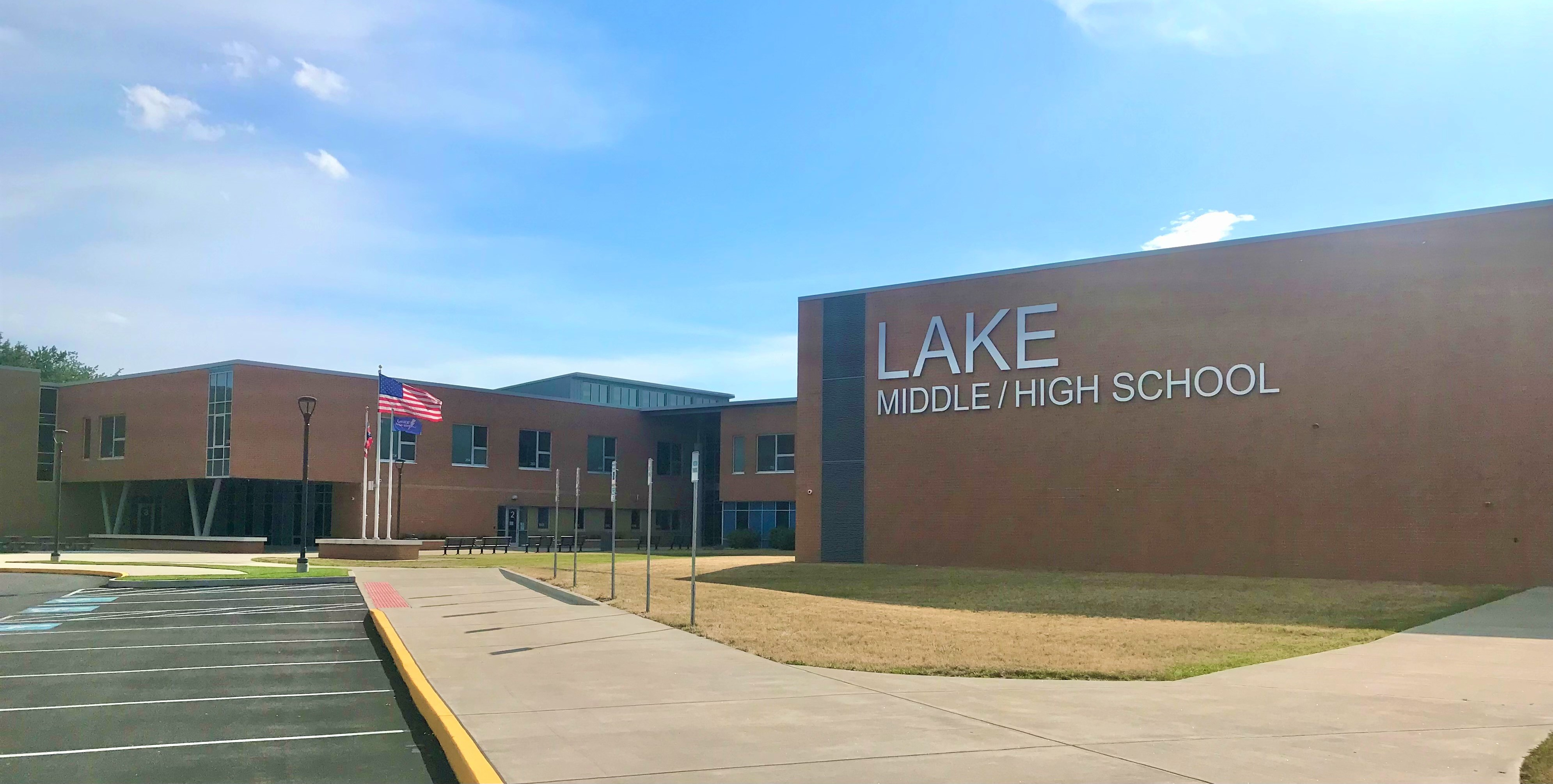
- Lake High School

Location
- 709 Market Avenue SW; Uniontown, Ohio 44685; United States
- Coordinates: 40°57′34.59″N 81°21′36.25″W

Information
- Type: Public
- School district: Lake Local School District
- Principal: Dan Harold
- Grades: 7–12
- Enrollment: 1,655 (2024–2025)
- Colors: Blue, red, and white
- Athletics conference: Federal League
- Nickname: Blue Streaks
- Website: lmhs.lakelocal.org

Lake Middle/High School is a public secondary school in Hartville, Ohio, that serves students in grades 7 through 12. It is the only secondary school in the Lake Local School District. Lake's sports teams are nicknamed the Blue Streaks and are a part of the Federal League.

== Athletics ==
=== State championships ===
- Girls softball — 2005

== Notable alumni ==
- Marcus Christopher, Olympic freestyle BMX rider
- Dan Goodspeed, professional football player in the Canadian Football League
- David Holmes, winner of ESPN's Dream Job
- Jameson Konz, professional football player in the National Football League (NFL)
- Chandler Vaudrin, professional basketball player in the NBA G League
