= Lake Local School District =

Lake Local School District may refer to:

- Lake Local School District (Stark County), Stark County, Ohio
- Lake Local School District (Wood County), Wood County, Ohio
