= Jameson Konz =

American football player (born 1986)

No. 46
- Position: Tight end

Personal information
- Born: July 2, 1986 (age 40); Canton, Ohio, U.S.
- Listed height: 6 ft 4 in (1.93 m)
- Listed weight: 254 lb (115 kg)

Career information
- High school: Lake (Uniontown, Ohio)
- College: Kent State
- NFL draft: 2010: 7th round, 245th overall pick

Career history
- Seattle Seahawks (2010−2011); Seattle Seahawks (2013)*; Dallas Cowboys (2013)*; Denver Broncos (2014)*
- * Offseason or practice squad member only

Career NFL statistics
- Total tackles: 1
- Stats at Pro Football Reference

Jameson Konz (born July 2, 1986) is an American former professional football player who was a tight end, linebacker, and defensive end for three National Football League (NFL) teams — the Seattle Seahawks, Dallas Cowboys, and Denver Broncos. His career was set back by numerous injuries which impacted and ultimately curtailed his time in the league.

Konz was selected with the 245th overall pick in the 7th round of the 2010 NFL draft by the Seahawks, originally as a wide receiver. He played college football at Kent State, playing multiple positions on both defense and offense throughout his college career.

Despite not being invited to the NFL Combine, Konz attracted the attention of NFL teams after his pro day workout at Kent State when he posted some of the best measurables of any player in that year's draft. Konz ran the 40 yard dash in 4.38 seconds on his second attempt, made a 10'-8" broad jump, and performed a 46" vertical jump. He later completed 27 reps of 225 pounds on the bench press during a pre-draft workout for the New Orleans Saints.

== Professional career ==
=== Seattle Seahawks ===
After spending the 2010 NFL season on injured reserve due to a hip injury suffered in training camp, Konz began the 2011 training camp playing tight end. After numerous injuries to several Seahawks' defensive linemen early on in training camp, the Seattle Seahawks under head coach Pete Carroll switched Konz to play on defense as a blitzing LEO defensive end and linebacker in practice, as Seahawks' coaches were impressed by his ability to put pressure on the quarterback.

In the first pre-season game of 2011 versus the San Diego Chargers, Konz saw action at defensive end and recorded a sack in the 4th quarter on quarterback Scott Tolzien as the Chargers were attempting a late comeback.

Konz was released on the final roster cut down on September 3, 2011, but then re-signed to the Seahawks practice squad the following day as he was highly valued by the team for his versatility and ability to play multiple positions.

Konz was signed to a new contract when he was added to the Seahawks active roster on October 4, 2011. He was on the active 46 player game day roster starting on special teams, and recorded a tackle during the Seahawks 36–25 win over the New York Giants on October 9, 2011, at Giants' Met Life Stadium. In that same game following a late 4th quarter interception return for a touchdown by Brandon Browner from a pass by Eli Manning, Konz tore the anterior cruciate ligament (ACL) while covering the subsequent kickoff.

Konz was subsequently placed on the season ending injured reserve list the following week, and underwent successful surgery on his knee on October 25, 2011, in Seattle. He remained out of the league during the 2012 season as he worked on rehabilitating his knee.

In April 2013 just prior to the NFL draft, Konz participated in 3 day voluntary minicamp as a non-roster invitee with the NFL's Jacksonville Jaguars under new head coach Gus Bradley, who was previously the defensive coordinator in Seattle.

On July 30, 2013, Konz was signed to the 90 man roster by the Seattle Seahawks, and was switched back to offense at tight end during training camp and preseason games. After spending time working out in Southern California during the offseason, Konz showed up to camp having added 20 pounds of bulk from his original 234 pounds when he was drafted in 2010.

On August 26, 2013, Konz was released by the Seahawks, but then re-signed to the practice squad on September 5, 2013.

Konz was released from the Seahawks practice squad on October 1, 2013.

=== Dallas Cowboys ===
On December 4, 2013, Konz signed with the Dallas Cowboys practice squad and stayed with the team to finish the 2013 season. On December 30, the Cowboys chose to not sign Konz to a futures contract, making him a free agent.

=== Denver Broncos ===
Konz, along with seven other players, were signed to future contracts with the Denver Broncos on January 22, 2014. He reached 4th on the depth chart at tight end early on during the preseason before suffering a neck injury, and was subsequently released by the Broncos.
