= Dan Goodspeed =

American football player (born 1977)

No. 64
- Position: Offensive tackle

Personal information
- Born: May 20, 1977 (age 49); Cleveland, Ohio, U.S.
- Listed height: 6 ft 6 in (1.98 m)
- Listed weight: 313 lb (142 kg)

Career information
- High school: Lake
- College: Kent State

Career history
- 2000: San Francisco 49ers*
- 2001: Orlando Rage
- 2001: San Francisco 49ers
- 2001: New York Jets
- 2002: Tampa Bay Buccaneers
- 2004: Miami Dolphins*
- 2004: Washington Redskins
- 2005: Washington Redskins*
- 2005–2008: Winnipeg Blue Bombers
- 2010–2012: Saskatchewan Roughriders
- * Offseason or practice squad member only

Awards and highlights
- Super Bowl champion (XXXVII); Leo Dandurand Trophy (2007); 3× CFL All-Star (2007–2009); 3× CFL East All-Star (2007–2009)
- Stats at CFL.ca (archive)

Dan Goodspeed (born May 20, 1977) is an American former professional football offensive tackle who played in the Canadian Football League (CFL). He also played in the XFL.

== College career ==
Goodspeed played college football at Walsh University and Kent State University, having previously attended Lake High School in Uniontown, Ohio.
