= Zachariah Selwyn =

American singer-songwriter, actor, host, and writer

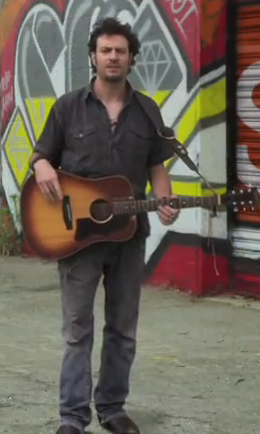
- Selwyn in 2009

Background information
- Years active: 2003–present

Zachariah "Zach" Selwyn (born April 23, 1975), also known as simply Zachariah, is an American singer-songwriter, actor, host and writer best known for hosting the series America's Secret Slang, Guinness World Records Gone Wild!, Attack of the Show! and Catch It Keep It. He also appeared as a contestant on the ESPN reality show Dream Job.

== Early career and Dream Job ==
Selwyn released country-rock CD Ghost Signs in 2003. He recorded three songs with pop singer and The Black Eyed Peas member Fergie from 2001 – 2002. Two of those songs, "Will The Ink Fade" and "No Place at All (Baby I'm a Drifter)" appear on the CD. The other song, "Other Side" is on the C.I.L.F. EP from 2006.

Selwyn beat a potential crowd of over 20,000 and appeared on the first season of ESPN's reality show Dream Job. Selwyn debuted on the second episode on February 29, 2004. While reading a "Top Ten" highlights segment on ESPN's SportsCenter he sported long hair, a beard and a 70s Outlaw country western leisure suit. ESPN Vice-president of Talent, show judge Al Jaffe told him he was not credible because of his appearance. Selwyn cleaned up in time for episode three. He finished third.

== Post-Dream Job career ==
He appeared on "Pardon the Interruption" in June 2004 and read viewer mail.

Selwyn appeared as the backwoods country-rap singing gas station attendant Randall Keith Randall in the film Dead and Breakfast released in 2005.

Beginning on June 15, 2004, Selwyn debuted as a color commentator on the Game Show Network series Extreme Dodgeball. He also returned to ESPN, guest-hosting Around the Horn a week before Extreme Dodgeball debuted. Selwyn shot an un-aired ESPN2 pilot called Holla Back in September 2005 with former BET host Free that was not picked up by the network.

On April 17, 2006, Selwyn became a correspondent on G4's Attack of the Show!. He wrote and starred in numerous comedic sketches. He also did a pilot for Bravo called This Evening With These People.

Selwyn played in a Los Angeles-based band called Zachariah and the Lobos Riders, who, after Dead and Breakfast, performed their song "I Ain't Gonna Do (Walk Away)" on Attack of the Show!, on July 13, 2006. Selwyn has written and performed jingles for commercials for Coors beer. He also made guest appearances on Kickin' it, Chicago Hope, Sabrina, the Teenage Witch "Stargate: Atlantis" and That '70s Show.

Selwyn released his first EP in 2006 titled Cartoons I'd Like to F***, which featured a new single with Fergie called "Other Side".

He was named one of the "Heeb 100" by Heeb Magazine in September 2007.

He released a record called Alcoholiday in 2007.

He was on G4 TV's appearance at the AEE (Adult Entertainment Expo), where he performed as "Reggie Cupid" in the "Cupid University of Movie Making" sketch.

In May 2007 he appeared as a guest host for the internet video game show Epileptic Gaming. In July 2007 he served as floor reporter for G4's coverage of the three-day event E3, the Electronic Entertainment Expo.

He performed his song "I Wanna be a Lawnmower (Cause They're Always on Grass)" on Attack of the Show! on September 10, 2007.

His song "I'm in Edukashun" was specifically written and composed for the 2008 film Lower Learning. He appeared as "Buck" in the 2009 film Tenure alongside Luke Wilson and David Koechner.

He appeared in a Budweiser commercial during the 2009 Super Bowl (the one where the Horse fetches the tree).

== 2009 ==
He hosted the series Fanarchy, which debuted on Versus on June 7.

He began hosting the series Catch It Keep It with Mike Senese, which appears on The Science Channel.

He appeared in a pilot episode of the American version of the Argentinian humor series Caiga Quien Caiga with Dominic Monaghan and Greg Giraldo; the show was not picked up.

He wrote a rap song to promote the third season of ABC Family's Greek, and shot a music video with the cast.

== Later ==
He and his brother Jesse Selwyn had hit viral comedy music videos "White People Problems", "Chick Drinks", "Porky Piggin it" and "Hello, Beautiful Homeless Girl" for Atom TV on Comedy Central).

In 2010, the Selwyn brothers wrote, directed, starred in and produced the "Stand Up 2 Cancer" music video with actor Jim Parsons of The Big Bang Theory called "Up 2 You."

In September 2010, he appeared in a promo for Conan O'Brien's new show Conan. He appeared in commercials for Bud Light, Cellular South, KFC, Pennzoil and Ally Financial.

He had a recurring role on Greek and Glory Daze on TBS.

In 2011, he began hosting the special America's Secret Slang for the History Channel.

In 2013, he became the comedic play-by-play host of Guinness World Records Gone Wild for truTV.

In 2016, his music was featured throughout mockumentary Trailer Park Boys season 6, featured on Netflix.

In 2016, he began working as Senior Creative Content Producer for the TBS network. He oversees/produces and writes sketches and web series.

== CD releases ==
- Zachariah (2001) – Currently available digitally
- Ghost Signs (2003) – 11 song LP
- Dead and Breakfast Soundtrack (2005) – 10 song LP
- Alcoholiday (2007) – 14 song LP
- Spent Casings (2008) – 11 song B-sides LP
- Pluck Yer Twanger (2010) – "New Wave Dynamics" – 14 song comedy CD
- Moose Knuckle (2012) – 13 song Comedy LP

EP's

- Cartoons I'd Like to F*** (2006) 5 song EP
- High Wasted (2010) 7 song Comedy EP
- "Skywriting" (2014) - 13 song LP
- "Nirvana T-Shirt" (2015) - Single
- "Ballad of a Brakeman" (2015) - Single
- "Dong on the Whiteboard" (2016) - Single

=== Other appearances ===
- "We Outta La Croix" (2016) - TBS Digital Comedy video
- Blue Meridian Minerva (2003) – Guest artist on "Spreading Clever"
- Smooth-E Kosher Kuts – Hungry for More (2006) – Guest artist "Bar Mitzvah DJ's"
- Executive Producer of Bobby Joyner and the Sundowners CD Skies of Blue, Fields of Green (2005)
