= Lake High School =

Lake High School may refer to:

- Lake High School (Millbury, Ohio), a public high school
- Lake Middle/High School, a public high school in Uniontown, Ohio
