= Dan Cortese =

American actor (born 1967)

- Born: Daniel James Cortese; September 14, 1967 (age 59); Sewickley, Pennsylvania, U.S.
- Education: University of North Carolina at Chapel Hill
- Occupation: Actor
- Years active: 1988–present
- Spouse(s): Dee Dee Hemby (m. 1994; div. 2012) Carolina Londono (m. 2014)
- Children: 4

Daniel James Cortese (/kɔːrˈtɛz/; born September 14, 1967) is an American actor. He played Perry Rollins on Veronica's Closet and Vic Meladeo on What I Like About You.

== Early life and education ==
Of Italian (Calabrese) descent, Cortese was born on September 14, 1967, in Sewickley, Pennsylvania, and graduated from Quaker Valley High School in Leetsdale, where he played football and basketball. Before becoming an actor, Cortese played college football at the University of North Carolina as a backup quarterback. In his freshman year in 1986, the Tar Heels went to the Aloha Bowl in Hawaii. Cortese graduated from the University of North Carolina at Chapel Hill with a Bachelor of Arts degree in broadcasting in 1990.

== Career ==
Cortese hosted MTV Sports from 1992 to 1997. He was also the player/coach of The Bricklayers and The Homeboys for the MTV Rock N' Jock games. Cortese was Burger King's official spokesperson during its "Your Way, Right Away" ad campaign in the 1990s. He appeared in over 90 national and regional commercials.

In 1993, Cortese made two separate cameos (Taco Bell lounge singer and Cryo Prison guard) in the Sylvester Stallone film Demolition Man. Also in 1993, he landed the lead role in NBC's remake of Route 66. In 1994, he co-starred in the CBS police drama Traps with George C. Scott. In 1995 he played Jake Hanson's half-brother Jess Hanson in Melrose Place for eight episodes in the third season but was killed off in the season's cliffhanger finale. In 1996, Cortese starred as Jason in the NBC TV movie The Lottery. Also in 1996, he starred in the feature film Weekend In The Country with Jack Lemmon, as well as the HBO film Public Enemies.

Cortese appeared on the NBC sitcom Seinfeld. He played Tony, the ultra-cool, good-looking, rock-climbing boyfriend of Elaine Benes (Julia Louis-Dreyfus) in the episode "The Stall". Tony was dubbed a "mimbo" (a male bimbo) by Jerry. During rehearsals, Cortese improvised the line "Step off", which became the catchphrase that Larry David insisted be used for the episode.

From 1997 to 2000, Cortese starred with Kirstie Alley in Veronica's Closet. In 2000, he starred with Brooke Shields in the feature film After Sex. Cortese followed that up in 2001 with the TBS film The Triangle with Luke Perry. In 2003, he starred in the sitcom Rock Me Baby.

From 2002 to 2003, Cortese also had a recurring role in the first season of The WB sitcom What I Like About You as Vic Maledeo, the boss of Val Tyler (Jennie Garth). He reprised the role as a series regular from 2005 to 2006 in the fourth and final season. He also directed the episode "The Other Woman" that season. In 2004, he appeared in two episodes of the third season of the ABC sitcom 8 Simple Rules as Scott McCallister, a tennis coach briefly caught in a love triangle with his player Bridget Hennessy (Kaley Cuoco) and her mother Cate Hennessy (Katey Sagal). Also in 2004, he starred in the SyFy film Locusts: The 8th Plague.

In 2008, producer Mark Burnett hired Cortese to host My Dad Is Better than Your Dad for NBC. Cortese also appeared in the eight-episode ABC special The Superstars.

In 2008, Cortese co-starred with Emily Osment in the feature film Soccer Mom as Lorenzo Vincenzo, a world-famous Italian soccer player.

He co-hosted the ABC game show Crash Course in 2009. Also in 2009, he co-starred with Bob Saget in the sitcom Surviving Suburbia. In 2010, Cortese hosted VH-1's weight loss competition Money Hungry.

In 2012, Cortese guest-starred in the Hot in Cleveland episode (#3.8) "God and Football" as Jimmy Armstrong, a professional football player.

From 2013 to 2014, Cortese hosted truTV's Guinness World Records Unleashed. In 2015, he starred in the feature film Changing Seasons. In 2019, he performed on the TBS show Drop The Mic.

== Filmography ==
Film
Year	Title	Role	Notes
1993	Demolition Man	Taco Bell Entertainer/Cryolab Technician	
1995	At First Sight (Two Guys Talkin' About Girls)	Joey Fornone	
1996	The Lottery	Jason Smith	
2000	After Sex	John	
2005	Locusts: The 8th Plague	Colt Denton	
2007	Everybody Wants to Be Italian	Michael	
2008	Soccer Mom	Lorenzo Vincenzo	

Television
Year	Title	Role	Notes
1993	Route 66 (reboot)	Arthur Clark	full season (four episodes)
1994	Seinfeld	Tony	Episode: "The Stall"
1994	Traps	Detective Chris Trapchek	full season (six episodes)
1995	Melrose Place	Jess Hanson	9 episodes
1996	Caroline in the City	Scott	1 episode
1997	The Single Guy	Dan Montgomery	
1997	Volcano: Fire on the Mountain	Peter Slater	
2000	Baby Blues	Ray	
2000	That's Life	Professor Jeff Cahill	
1997–2000	Veronica's Closet	Perry Rollins / Laird Perry Rollins	
2001	The Triangle	Tommy Devane	
2001	Inside Schwartz	Chuck	
2002	House Blend	Dave Reed	Unsold television pilot
2002	Andy Richter Controls the Universe	Ben / Peter	
2003–2004	Rock Me Baby	Jimmy Cox	
2004	8 Simple Rules	Coach Scott McCallister	
2004	CSI: Miami	Sal Coleman	
2005	Joey	Chuck	(TV series, 1 episode: "Joey and the Stuntman")
2003, 2005–2006	What I Like About You	Vic Meladeo (Season 1 guest, Season 4 Main)	
2009	Surviving Suburbia	Onno	
2010	Castle	Howard Weisberg	
2010	Money Hungry	Host	
2011	Man Up!	Dennis Mayder	
2012	Hot in Cleveland	Jimmy Armstrong	(TV series, 1 episode: "God and Football")
2013–2014	Guinness World Records Gone Wild	Host	
2016	The Tomorrow Show	Himself	
2019	Beach Bake Battle	Host	
2021	Leverage: Redemption	Ryan Corbett	"The Panamanian Monkeys Job" Season 1, Episode 2 (Jul 9, 2021)
2023	The Curse	'Love to the Third Degree' host	(TV series, 1 episode: "Land of Enchantmen") Season 1, Episode 1 (Nov 10, 2023)
