= Stuart Scott =

American sportscaster and anchor (1965–2015)

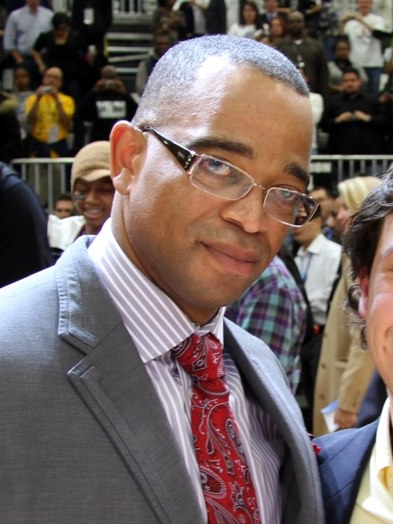
- Scott in 2010
- Born: Stuart Orlando Scott; July 19, 1965; Chicago, Illinois, U.S.
- Died: January 4, 2015 (aged 49); Avon, Connecticut, U.S.
- Resting place: Raleigh Memorial Park, Raleigh, North Carolina, U.S.
- Education: University of North Carolina at Chapel Hill
- Occupation: Sportscaster
- Years active: 1987–2014
- Spouse: Kimberly Scott (m. 1993; div. 2007)
- Children: 2

Stuart Orlando Scott (July 19, 1965 – January 4, 2015) was an American sportscaster and anchor on ESPN, including on SportsCenter. Known for his hip-hop style and use of catchphrases, Scott was also a regular for the network in its National Basketball Association (NBA) and National Football League (NFL) coverage.

Scott was born in Chicago and resided in the back of London Towne Houses on Chicago's Southeast side. After relocating to North Carolina in his youth, Scott graduated from the University of North Carolina at Chapel Hill. He began his career with various local television stations before joining ESPN in 1993. Although there were already accomplished African-American sportscasters, his blending of hip hop with sportscasting was unique for television. By 2008, Scott was a staple in ESPN's programming, and also began on ABC as lead host for their coverage of the NBA.

In 2007, Scott had an appendectomy and learned that his appendix was cancerous. After going into remission, he was again diagnosed with cancer in 2011 and 2013. Scott was honored at the ESPY Awards in 2014 with the Jimmy V Award for his fight against cancer.

== Early life ==
Stuart Orlando Scott was born in Chicago, Illinois on July 19, 1965. His parents were O. Ray and Jacqueline Scott. At age seven, Scott and his family moved to Winston-Salem, North Carolina. Scott had three siblings: Stephen, Susan, and Synthia.

Scott attended Mount Tabor High School for ninth and tenth grade and then completed his last two years at Richard J. Reynolds High School in Winston-Salem, graduating in 1983. In high school, Scott was a captain of his football team, ran track, served as Vice President of the Student Council, and was the Sergeant at Arms of the school's Key Club. During high school, Scott was diagnosed with keratoconus, a degenerative eye condition that causes thinning and distortion of the cornea. The condition affected his vision and limited his ability to pursue football beyond the high school level, though he remained active in sports. Scott was inducted into the Richard J. Reynolds High School Hall of Fame during a ceremony on February 6, 2015, which took place during the Reynolds/Mt. Tabor (the two high schools that Scott attended) basketball game.

Scott attended the University of North Carolina at Chapel Hill, where he was a member of the Mu Zeta Chapter of Alpha Phi Alpha fraternity and was part of the on-air talent at WXYC. While at UNC, Scott also played wide receiver and defensive back on the club football team. In 1987, Scott graduated from the UNC with a B.A. in speech communication. In 2001, he gave the commencement address at UNC.

== Early career ==
Following graduation, Scott worked as a news reporter and weekend sports anchor at WPDE-TV in Florence, South Carolina from 1987 until 1988. He came up with the phrase "as cool as the other side of the pillow" while working his first job at WPDE. After this, Scott worked as a news reporter at WRAL-TV 5 in Raleigh, North Carolina from 1988 until 1990. WRAL Sports anchor Jeff Gravley recalled that there was a "natural bond" between Scott and the sports department. Gravley described his style as creative, gregarious, and adding so much energy to the newsroom. Even after leaving, Scott still visited his former colleagues at WRAL and treated them like family.

From 1990 until 1993, Scott worked at WESH, an NBC affiliate in Orlando, Florida as a sports reporter and sports anchor. While at WESH, he met ESPN producer Gus Ramsey, who was beginning his own career. Ramsey said of Scott: "You knew the second he walked in the door that it was a pit stop, and that he was gonna be this big star somewhere someday. He went out and did a piece on the rodeo, and he nailed it just like he would nail the NBA Finals for ESPN." Scott earned first place honors from the Central Florida Press Club for a feature on rodeo.

== ESPN ==
Al Jaffe, ESPN's vice president for talent, brought Scott to ESPN2 because they were looking for sportscasters who might appeal to a younger audience. Scott became one of the few African-American personalities who was not a former professional athlete. His first ESPN assignments were for SportsSmash, a short sportscast twice an hour on ESPN2's SportsNight program. After Keith Olbermann left SportsNight for ESPN's SportsCenter, Scott took his place in the anchor chair at SportsNight. After this, Scott was a regular on SportsCenter. At SportsCenter, Scott was frequently teamed with fellow anchors Steve Levy, Kenny Mayne, Dan Patrick, and Rich Eisen. Scott was a regular in the This Is SportsCenter commercials.

In 2002, Scott was named studio host for the NBA on ESPN. He became lead host six years later, when he also began at ABC in the same capacity for its NBA coverage, which included the NBA Finals. Scott also anchored SportsCenter's prime-time coverage from the site of NBA postseason games. From 1997 until 2014, he covered the league's finals. During the 1997 and 1998 NBA Finals, Scott did one-on-one interviews with Michael Jordan. When Monday Night Football moved to ESPN in 2006, he hosted on-site coverage, including Monday Night Countdown and post-game SportsCenter coverage. Scott previously appeared on NFL Primetime during the 1997 season, Monday Night Countdown from 2002 to 2005, and Sunday NFL Countdown from 1999 to 2001. He also covered the MLB playoffs and NCAA Final Four in 1995 for ESPN.

Scott appeared in each issue of ESPN the Magazine, with his Holla column. During his work at ESPN, Scott also interviewed Tiger Woods, Sammy Sosa, President Bill Clinton and President Barack Obama during the 2008 presidential campaign. As a part of the interview with President Barack Obama, Scott played in a one-on-one basketball game with the President. In 2004, per the request of U.S. troops, Scott and fellow SportsCenter co-anchors hosted a week of programs originating from Kuwait for ESPN's SportsCenter: Salute the Troops. He hosted a number of ESPN game and reality shows, including Stump the Schwab, Teammates, and Dream Job, and hosted David Blaine's Drowned Alive special. Scott also hosted a special and only broadcast episode of America's Funniest Home Videos called AFV: The Sports Edition.

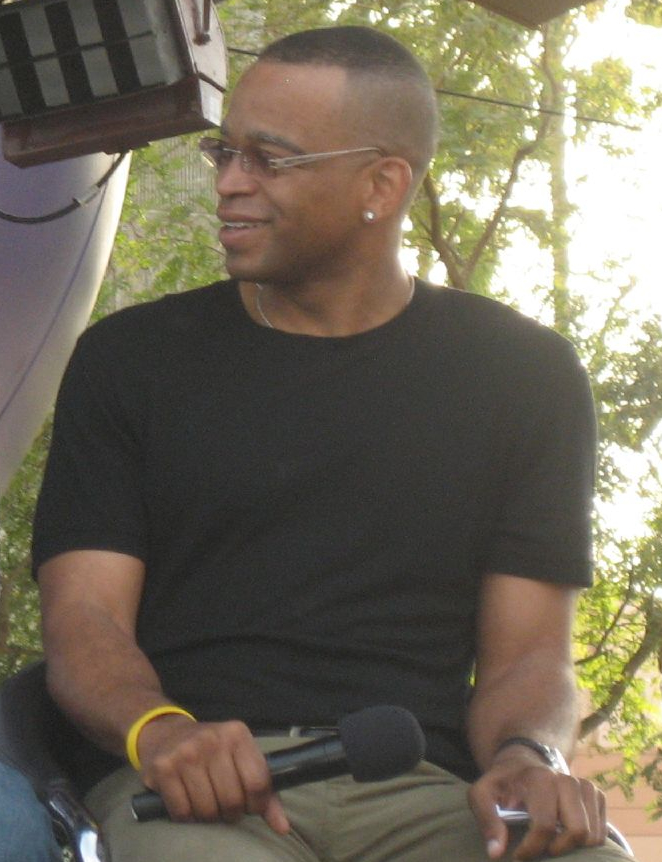
Scott at ESPN The Weekend, 2008

=== Style ===
While there were already successful African-American sportscasters, Scott blended hip-hop culture and sports in a way that had never been seen before on television. He talked in the same manner as fans would at home. ESPN director of news Vince Doria told ABC: "But Stuart spoke a much different language ... that appealed to a young demographic, particularly a young African-American demographic." Michael Wilbon wrote that Scott allowed his personality to infuse the coverage and his emotion to pour out.

Scott also integrated pop culture references into his reports. One commentator remembered his style: "he could go from evoking a Baptist preacher riffing during Sunday morning service ('Can I get a witness from the congregation?!'), to quoting Public Enemy frontman Chuck D ('Hear the drummer get WICKED!') In 1999, he was parodied on Saturday Night Live by Tim Meadows. Scott appeared in music videos with the rappers LL Cool J and Luke, and he was cited in "3 Peat", a Lil Wayne song that included the line: "Yeah, I got game like Stuart Scott, fresh out the ESPN shop." In a 2002 segment of NPR's On the Media, Scott revealed one approach to his anchoring duties: "Writing is better if it's kept simple. Every sentence doesn't need to have perfect noun/verb agreement. I've said 'ain't' on the air. Because I sometimes use 'ain't' when I'm talking."

As a result of his unique style, Scott and ESPN received a lot of hate mail from people who resented his color, his hip-hop style, or his generation. In a 2003 USA Today survey, Scott finished first in the question of which anchor should be voted off SportsCenter, but he also was second to Dan Patrick in the 'definitely keep him' voting. Jason Whitlock criticized Scott's use of Jay-Z's alternate nickname, "Jigga", at halftime of Monday Night Football as ridiculous and offensive. Scott never changed his style and ESPN stuck with him.

=== Catchphrases ===
Scott became well known for his use of catch phrases, following in the SportsCenter tradition begun by Dan Patrick and Keith Olbermann. He popularized the phrase booyah, which spread from sports into mainstream culture. Some of the catchphrases included:

- "Boo-yah!" (According to co-anchor Rich Eisen, Scott actually wrote the phrase as "Boo-yow")
- "Hallah"
- "As cool as the other side of the pillow"
- "He must be the bus driver cuz he was takin' him to school."
- "He must be jelly cause jam don't shake like that!"
- "Holla at a playa when you see him in the street!"
- "Just call him butter 'cause he's on a roll"
- "They call him the Windex Man 'cause he's always cleaning the glass"
- "You ain't gotta go home, but you gotta get the heck outta here."
- "He treats him like a dog. Sit. Stay."
- "And the Lord said you got to rise up!"
- "Make all the kinfolk proud ... Pookie, Ray Ray and Moesha"
- "It's your world, kid ... The rest of us are still paying rent"
- "Can I get a witness from the congregation?"
- "Doing it, doing it, doing it well"
- "See ... What had happened was"

== Personal life ==
Scott was married to Kimberly Scott from 1993 to 2007. They had two daughters: Taelor and Sydni. Scott lived in Avon, Connecticut. At the time of his death, Scott was in a relationship with Kristin Spodobalski. During his Jimmy V Award speech, Scott told his teenage daughters: "Taelor and Sydni, I love you guys more than I will ever be able to express. You two are my heartbeat. I am standing on this stage here tonight because of you." His daughter, Sydni Scott, was named a Rhodes Scholar in 2022.

=== Eye injury ===
Scott was injured when he was hit in the face by a football thrown during a New York Jets mini-camp on April 3, 2002, while filming a special for ESPN, a blow that damaged his cornea. Scott received surgery but afterwards suffered from ptosis, or drooping of the eyelid. The injury compounded earlier vision problems stemming from keratoconus, making his continued on-air work more demanding.

=== Appendectomy and cancer ===
After leaving Connecticut on a Sunday morning in 2007 for Monday Night Football in Pittsburgh, Scott had a stomach ache. After the stomach ache worsened, he went to the hospital instead of the game and later had his appendix removed. After testing the appendix, doctors learned that Scott had cancer. Two days later, he had surgery in New York that removed part of his colon and some of his lymph nodes near the appendix. After the surgery, they recommended preventive chemotherapy. By December, Scott—while undergoing chemotherapy—hosted Friday night ESPN NBA coverage and led the coverage of ABC's NBA Christmas Day studio show. Scott worked out while undergoing chemotherapy. He said of his experience with cancer at the time: "One of the coolest things about having cancer, and I know that sounds like an oxymoron, is meeting other people who've had to fight it. You have a bond. It's like a fraternity or sorority." When Scott returned to work and people knew of his cancer diagnosis, the well-wishers felt overbearing for him as he just wanted to talk about sports, not cancer.

The cancer returned in 2011, but it eventually went back into remission. He was re-diagnosed with cancer on January 14, 2013. After chemotherapy, Scott would do mixed martial arts and/or a P90X workout regimen. By 2014, he had undergone 58 infusions of chemotherapy and switched to chemotherapy pills. Scott also underwent radiation and multiple surgeries as a part of his cancer treatment. Scott never wanted to know what stage of cancer he was in.

=== Jimmy V Award ===
On July 16, 2014, Scott was honored at the ESPY Awards, with the Jimmy V Award for his struggle with cancer, which was his final public appearance before his death. Scott shared that he had had four surgeries in the week prior to his appearance, when he was suffering from liver complications and kidney failure. Scott told the audience, "When you die, it does not mean that you lose to cancer. You beat cancer by how you live, why you live, and in the manner in which you live." At the ESPYs, a video was also shown that included scenes of Scott from a clinic room at Johns Hopkins Hospital and other scenes from Scott's life fighting cancer. Scott ended the speech by calling his daughter up to the stage for a hug, "because I need one," and telling the audience to "have a great rest of your night, have a great rest of your life."

== Death ==
On the morning of January 4, 2015, Scott died of appendiceal cancer in his home in Avon, Connecticut, at age 49. Soon after, his foundation for cancer research was created. Six days later, Scott was laid to rest in Raleigh Memorial Park after a private funeral service at Providence Baptist Church. The public funeral visitation was held the previous evening.

=== Tributes ===
ESPN announced: "Stuart Scott, a dedicated family man and one of ESPN's signature SportsCenter anchors, has died after a courageous and inspiring battle with cancer. He was 49." ESPN released a video obituary of Scott. Sports Illustrated called ESPN's video obituary a beautiful and moving tribute to a man who died "at the too-damn-young age of 49." Barack Obama paid tribute to Scott, saying:

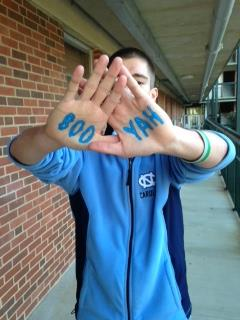
A UNC student featured on ESPN's broadcast of the Notre Dame-UNC basketball game on January 5, 2015, honoring Scott with his trademark "Boo Yah" saying.

I will miss Stuart Scott. Twenty years ago, Stuart helped usher in a new way to talk about our favorite teams and the day's best plays. For much of those twenty years, public service and campaigns have kept me from my family – but wherever I went, I could flip on the TV and Stu and his colleagues on SportsCenter were there. Over the years, he entertained us, and in the end, he inspired us – with courage and love. Michelle and I offer our thoughts and prayers to his family, friends, and colleagues.

A number of National Basketball Association athletes—current and former—paid tribute to Scott, including Stephen Curry, Carmelo Anthony, Kobe Bryant, Steve Nash, Jason Collins, Shaquille O'Neal, Magic Johnson, Dwyane Wade, LeBron James, Michael Jordan, Bruce Bowen, Dennis Rodman, James Worthy and others. A number of golfers paid tribute to Scott: Tiger Woods, Gary Player, David Duval, Lee Westwood, Blair O'Neal, Jane Park and others. Other athletes paid tribute including Robert Griffin III, Russell Wilson, Jon Lester, Lance Armstrong, Barry Sanders, J. J. Watt, David Ortiz and Sheryl Swoopes. UNC basketball coach Roy Williams called him a "hero." Arizona Cardinals head coach Bruce Arians said: "We lost a football game but we lost more this morning. I think one of the best members of the media I've ever dealt with, Stuart Scott, passed away."

Colleagues Hannah Storm and Rich Eisen gave tearful on-air remembrances of Scott on SportsCenter and NFL Network respectively, with Eisen later narrating a package of NFL highlights using his former co-anchor's catchphrases. Also on SportsCenter, Scott Van Pelt and Steve Levy said farewell to Scott and left a chair empty in his honor. Tom Jackson, Cris Carter, Chris Berman, Mike Ditka and Keyshawn Johnson from NFL Countdown shared their memories of Scott.

During Ernie Johnson Jr.'s acceptance speech for his 2015 Sports Emmy Award for Best Studio Host, the TNT and TBS NBA and MLB host gave his award to Scott's daughters, saying it "belongs with Stuart Scott". At the 67th Primetime Emmy Awards and at the 2015 ESPY Awards, Scott was included in the "in memoriam" segment, a rare honor for a sports broadcaster.

On Fox Sports Live on FS1, the broadcast team of Joe Buck, Troy Aikman, Erin Andrews and Chris Myers paid tribute to Stuart Scott from Fox's gamesite. The Fox NFL Sunday crew anchored by Curt Menefee, Terry Bradshaw, Howie Long, Michael Strahan and Jimmy Johnson also paid tribute to Stuart Scott on behalf of Fox Sports, as did Jay Onrait and Dan O'Toole from TSN in Canada.

== Legacy ==
ESPN president John Skipper said Scott's flair and style, which he used to talk about the athletes he was covering, "changed everything." Fellow ESPN Anchor, Stan Verrett, said he was a trailblazer: "not only because he was black – obviously black – but because of his style, his demeanor, his presentation. He did not shy away from the fact that he was a black man, and that allowed the rest of us who came along to just be ourselves." Scott became a role model for African-American sports journalists. ESPN designated December 4 as 'Stuart Scott Day.'

=== Cancer advocacy and fundraising event ===
Following Scott's death, the V Foundation for Cancer Research established the Stuart Scott Memorial Cancer Research Fund. The fund supports cancer research with an emphasis on health equity and increasing representation among researchers. Annual "Boo-Yah! A Celebration of Stuart Scott" fundraising events, held primarily in New York City, have raised millions of dollars for cancer research. These events coincide with ESPN's V Week for Cancer Research and honor Scott.

=== Documentary film ===
In 2025, ESPN Films released 30 for 30: Boo-Yah: A Portrait of Stuart Scott. Directed by Andre Gaines, the documentary features previously unseen archival footage, including Scott's personal home videos, and interviews from family members, colleagues, and athletes. The film examines Scott's broadcasting career, his cultural influence, his health challenges and his legacy in sports media.

== Filmography ==
=== Film ===
- He Got Game (1998)
- Disney's The Kid (2000)
- Drumline (2002)
- Love Don't Cost A Thing (2003)
- Mr. 3000 (2004)
- Herbie: Fully Loaded (2005)
- The Game Plan (2007)
- Enchanted (2007)
- Just Wright (2010)

=== Television ===
- The Chris Rock Show (1997)
- Arli$$ (2000)
- I Love the '80s (2002)
- Soul Food (2003)
- She Spies (2005)
- I Love the '70s (2003)
- One on One (2004)
- Stump the Schwab (2004–06)
- Dream Job (2004)
- Teammates (2005)
- I Love the '90s (2004)
- I Love the Holidays (2005)
- I Love Toys (2006)
- Black to the Future (2009)

== Publications ==
- Scott, Stuart; Platt, Larry (2015). Every Day I Fight. Blue Rider Press. ISBN 978-0-399-17406-3.
