= Guinness World Records Gone Wild =

American reality television series

- Also known as: Guinness World Records Unleashed
- Genre: Reality
- Presented by: Dan Cortese
- Country of origin: United States
- Original language: English
- No. of seasons: 2
- No. of episodes: 16

Production
- Executive producers: Jim Berger; Burt Kearns; Fred Birckhead; Rob Molloy
- Running time: 40 to 43 minutes
- Production company: High Noon Entertainment

Original release
- Network: truTV
- Release: February 7, 2013 – February 6, 2014

Guinness World Records Gone Wild, also known as Guinness World Records Unleashed, is an American reality television series on truTV. The series debuted on February 7, 2013 and is hosted by Dan Cortese. The series' first season averaged more than 1.3 million viewers and ranked as one of ad-supported cable's Top 3 programs in the Thursday 8 p.m. timeslot with key adult and male demos. It was also cable's No.1 unscripted entertainment program in the timeslot with men 18-49 and adults 18-34. It was announced in April 2013 that truTV has ordered an additional ten episodes. Season 2 premiered on November 7, 2013, and features a title change to Guinness World Records Unleashed.

== Premise ==
The series features average citizens who attempt breaking records which could allow them to be in the Guinness Book of World Records. Stuart Claxton, Liz Smith and Zach Selwyn are recurring cast members in the series. Claxton is the primary Guinness World Records adjudicator for the series, Smith also works with Guinness World Records and Selwyn will provide commentary. Each stunt is performed in front of a live studio audience.

== Episodes ==
=== Series overview ===
Season	Episodes	Originally released	
Season	Episodes	First released	Last released
1	6	February 7, 2013	March 14, 2013
2	10	November 7, 2013	February 6, 2014

=== Season 1 (2013) ===
No. overall	No. in season	Title	Original release date	U.S. viewers (millions)
1	1	"Leaps and Bounds"	February 7, 2013	1.38
Record attempts include candle swallowing, collision avoidance, Rubik's Cube attempt, trampoline jump with fluorescent light tubes, and hammering with the head.
2	2	"A Big Splash"	February 14, 2013	1.10
Record attempts include a watermelon slicing team, live cockroach swallowing, arrow catching blindfolded, and a diving attempt from forty feet into a small one-foot wading pool.
3	3	"It's A Smash"	February 21, 2013	1.23
Record attempts include a 50 meter dash blindfolded, most self headkicks, destroying the most iceblocks solely by human strength, slicing potatoes with a shovel within a minute, most sausages swallowed in a minute, and most skips of a rope in a minute bouncing off the buttocks.
4	4	"Viva!"	February 28, 2013	1.26
Record attempts include crushing watermelons solely using the skull, most quarters fit in a nostril, most can pop tops in a minute ripped from the can using teeth, most burst hot water bottles using just breath in a minute, and fastest traverse of a greased pole.
5	5	"Taking the Plunge"	March 7, 2013	1.17
6	6	"Shattered!"	March 14, 2013	0.82

=== Season 2 (2013–14) ===
No. overall	No. in season	Title	Original release date	U.S. viewers (millions)
7	1	"Bungee Breakfast"	November 7, 2013	1.05
8	2	"Fighting a Jet"	November 14, 2013	0.83
9	3	"Ramped Up"	November 21, 2013	N/A
10	4	"Bouncing Back"	December 5, 2013	N/A
11	5	"Blast Off!"	December 12, 2013	N/A
12	6	"One Giant Leap"	December 19, 2013	N/A
13	7	"The Blob"	January 2, 2014	N/A
14	8	"Hanging Tough"	January 9, 2014	N/A
15	9	"Flipper"	January 16, 2014	N/A
16	10	"Thrown for a Loop"	January 23, 2014	N/A
17	11	"Episode 11"	January 30, 2014	N/A
18	12	"Wet Suited"	February 6, 2014	N/A
