= Howie Schwab =

American television personality (1960–2024)

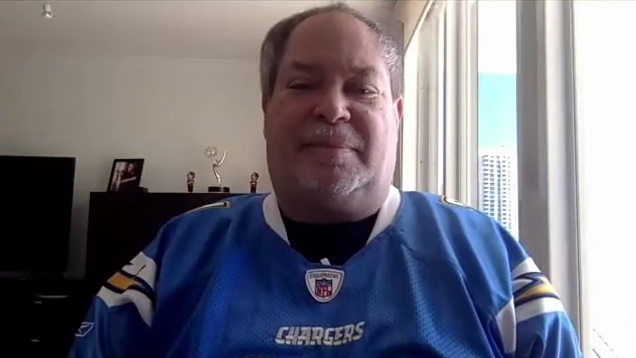
- Schwab in 2020
- Born: Howard Arlen Schwab; September 17, 1960; New York City, U.S.
- Died: April 20, 2024 (aged 63); Aventura, Florida, U.S.
- Education: St. John's University
- Occupations: Television personality; producer; researcher
- Employer: ESPN (1987–2013)
- Known for: Stump the Schwab
- Spouses: Jodi Singer (died 2014); Suzie Davie

Howard Arlen Schwab (September 17, 1960 – April 20, 2024) was an American television personality and sports researcher who worked for ESPN in various roles from 1987 to 2013. Known for his extensive knowledge of sports trivia, he was the final adversary on the network's game show Stump the Schwab (2004–2006), in which contestants tested their knowledge against his; Schwab estimated that he was victorious about 80% of the time. As a geek and non-athlete, The Athletic credited him with breaking the stereotype of people seen on sports television.

== Early life ==
Howard Arlen Schwab was born in Brooklyn, New York City, on September 17, 1960. His father was a Holocaust survivor from Germany.

Schwab grew up in Baldwin, New York, and took an intense interest in sports from childhood. A 1982 graduate of St. John's University, Schwab served as the editor-in-chief of College & Pro Football News Weekly in the mid-1980s before joining ESPN in 1987 as a researcher.

== Career ==
By 1995, Schwab was the coordinating producer for ESPN's website. Beginning in 1998, Schwab served as a coordinating producer for ESPN studio production, which entailed duties on programs including SportsCenter and Outside the Lines. Schwab also served as the resident Couch Potato on ESPN's First Take, on which he discussed and evaluated the top sports TV programming with a 1–5 bags of chips rating system. Schwab also appeared with Merril Hoge and Matthew Berry on ESPNEWS Fantasy Insider.

Schwab appeared on the sports trivia show Stump the Schwab, which ran from 2004 to 2006. During the show, Schwab faced off against sports fans in a trivia contest. Schwab said that he had a 64–16 record during the show's 80 episodes.

As part of cost-cutting efforts, Schwab was released from ESPN in June 2013. In 2014, Schwab joined Sports Jeopardy! as a consultant and writer. He also worked regularly with Dick Vitale for several years afterward. He also worked for Fox Sports after his tenure at ESPN.

== Personal life and death ==
Schwab was married twice; his first wife, Jodi Singer, died in 2014, and he later married Suzie Davie.

After a period of declining health, Schwab died from a heart attack at a hospital in Aventura, Florida, on April 20, 2024, at the age of 63.
