= Catch It Keep It =

American game show and reality TV series

- Genre: Game show Reality; Science; Engineering
- Presented by: Zach Selwyn; Mike Senese
- Theme music composer: Zach Selwyn
- Opening theme: "Catch It Keep It"
- Country of origin: United States
- Original language: English
- No. of seasons: 1
- No. of episodes: 10

Production
- Production companies: True Entertainment; Science Channel

Original release
- Network: Science Channel
- Release: July 17 – September 18, 2009

Catch It Keep It is an American game show and reality television television series hosted by Zach Selwyn and Mike Senese. It was broadcast on the Science Channel and premiered on July 17, 2009. In each episode a three-member team had 48 hours to build a contraption that would save their prize from destruction.

== Premise ==
At the beginning of the competition, Mike Senese, the "Engineer of Destruction", demonstrated how he would attempt to destroy the prize. The team was then given one hour to plan before spending the remaining time on construction. At checkpoints before the deadline, the design's integrity could be tested. The team won if the contraption passed all tests and prevented Senese from destroying the prize.

On some episodes, Senese would work concurrently on his own design to save the prize, typically using a different approach than the team. If the team failed the prize would be set up again for Senese to attempt his method. However, if Senese's design also failed, the prize was awarded to the team.

== See also ==
- Scrapheap Challenge
