= Extreme Dodgeball =

US television program

- Genre: Game show
- Created by: Rich Cronin
- Inspired by: Dodgeball: A True Underdog Story
- Developed by: Mark Cronin; James Rowley
- Directed by: Tom Maguire
- Presented by: Bil Dwyer; Zach Selwyn; Jerri Manthey (Season 1); Mary Strong (Season 2); Michele Merkin (Season 3)
- Country of origin: United States
- Original language: English
- No. of seasons: 3
- No. of episodes: 38

Production
- Executive producers: Mark Cronin; James Rowley
- Production location: Burbank, California
- Editors: Tom Danon; Tim Bartlett
- Production company: Mindless Entertainment

Original release
- Network: Game Show Network
- Release: June 15, 2004 – November 22, 2005

Extreme Dodgeball is an American game show based on the game of dodgeball that aired from June 15, 2004 to November 22, 2005 on the Game Show Network. The series ran for three seasons, each of which featured six to eight teams of five to seven players.

The first series followed gimmick teams, such as sumo wrestlers and jockeys, which changed over time into the third series with franchise-like teams representing cities. All three seasons are presented by Bil Dwyer and Zach Selwyn.

The series was created by Rich Cronin and produced by Mindless Entertainment and made to accompany the Rawson Marshall Thurber movie Dodgeball: A True Underdog Story.

== Standard rules ==
The game is a variation of dodgeball, in which players from each team attempt to hit players from the other team with a ball in order to eliminate them from the round without leaving their half of the court.

In the first two seasons, two teams of five competed in a match of three rounds in a best-of-three format. This was altered significantly for season three, see "Other Rule Changes and Amendments" below. A round ended when one of the two teams loses all five of its members. The first round was a standard match played with two dodgeballs. In the second round, often called the "Big Ball Round", a third ball twice the diameter of the other two was added into play. This ball was often used to deflect attacks. In the third round, "Dead Man Walking", the Big Ball was removed and in its place was an orange headband worn by one member of each team, in turn being designated the "Dead Man Walking". In the first and second seasons, if the Dead Man Walking was eliminated for any reason, the team he represented lost the game and consequently the match.

=== Elimination ===
In each of the three seasons, there were multiple ways for a player to be eliminated and sent to the sideline. Some variations in these regulations existed in the three seasons, but for the most part these rules remained the same. The following are ways in which a player could be eliminated:

- Getting hit with a ball, with an exception where players were allowed to stay if the ball hit them in the head
- Throwing a ball which an opponent catches (in this case, a person previously eliminated can come back in, but the number of people in the playing arena cannot exceed 5)
- Dropping a ball being used to deflect a ball thrown by an opposing player
- Crossing over the center line or (in seasons one and two) stepping outside the boundary

There were also two ways of returning to the game after being eliminated. The first, as previously mentioned, was if a player caught a ball. At this point, one of his teammates would come back onto the court, but one team could not have more than five players. The second way was called a regeneration. In the first season, if all but one member of the team were eliminated, the last player had the opportunity to hit a target aptly named the "regeneration target" and, if this was accomplished before he was eliminated, all of his teammates returned to the court. In the second season, this was changed to the last player having to stay alive for 20 seconds. In both cases, a team could only regenerate once per round. Lastly, in the third season, this rule was changed again. If the last player standing managed to stay alive for 30 seconds, only one of his teammates returned, but if the last player was eliminated, four team members returned to the game. However, this could be done an unlimited number of times.

=== Other rule changes and amendments ===
For the second season, there were two more main changes. Firstly, there was a 5-second delay of game warning. If a team held more than one ball for over 5 seconds, one of its players would be issued a "yellow card" and ejected from the court.

The second rule stated that if a player, in the opinion of the referee, was impeding the flow of play of the game by stalling, refusing to throw the ball, or attempting to force a play on the opposing team, the referee(s) could give that player a "yellow card". Two yellow cards meant that the player in question was ejected from the rest of the match. This second rule was introduced early in the second season and was called the "Benedetto Amendment" after player David Benedetto, who deliberately placed two balls immediately on his opponents' side of the court, forcing the opponents - in compliance with the above-stated five-second-rule - to approach the balls and allowing him to hit them at point blank range, a tactic which was deemed unfair by the show's producers. Although Michael 'Handsome' Constanza had used this same tactic in an Episode 3 game of Season 1, there was no five-second rule back then, so it was not as abusive.

In the third season, many significant changes were made to the rules. First, the teams would add two players each, increasing the number of players from five to seven. Still however, only five members of the team would be allowed on the court at any given time. The players who came on the court rotated; e.g. if four of a team's five players were eliminated, and the final player regenerated a teammate, the sixth member came onto the court.

The main change in this season was the format of the matches. Instead of 3 rounds which ended when all of the players on one of the teams were eliminated, the matches would be divided into four six-minute quarters, leading to a total of 24 minutes per match. The victor would not be decided by the fastest elimination of an entire team, but rather, the team with the most points at the end of the match. Eliminating an opposing player in any way granted the team one point. A bonus point was awarded for wiping out the entire opposing team.

Other small changes were added. For example, if a player received a yellow card for yelling at the referee, holding a ball for too long, disobeying the instructions given, etc., he would have to stand in a small square while a player on the other team would be given a free shot at him. If the penalized player was hit, the opposing team scored a point, but if that player left the square's boundaries, two points were awarded. Another small change was in the court itself. In previous seasons, the boundaries had been on the left, right, and front for each team. In this season, the left and right boundaries were replaced by walls, making the court more similar to that of many indoor sports, such as indoor soccer or ice hockey.

In the second quarter, the Big Ball was put in play, similarly to the first two seasons. Since the big ball was used mainly for defending and was difficult to throw, two bonus points were awarded for a kill with the big ball throw.

In the third and fourth quarters, the teams were on the side opposite of that on which they started. In the fourth quarter, the orange Dead Man Walking headbands came into play. One player on each team would be required to wear the headband at all times. Every time a Dead Man Walking was eliminated, the other team gained two bonus points, but the headband was simply transferred to a teammate. When two minutes remained in this quarter, there would be a break in the game where the teams were allowed to switch players on the court with ones on the bench (but each team retains the same number of players that were on the court before). At the end of the fourth quarter, the team with the most points would be declared the victor and win $5,000.

If after the fourth quarter, a tie was reached, the game went into overtime, in which each team chose three players to represent them on the court. There were no regenerations, and catching a ball would not bring in a new player—once a player was out, he stayed out for good. The team which could outlast the opposition was declared the winner of the match.

In the third season, referees were able to give players red cards, much like in soccer. If a player was given a red card, he would be out for the rest of the game. Players were given red cards if they behaved in a particularly improper manner too serious for a yellow card, such as physical contact with an opponent in a harsh manner. Red cards were uncommon, but had been given multiple times. One player, Brian DeCato, was even suspended for the season for repeated offenses.

=== Tournament format and prize structure ===
In season 1, each team played 5 matches; afterwards all 8 competed in the playoffs with 1st facing 8th, 2nd facing 7th, etc. The winners of these playoffs won $10,000.

In season 2, each team played 10 matches, and the top 3 teams from each division advanced to the playoffs. In the first round, the #2 and #3 seed in each division faced off against each other. The winner of these matches faced the #1 seed of their respective division (who earned a bye in round 1) in a playoff match for $5,000. Then the 2 division winners would face off in the championship match for an additional $20,000 ($25,000 total).

In season 3, each team played 10 matches as in the previous season, with the winners of each match receiving the prize money of $5,000. The four teams with the best records advanced to the playoffs, where the winners of the semifinals received another $5,000. The grand champions added an additional $10,000 to their prize money total. A team could win up to $65,000 for winning every match of the season.

== Hosts ==
For all three seasons, the hosts have been Bil Dwyer and Zach Selwyn.

== Sideline reporters ==
- Season 1: Jerri Manthey of Survivor
- Season 2: Mary Strong
- Season 3: Michele Merkin of E! Entertainment Network

== Commissioner ==
Rip Torn, who played Patches O'Houlihan in Dodgeball: A True Underdog Story, joined in Season 3 as the commissioner of the league.

== Teams ==
Each team in Extreme Dodgeball had a gimmick. This could reflect the fact that gimmick teams were featured heavily in Dodgeball: A True Underdog Story. Usually, the members of a team shared a common profession, as indicated by their team name.

In the first season, the teams wore clothing matching their gimmick, e.g. the CPA wore vests and neckties, while the Stallion Battalion wore racing silks. In the subsequent seasons, all teams instead wore uniforms similar to basketball jerseys, in team colors.

=== Season 1 ===
- CPA: Certified Public Assassins - Certified Public Accountants - Season 1 Champions, and winners of the $10,000 grand prize; they also went undefeated throughout the season.
  - Tobias "The Sniper" McKinney - creator of the famous "Suicide Leap", where the thrower jumps over the center line, and hits the victim with the ball before he lands, therefore the kill is valid.
  - Michael "Handsome" Constanza - named the MVP of the season, he had amazing throwing skills and clocked in with the most accuracy, and also held the season record for the fastest throwing speed at 82 MPH.
  - Mandy "Sunshine" Sommers - known for catching almost any ball thrown at her.
  - Steve Altes
  - Gretchen Weiss
- Barbell Mafia - Bodybuilders - Season 1 Runners-up, lost to CPA in the final match.
  - Tyrone "The Rush Factor" Rush
  - Alan "Diesel" Grimes
  - Jeramy "The Mountain" Freeman
  - Amazon Beard
  - Melissa "Coates Rack" Coates
- Armed Response - Security guards
  - David "The Animal" Benedetto
  - Clay "Chainsaw" Krueger
  - Andrew "Barishnikov" Brawley
  - Michelle "Manu" Manumaleuna
  - Laura "Major" Farley
- Ink, Incorporated - Tattoo artists - Known to hate the Mimes.
  - Ben "Psycho/Evil Robot" Toth
  - Shawn "The Hitman" Hauser
  - Jessica Cabo "Wabo"
  - Damion "The Omen" Troy
  - Rebecca Pontius - sister of Mark Pontius of the Mimes and, later, the Reef Sharks
- Curves of Steel - Female bodybuilders, plus a male trainer
  - Kel Watrin
  - Lillith "Fair" Fields
  - Kimberly "Slim Kim" Estrada
  - Maritza Franco
  - Amelie McKendry
- Silent But Deadly Mimes - Mime artists
  - Mark "Pretty Boy" Pontius
  - Lamonte Goode
  - Laura Hight
  - Stephen Sande
  - "Angelina" Jolie Bailey
- Stallion Battalion - Jockeys
  - Kenny "Dirty" Sanchez
  - Mark "M&M" Munoz
  - Michael Pipkin
  - Christina "Shorty" Knizner
  - Lissette Garcia
- Sumo Storm - Sumo wrestlers - Lost all six of their matches, including a loss to the CPA in the first playoff round.
  - Billy Acquaviva
  - "Captain" Americus Abesamis
  - Dante Alighieri
  - Jon Beardsley
  - Crystal "Chainsaw" Cartwright
    - Katasha Nelson - filled in three regular season matches for Cartwright while she was injured.

=== Season 2 ===
In this season, the teams were divided into the Classic Division and the Expansion Division. The former consisted of the Top 4 teams of the previous season, while the latter consisted of entirely new teams.

Classic Division

- Armed Response - Season 2 Champions, winning the $25,000 grand prize.
  - David "The Animal" Benedetto, returning
  - David "Don't Call Me Condoleezza" Rice
  - Kel Watrin, returning from Curves of Steel
    - Danno Kingman - filled in the last three regular season matches for Watrin while he was injured.
  - Tanya Fenderbosch
  - Nicole Zingale
- CPA: Certified Public Assassins - Previously undefeated as the Season 1 champions; received a bye for being first in the Classic Division despite losing three of their regular season matches, but were eliminated after the playoff semifinals.
  - Tobias "The Sniper" McKinney, returning
  - Michael "Handsome" Constanza, returning
  - Mandy "Sunshine" Sommers, returning
  - Art "Fly like a" Spiegel
  - Natasha Pospich
- Ink, Incorporated - Eliminated after the playoff quarterfinals.
  - Ben "Psycho/Evil Robot" Toth, returning
  - Kimberly "Slim Kim" Estrada, returning from Curves of Steel
  - Strati Hovartez
  - "Scary" Kari Richardson
  - Shawn Hauser, returning
- Barbell Mafia - Suffered a long losing streak and were eliminated after the regular season; this was surprising, considering most of their players were the same.
  - Tyrone "The Rush Factor" Rush, returning
  - Melissa "Coates Rack" Coates, returning
  - Jeramy "The Mountain" Freeman, returning
  - Vanessa Altman
  - Alan "Diesel" Grimes, returning

Expansion Division

- Delta Force - Military troopers - Season 2 Runners-up, lost to Armed Response in the championship match after having received a bye for being first in the Expansion Division; they won $5,000 for reaching the finals.
  - Paul "Rambo" Green
  - Lisa "The Beach Tiger" Marshall
  - Geoff Mead
  - Linda "I'm Crying" Overhue
  - Bobby "Salmon" Roe
- Reef Sharks - Surfers - Eliminated after the playoff semifinals.
  - Chris Bullis
  - Mark "Big Nasty" Long (of Road Rules and Real World/Road Rules Challenge fame)
  - Mark "Pretty Boy" Pontius, returning from Silent But Deadly Mimes
  - Melanie Thomas
  - Amy Wiseman
- Bling - Urban/Hip-Hop artists - Led the Expansion Division for the majority of the season, but finished second in the division and were eliminated after the playoff quarterfinals.
  - Alvina "Virginia Slim" Carroll
  - Frank "The Tank/The Big Pasta" Frisoli
  - Portis "The Crazy Chinchilla" Hershey
  - Mia "Pimpin'" Parler
  - Adam "Malibu's Most Wanted" Ullberg
- MAD: Mutually Assured Destruction - Scientists - Eliminated after the regular season.
  - Anna Bartsch
  - Tarone Cathcart
  - Gary "Spaz" Davis
  - Marie Philman
  - Marc Van Norden

=== Season 3 ===
The teams in Season 3 had city themes rather than personal themes. The teams each had seven players, including a celebrity team captain.

- New York Bling - Season 3 Champions.
  - Mia St. John - her first kill of the season was made in the championship game.
  - Tyrone "The Rush Factor" Rush, returning from Season 2's Barbell Mafia - led the league in kills this season with 88.
  - Wade Clark
  - Tami "Goggles" Bahat
  - Greg "The Dirty Hippy" Lang
  - Brian DeCato - was ejected at halftime during a game Vs. Detroit Spoilers as he assaulted Strati Hovartez. Eventually, he was suspended for the rest of the season.
    - Justin Leffler - replaced DeCato after he was suspended in Week 15; got injured during a victory celebration after a game Vs. Chicago Hitmen. Eventually, he was out for the rest of the season.
      - Matt "Ryan Seacrest" Gibbons - temporarily replaced DeCato in Week 12 and replaced Leffler after the latter was injured in Week 15.
  - Portis "The Crazy Chinchilla" Hershey, returning - led the league in Big Ball kills with 6.
- Philadelphia Benjamins - Season 3 Runners-Up.
  - Jeremiah "The Axeman" Trotter - led celebrity captains in kills and led the league in Big Ball kills with 6. Was also selected as the favorite male captain by the commissioner of Extreme Dodgeball.
    - Michael Lee - filled in for Trotter while he was injured.
    - Paul Gene - filled in for Trotter while he was injured, although Gene got injured himself during a game Vs. Denver Hurlers.
  - Chris "Sweatting" Bullis, returning from Reef Sharks
  - Art "Fly Like A" Spigel, returning from CPA - led the league in last man standing survivals.
  - Mia Parler, returning from Bling.
  - Justin "Blueberry" Hill - led the league in Dead Man Walking kills with 13 and led the team in kills.
  - Lisa "The Beach Tiger" Marshall, returning from Delta Force
  - Morgan "Needle In The" Hay - was the team leader and 2nd in the league in catches with 30, including a highlighted double catch wipeout Vs. Denver Hurlers, and ranked fourth in kills with 70.
- Chicago Hitmen - Lost to the Philadelphia Benjamins in the playoff semi-finals.
  - Hal Sparks
  - Rob "Astro" Clyde
  - Erik "The Breadtruck" Tillmans
  - Anna Bartsch, returning from MAD - was given an honorable mention as she had more catches than all the other female athletes and half of the men in the league.
  - K.J. Phelps - led the league and rookies in catches with 34.
  - Marie Philman, returning from MAD
  - Kenneth Hughes
- Denver Hurlers - Lost to the New York Bling in the playoff semi-finals.
  - Tara Dakides
  - Bobby "Salmon" Roe, returning from Delta Force
  - Danno Kingman, returning from Season 2's Armed Response (he was their substitute)
  - Adrian "The Ghoul" Quihius
  - Gary "Spaz" Davis, returning from MAD
  - Kelly "Orale" Lavato - was injured in Week 9 after her teammate, Bobby Roe, accidentally smashed her against the wall. She was out for the rest of the season.
    - Linda "I'm Crying" Overhue, returning from Delta Force - replaced Lavato after she was injured.
  - Micah "Lead Me to the Promised Land" Moses
- Los Angeles Armed Response - Eliminated after the regular season.
  - Mario Lopez
  - David "The Animal" Benedetto, returning
  - Kel Watrin, returning
  - Tanya Fenderbosch, returning
  - Damien "Mouth" Ward
  - Mandy "Sunshine" Sommers, returning from CPA
  - Sebastian "Beam Me Up" Sciotti - led the rookies in kills with 87.
- Detroit Spoilers - Lost all ten of their regular season matches.
  - Kerri Walsh - was selected as the favorite female celebrity captain by the commissioner of Extreme Dodgeball as she had more kills and more points than any other female competitor in the league with 23.
  - David "Don't Call Me Condoleezza" Rice, returning from Armed Response
  - Jason "The Boner" Caliz
  - Strati Hovartez, returning from Ink, Inc. - known for his ballistic temper between games despite his great skills.
  - Adam "Malibu's Most Wanted" Ullberg, returning from Bling
  - Kimberly "Slim Kim" Estrada, returning from Season 2's Ink, Inc. and Season 1's Curves of Steel
  - Ben "Psycho" Toth, returning from Ink, Inc. - known for calling his Big Ball offense “The Fist of the Unicorn.”
