= Dream Job =

- Starring: Stuart Scott; Tony Kornheiser
- Country of origin: United States
- No. of episodes: 22

Production
- Running time: 60 minutes

Original release
- Network: ESPN
- Release: February 1, 2004 – January 1, 2006

Dream Job is an American reality television series made by ESPN, which premiered on February 22, 2004. It was the network's second reality show, with two editions of Beg, Borrow & Deal having previously aired. However, this was the first reality show from a network to offer its winner an on-air place on one of its shows. The show was hosted by Stuart Scott.

== Summary ==
The premise of Dream Job was to find a new anchor for ESPN's popular sports news program, SportsCenter. The winner of Dream Job would get a one-year contract with the network, and play a trivia quiz on SportsCenter to determine her or his annual salary. The winner would also receive a new Mazda 3. Every week, either one or two contestants would be cut from the show as the American viewing public and the show's judging panel were allowed the power of whom they wanted to be cut from the show.

== Season 1 ==
=== Contestants ===
In September 2003, the show's producers went on a nationwide talent search to find those who wanted a chance to be an ESPN anchor. Over 10,000 people attended the talent search across the United States. The field was narrowed down to 10 contestants who would compete in the televised finals, which started in the Winter of 2004. Originally, the show wanted 11 contestants, 10 from the nationwide search, and another from a contest that was being sponsored by the popular fast food chain Wendy's. A 12th contestant would be selected as an alternate.

The last 12 contestants still in the running on the premiere episode ranged in age from 21 to 40. They were:

- Maggie Haskins, the youngest contestant, a Chicago native who was a full-time student at Brown University in Providence, Rhode Island. Haskins was originally the alternate, but producers later changed their minds and she competed from the show's first episode.
- Michael Quigley, the oldest contestant, an auto parts salesman from Lansdowne, Pennsylvania. Quigley quickly became known for his over-the-top anchoring style, similar to a play-by-play announcer.
- Aaron Levine, 21, a senior at Stanford University
- Mike Hall, 22, a senior at the University of Missouri
- Casey Stern, 25, an executive recruiter from Bellmore, New York
- Zachariah Selwyn, 28, an actor and a musician from Los Angeles
- Nick Stevens, 29, a Brooklyn-based comedian
- Chris Williams, 31, an attorney from Boston
- Chet Anekwe, 38, a Nigerian-born computer programmer from Jersey City
- Alvin Williams, 38, a retail manager from Montgomery, Alabama (Williams won the contest sponsored by Wendy's to become a contestant on the show)
- Kelly Milligan, 38, a Dallas attorney
- Lori Rubinson, 39, from New York City, now a host at WFAN

=== Judges ===
The judging panel consisted of:

- Tony Kornheiser, The Washington Post columnist and author, and co-host of ESPN's talk show, Pardon the Interruption.
- Kit Hoover, a former Fox News correspondent, cast member on the inaugural season of MTV's Road Rules, and co-host of the ESPN2 morning show, Cold Pizza.
- LaVar Arrington, a former NFL linebacker, who at the time played for the Washington Redskins.
- Al Jaffe, the Vice President of Talent at ESPN.

The judging panel's job consisted of giving criticism to the contestants after performing a task on the show and cutting contestants.

=== Episodes ===
There was one segment that recurred each week on the show called "My SportsCenter." Each contestant was to read a highlight, or, as they did in week 4, introduce packages done by the person they were co-anchoring their segment with. Each show also consisted of a different sporting event. These ranged from an analysis of the NCAA men's basketball tournament to the "Al Jaffe Sports Quiz", which is given to every on-air personality who applies for a job at ESPN.

The first two weeks of the show saw the contestants split into groups of 6, and each doing the "My SportsCenter" segment solo. To break a tie between Chris Williams and Michael Quigley at the end of the first show, Scott called a network executive who made the final decision to cut Chris Williams. Alvin Williams was cut the following week. In week 3, on March 7, 2004, the "My SportsCenter" segment became co-anchored, and Quigley and Rubenson were voted off. For the "My SportsCenter" segment in week 4, on March 14, 2004, all the eight remaining contestants were sent to Florida to do reports on Major League Baseball teams in Spring Training. Stevens and Chet Anekwe were cut. A special episode chronicling the nationwide search was shown the night after. In week 5, on March 21, 2004, "My SportsCenter" again became a solo segment, with each contestant reading two highlight packages, both on the NCAA men's basketball tournament. The Al Jaffe Sports Quiz took place that night as well. Each of the six remaining contestants were asked five questions. Selwyn scored highest, answering three questions correctly. After the segment, though, host Scott called out Haskins and Hall. Two days earlier, on March 19, 2004, the entertainment section of the New York Post ran a brief paragraph that stated that Hall and Haskins had been dating for some time. When asked, they confirmed the article's truth, but not directly. Amidst all the romance talk, Stern and Milligan were cut that night.

==== Finale ====
The two-hour finale, airing on March 28, 2004, would determine who the new SportsCenter anchor would be. In the first hour, only the judges would determine who got cut. Haskins and Selwyn, arguably the most popular contestants on the show, were cut, leaving Levine and Hall in the championship round. Haskins was tabbed by Jaffe as the show's most improved contestant. She was praised for having the best writing during her time on the show. When making the decision to cut Selwyn, Kornheiser said, "I probably just made a mistake." In hour two, the American viewing public would cut one more contestant. At the end of the night, Levine was cut by garnering 60% of the viewers' votes. Mike Hall was the first ever Dream Job winner.

Later that night on SportsCenter, Hall took his sports quiz and correctly answered five questions. Each correct answer was worth $5,000, increasing his first-year salary from $70,000 to $95,000. He graduated from the University of Missouri on May 15, 2004. He started his tenure as a regular SportsCenter anchor on July 19, 2004. He had done some on-air work for ESPNEWS before officially joining SportsCenter.

As for Selwyn, he became a color commentator on the Game Show Network series, Extreme Dodgeball, which began on June 15, 2004. He also hosted three episodes of Around the Horn, which some believe may have been a trial of sorts to determine if he was worthy to replace Tony Reali. He currently can be seen on Attack of the Show on G4.

== Season 2 ==
David Holmes won season 2 of Dream Job.

== Season 3 ==
=== Judges ===
All five judges from Season 2 returned: The Denver Post columnist, Cold Pizza contributor, and Around the Horn panelist Woody Page; former Cold Pizza co-host Kit Hoover (who actually made her final appearance on Cold Pizza during this Dream Job season); The Philadelphia Inquirer writer and ESPN NBA analyst who was judging possible colleagues, Stephen A. Smith; and ESPN executive vice-president of talent, Al Jaffe. Voting stayed the same. Each judge and the American viewing public was given one vote each to cut a contestant with. In the event of a tie between contestants, America's vote would be the tie-breaker.

=== Contestants ===
The show's contestants were six former NBA stars vying to become ESPN's next NBA analyst:

- Dennis Scott, who spent most of his career with the Orlando Magic
- Dee Brown, who is most famous for winning the 1991 slam dunk contest with a no-look dunk while playing for the Boston Celtics (he also played for the Toronto Raptors and the Magic before retiring)
- Matt Bullard, who won an NBA championship with the Houston Rockets in 1994
- Darryl Dawkins, who, in 1975, became the first high school player ever to be drafted directly into the league
- J.R. Reid, who averaged double figures in scoring during his first three years in the NBA
- Gerald Wilkins, one of the most popular New York Knicks ever

Dana Barros was originally slated to be one of the six contestants, but was missing from the show during its first episode, apparently dropping out at the last minute. He was replaced by the Orlando Magic's first-ever draft pick, Nick Anderson, but Anderson soon exited, and was replaced by Dennis Scott.

=== Summary ===
Due to Barros' absence, there were only five contestants for the season premiere. This meant that at the end of the episode, no one would be cut; ESPN thus touted the first episode as a "special preview" episode. Promotional ads for the show leading up to episode two said Nick Anderson would be Barros' replacement, but those ads quickly disappeared, as Anderson was then replaced by Dennis Scott. On episode two, Wilkins was the first contestant to go. The following week, Dawkins was gone, the victim of America's vote being used as a tiebreaker when he got his second cut vote of the night, though Scott also had two cut votes. Week four saw Reid saying goodbye, with Scott finally getting the boot in week five. That left Bullard and Brown in the last showdown for the Dream Job of ESPN NBA analyst. Bullard's mistakes got the best of him, and Dee Brown was the winner of the third season of the show, as Bullard got three votes to be cut.
