= Lake Local School District (Stark County) =

School district in Ohio

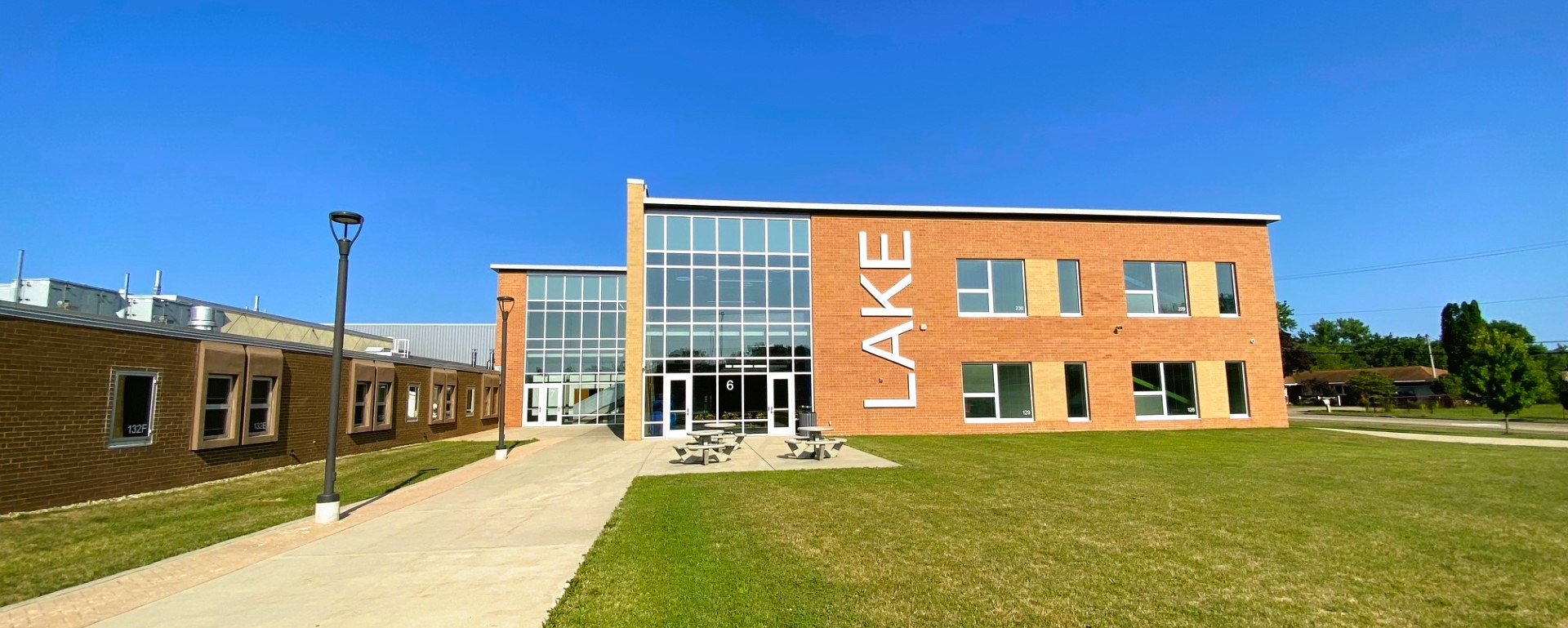

Address
- 436 King Church Ave SW Uniontown, Ohio, 44685; United States
- Coordinates: 40°57′14″N 81°22′8″W

District information
- Type: Public school district
- Grades: Pre-K to 12
- Superintendent: Brett Yeagley
- NCES District ID: 3904986

Students and staff
- Enrollment: 3,404 (2020–21)
- Faculty: 187.96 (on an FTE basis)
- Student–teacher ratio: 18.11
- District mascot: Blue Streaks
- Colors: Red, white, and royal blue

Other information
- Website: lakelocal.org

The Lake Local School School District is a public school district based in Hartville, Ohio, United States. The district serves most of Lake Township, the village of Hartville, and small portions of Marlboro Township, all in Stark County, along with a small part of Suffield Township in Portage County. The district was established in 1957 through a consolidation of the Uniontown and Hartville local schools. Students in the district attend Lake Primary School in Uniontown for grades Pre-K through 1, Lake Elementary School in Hartville for grades 2 through 6, and Lake Middle/High School in Hartville for grades 7 through 12. The superintendent is Brett Yeagley.
