= Mike Senese =

- Born: January 24, 1975 (age 50); Denver, Colorado, U.S.
- Education: UCLA (BA) (MBA/MFA)
- Occupation(s): TV personality, tech journalist
- Television: Punkin Chunkin; Catch It Keep It; HowStuffWorks; Rock and Roll Acid Test
- Website: mikesenese.com

Mike Senese (born January 24, 1975) is an American television host and technology journalist. He served as the Executive Editor for Make: magazine from 2013 to 2022. He co-hosted Science Channel's engineering show Catch It Keep It with Zach Selwyn, as the "engineer of destruction," designing and building complicated machines that would potentially destroy each episode's prize while explaining the scientific principles behind each episode's themes.

He also hosted Science Channel's 2009 coverage of Punkin Chunkin, also with Selwyn. This episode was the most viewed show ever for Science Channel.

Senese co-hosted Fuse television's Rock and Roll Acid Test, which applied the MythBusters ethic to music lore, and has appeared in various episodes of Discovery Channel's HowStuffWorks as well as Spike's 1000 Ways To Die. He plays a small role in the 2009 independent feature Sorry, Thanks, starring Wiley Wiggins and Moshe Kasher.

He has worked for Wired magazine and ReadyMade magazine. Senese also runs the DIY project blog DOIT.

== Personal life ==
Senese was born in Denver, Colorado and moved frequently through his early years, stopping in Cleveland, Ohio, New Jersey, and Connecticut. At age nine, his family settled in northern California, where he attended junior high and high school with future Saturday Night Live cast member Jeff Richards and musician Cass McCombs. He credits his parents' frequent moves and DIY ethos for his continued passion for making, wayfaring, and cultivating new experiences.

After high school Senese attended UC Santa Barbara and UCLA, initially studying engineering but later changing majors to Spanish while traveling extensively. He subsequently received master's degrees in international business from Arizona State and Universidad Carlos III in Madrid, Spain.

Senese and his wife Sandra married in 2011 in Santa Barbara, California. They have one child, and live in the San Francisco Bay Area. He currently works for artificial intelligence tech startup Edge Impulse.
