= Matt Bullard =

American basketball player (born 1967)

Personal information
- Born: June 5, 1967 (age 59) Des Moines, Iowa, U.S.
- Listed height: 6 ft 10 in (2.08 m)
- Listed weight: 215 lb (98 kg)

Career information
- High school: Valley (West Des Moines, Iowa)
- College: Colorado (1985–1987); Iowa (1988–1990)
- NBA draft: 1990: undrafted
- Playing career: 1990–2002
- Position: Power forward / small forward
- Number: 50

Career history
- 1990–1994: Houston Rockets
- 1994–1995: PAOK
- 1995–1996: Atlanta Hawks
- 1996–2001: Houston Rockets
- 2001–2002: Charlotte Hornets

Career highlights
- NBA champion (1994); Greek Cup (1995)

Career NBA statistics
- Points: 3,270 (5.3 ppg)
- 3-Pointers: 599
- 3P%: .384
- Stats at NBA.com
- Stats at Basketball Reference
Medals
Men's basketball
Representing the United States
FIBA Americas Championship
Silver medal – second place	1989 Mexico City	National team
Summer Universiade
Silver medal – second place	1987 Zagreb	National team
Gold medal – first place	1989 Duisburg	National team

Matthew Gordon Bullard (born June 5, 1967) is an American former professional basketball player in the NBA and former color analyst for the Houston Rockets on AT&T SportsNet Southwest. Bullard played 12 years professionally and 11 years in the NBA, most notably with the Houston Rockets from 1990 to 1994, and then again from 1996 to 2001. Other teams he played for include the Atlanta Hawks, Charlotte Hornets, and PAOK in Greece.

== Early life ==
Matt Bullard went to Valley High School in West Des Moines, Iowa. He went undrafted after graduating from the University of Iowa in 1990.

== Professional career ==
Bullard played nine seasons with the Houston Rockets (1990–94, 1996–2001) and one season each with both the Atlanta Hawks (1995–96) and the Charlotte Hornets (2001–02). He also played in the 1994–95 season for the Greek League power PAOK. He has career averages of 5.3 points and two rebounds per game. He was known affectionately in Houston as "Air Bullard" in part for his ability to get extreme height on his three-point shots (due to his height at 2.08 m, 6 ft 10 in) and partly as good-natured ribbing about his poor vertical jump, but Bullard was also a fan favorite and an essential part to Houston's first championship in 1994.

== Post–basketball life ==
In 2004, Bullard lost to Dee Brown on the ESPN reality television program Dream Job in the finals as they competed for a coveted sports analyst position on the sports network. When asked about losing to Dee Brown, Bullard remarked "at least it wasn't Pete Chilcutt". He and Clyde Drexler shared color commentating duties for local Houston Rockets game telecasts alongside long-time play-by-play man Bill Worrell. On June 2, 2021, Bullard announced that his tenure with AT&T SportsNet Southwest was done and he would not be part of its broadcast lineup for the 2021-22 NBA season.

== Career statistics ==
=== NBA ===
Legend
GP	Games played	GS	Games started	MPG	Minutes per game
FG%	Field goal percentage	3P%	3-point field goal percentage	FT%	Free throw percentage
RPG	Rebounds per game	APG	Assists per game	SPG	Steals per game
BPG	Blocks per game	PPG	Points per game	**Bold**	Career high
†	Won an NBA championship

==== Regular season ====
Year	Team	GP	GS	MPG	FG%	3P%	FT%	RPG	APG	SPG	BPG	PPG
1990–91	Houston	18	0	3.5	.452	.000	.647	.8	.1	.2	.0	2.2
1991–92	Houston	**80**	7	16.0	**.459**	.386	.760	**2.8**	.9	.3	.3	6.4
1992–93	Houston	79	4	17.2	.431	.374	.784	**2.8**	**1.4**	.4	.1	**7.3**
1993–94†	Houston	65	0	11.2	.345	.325	.769	1.3	1.0	.2	.1	3.5
1995–96	Atlanta	46	0	10.0	.407	.361	.800	1.3	.4	.4	.2	3.8
1996–97	Houston	71	12	14.4	.401	.366	.735	1.6	.9	.3	.3	4.5
1997–98	Houston	67	24	17.8	.450	.416	.741	2.2	.9	**.5**	**.4**	7.0
1998–99	Houston	41	0	10.1	.377	.387	.700	1.0	.4	.3	.1	2.9
1999–00	Houston	56	**27**	**18.3**	.409	**.446**	.833	2.5	1.1	.3	.2	6.8
2000–01	Houston	61	5	16.4	.423	.404	.714	2.1	.7	.2	.1	5.8
2001–02	Charlotte	31	0	11.3	.339	.281	**.917**	1.5	.5	.1	.1	3.4
Career		615	79	14.4	.418	.384	.768	2.0	.9	.3	.2	5.3

==== Playoffs ====
Year	Team	GP	GS	MPG	FG%	3P%	FT%	RPG	APG	SPG	BPG	PPG
1993	Houston	**12**	0	**14.1**	.476	.536	**1.000**	**1.9**	**1.1**	**.3**	.4	**5.1**
1994†	Houston	10	0	5.5	.214	.200	.750	1.0	.0	.1	.2	1.6
1996	Atlanta	4	0	12.8	.333	.500	.500	1.5	.0	.0	**.5**	3.5
1997	Houston	2	0	3.5	**1.000**	**1.000**	–	1.0	.0	.0	.0	3.0
1998	Houston	5	**4**	14.0	.333	.300	**1.000**	1.6	1.0	.2	.0	3.4
1999	Houston	2	0	4.0	**1.000**	**1.000**	**1.000**	.0	.5	.0	.0	3.5
Career		35	4	10.3	.400	.458	.818	1.4	.5	.2	.3	3.5
