= Route 66 (1993 TV series) =

American television series

- Based on: Route 66 by Herbert B. Leonard & Stirling Silliphant
- Developed by: Harley Peyton
- Starring: James Wilder; Dan Cortese
- Composer: Warren Zevon
- Country of origin: United States
- Original language: English
- No. of seasons: 1
- No. of episodes: 4

Production
- Running time: 60 minutes
- Production companies: Herbert B. Leonard Enterprises; Fabulous Lost Cities; Propaganda Films; Columbia Pictures Television

Original release
- Network: NBC
- Release: June 8 – July 6, 1993

Route 66 is an adventure drama sequel series and a remake of the 60's TV series of the same name that aired on NBC from June 8 until July 6, 1993.

== Plot ==
Nick Lewis is notified of his estranged father's death while at work (he is a steel worker in Allentown, PA) He is informed by his father's lawyer/executor that he was left the contents of a small house. It is then that we discover his father was Buzz Murdock, who accompanied Tod Stiles on many adventures during the first three seasons of the original 1960s series. He was also left a vintage red C1 Corvette, which presumably his father picked up sometime after departing from Tod.

On his way back to Allentown, he picks up a wayward hitchhiker, Arthur Clark, and they begin to travel together. They find adventure by staying off the Interstates, mostly in small towns and by interacting with the people they meet there.

== Cast ==
- James Wilder as Nick Lewis
- Dan Cortese as Arthur Clark

== Episodes ==
Details verified by off the air video tapes of the original transmission.

No.	Title	Directed by	Written by	Original release date
1	"Pilot"	Ken Kwapis	Harley Peyton	June 8, 1993
2	"Everybody's a Hero"	Mark Sobel	Paul Barber & Larry Barber	June 15, 1993
3	"Dream Lover"	Michael Schultz	Joe Minion	June 29, 1993
4	"The Stolen Bride"	Bill Norton	Barry Pullman & Harley Peyton	July 6, 1993
