= Dave Holmes (sportscaster) =

American sportscaster

David Holmes is an American sportscaster and was also the winner of the second season of Dream Job, the ESPN reality television talent search show that looks for new on-air talent for the all-sports television network. A 22-year-old student at Kent State University who comes from Uniontown, Ohio, Holmes got onto the show by being one of the two Wendy's Wild Card Winners (the other being K.C. James). It took Holmes a while to find his rhythm, but once he picked it up, he was nearly flawless, though he did stumble on occasions throughout the season. He came close to being cut in both episodes three and nine, but survived to take a not-so-easy win in the season's tenth and final episode over Grant Thompson, who was almost as, if not more, solid than Holmes most of the time, but Thompson's major stumbles in episode ten aided Holmes in his win.

Along with his one-year ESPN contract, Holmes made $70,000 in his first year, and was awarded with a brand-new Mazda6 5-door car. He started at ESPNews at the first of the year, but on observation to see how sportscasting outside the reality stage worked. His first on-air appearance did not take place until late February 2005. It was also on ESPNews, where he began to go by "Dave."

== Dream Job ==
At the time of Dream Job, Holmes stated he "needs to pass one more online course to get his broadcast journalism degree" from Kent State University. When Holmes won, Kent State declared Feb. 19 as Dave Holmes Day at Kent State and then introduced him at the ESPN Bracket Buster game in the Memorial Athletic and Convocation Center.

Holmes did try out for the show's first season, got to the semifinals of the competition, but was passed over for the televised finals for the Spring of 2004.

== Life after ESPN ==
After ESPN, Dave went on to work at WTVG, the ABC affiliate in Toledo, OH, which he joined on April 2, 2007. He worked there as a sports reporter and anchor. He also served as the sports director at 13abc.

In the fall of 2015, Dave announced that he would be leaving 13abc in Toledo for WBNS in Columbus, OH. At the Columbus CBS affiliate, Dave serves as a sports reporter and weekend sports anchor. He also covers the Ohio State Buckeyes football team both at home and on the road.
