= Stump the Schwab =

American sports trivia game show

- Created by: Howie Schwab
- Presented by: Stuart Scott
- Starring: Howie Schwab
- Country of origin: United States
- No. of seasons: 4
- No. of episodes: 80

Production
- Running time: 30 minutes
- Production companies: Diplomatic Productions (2004); Embassy Row Productions (2005); Inward Eye Entertainment (2005–2006)

Original release
- Network: ESPN2 (2004–2005); ESPN Classic (2006)
- Release: July 8, 2004 – September 29, 2006

Stump the Schwab is an American game show that aired on ESPN2 and ESPN Classic from July 8, 2004 to September 29, 2006. The show featured three contestants trying to defeat Howie Schwab, ESPN's first statistician, in a sports trivia contest. Stuart Scott was the show's host. The show also appeared on Canada's The Score Television Network.

Each episode of the show had three rounds, "Leading Off", a second round that featured a different game each time, and "The Schwab Showdown." After each of the first two rounds, the contestant with the lowest score was eliminated.

== Gameplay ==
Three contestants competed against "The Schwab" in a series of three rounds, with the lowest-scoring player being eliminated after each round.

=== Round 1: Leading Off ===
Each episode began with "Leading Off", a round where the 3 contestants and "The Schwab" took turns naming an athlete or team on a list relating to a major achievement; for example, "Name the top 16 players that led the National League in home runs in the year 1975." This round consisted of three such lists, and each contestant was given a turn to begin a list. During the first two seasons, the full list was displayed on screen for the home viewers, with each person who had not been named displayed in white letters, and each person correctly named having their names displayed in blue letters. Starting in the third season, answers were shown only as they were given by players, allowing home viewers to "play along." At the end of the question, all answers were shown. Each correct answer was worth one point. If a contestant or "The Schwab" gave a wrong answer, could not come up with an answer in time, or gave an answer that was already said (regardless if the answer was on the list or not), he was eliminated for the rest of the topic with the spotlight shining over him darkened. If there was only one player (including "The Schwab") left, that player scored only one additional point by giving another correct answer. Whoever had the lowest score at the end of "Leading Off" was eliminated from the show, while the remaining two contestants went on to face each other in Round Two.

=== Round 2 ===
A variety of different games were used for round two in each episode. "The Schwab" did not compete against the contestants in that round, but did ask some questions to the contestants, and when no one was able to get a right answer, he would reveal the correct answer. Some of the games were as follows:

- Lineup Card: A team that won a championship in a certain year had its starting lineup displayed on a screen (e.g., the 1988 Kansas Jayhawks, who won the men's NCAA basketball national championship over the Oklahoma Sooners that year). Not all members of the starting lineup were on-screen, so each contestant had to fill in the other players not listed. Usually, three lists were given to each contestant; the first list had three spaces to be filled in within 15 seconds; the second, four spaces in 20 seconds; and the third, 5 spaces in 25 seconds. Contestants took turns trying to fill in players, and a contestant "stole" any missing answers that the other was not able to give in round 3. One point was given for each correct player named or stolen.
- Who Am I?: "The Schwab" held a card with the name of an athlete or a coach on it, he would give the contestants various hints about that player or coach, given a specific category (e.g., "Coaching Legends") before the first hint came for that player or coach. Hints ranged from 7 points to one point, with a 7-point hint being the hardest, and a one-point hint the easiest. "The Schwab" gave the first contestant the 7-point hint, and then questions decreased in point value one-by-one. If a player did not wish to answer the question, he passed. If a contestant got a wrong answer, they were eliminated for the remainder of the topic.
- Name That: Similar to "Who Am I?", but contestants bid for the right to answer a question in the fewest clues (similar to the Bid-a-Note round on Name That Tune), with a lower number of clues being worth more points along the same scheme as "Who Am I?". In the first season only, all answers were worth 5 points regardless of the number of clues given. In the most recent seasons, that style of trivia game had been used more often than "Who Am I?"
- Lights, Camera, Schwab: This game involved questions about sports movies. There were four categories of questions, with each category containing a 1, 2, and 3 point question. Only 1-point questions were available at first, and higher value questions for each category could not be heard until the lower value questions had been asked. Contestants had to buzz in to answer the question. Whichever contestant had correctly answered a question last chose the category for the next question.
- Schwab's Family Album: Contestants had to buzz in and identify the famous sports figure in a photograph even though the person's face was obscured with that of "The Schwab". Each correct answer was worth 1 point. Photographs were usually of famous sports moments and occasions. Most of the photos elicited a laugh from the crowd.
- Alma Matters: Contestants identified where current and former players on a specific team went to college. Generally speaking, each player was presented two lists of eight players and 30 seconds to fill each one in, and missing answers were "stolen" by the other contestant. Each correct answer was worth 1 point. The lists followed themes, such as all famous players from a certain team, or all famous players of a certain position.
- Odd Man Out: A contestant was presented with 4 similar athletes on the board (for example, college basketball players Julian Wright, Brandon Rush, Mario Chalmers, and Sherron Collins). Three of them had something in common, and a question was asked where the contestant had to determine who did not fit into the criteria of the question (i.e., who is the odd man out, such as "Three of these players have scored over twenty points in a game three games a year at least. Who has not?" for the above four players). After the first athlete was eliminated, there was another question about the three remaining, and so on until only one athlete was left on the board. A question about the remaining player was then asked. One point was awarded for each odd man out identified (for a total of four possible points per turn). Typically, each contestant had two rounds of Odd Man Out, so 8 was the maximum possible score.
- Coaching Ladder: Contestants tried to buzz in to correctly identify coaches and managers based on the clue given. The game featured a graphical "coaching ladder" the contestants climbed, indicating how many points they had earned. There were usually two or three rounds. In the two first rounds, each correct response was worth 1 point. In the final round, each correct response was worth 2 points, but an incorrect response took away a point.
- Dodge the Schwab: At the beginning of the game, twelve categories were presented, each about a famous sports figure. Contestants alternated choosing categories to answer. Most categories had questions that were deemed of average difficulty, but some contained hidden "diabolical" Schwab questions that were much more difficult, having been devised by the Schwab himself. If a contestant happened to choose a category that had a Schwab question, they chose to "dodge" it and passed it to the opponent before hearing the question, rather than answering it themselves. Regular questions were worth one point, while Schwab questions were worth 2 points. However, if a contestant got a Schwab question wrong, they lost a point. In season 3, the number of categories was reduced to 8.
- Journey Men: Contestants were given an athlete and an unordered list of teams he had played for. The contestant had to put the teams in chronological order (i.e., for Darryl Strawberry, a contestant was given Giants, Dodgers, Yankees, and Mets. The correct answer was "1, Mets, 2, Dodgers, 3, Giants, 4, Yankees."). Each contestant was given a total of 3 lists, alternating back and forth. They were given 15 seconds for each of the first two lists, and 20 seconds for the third list. Contestants were provided a paper and pen to assist themselves. A point was awarded for each team correctly put in each spot. During the time the contestant wrote down his answers, "The Schwab" made a description of the athlete.
- Stop the Presses: A contestant was given a paragraph of copy that contained one factual error. One point was awarded for identifying the error, and another point for correcting the error. However, if either part of a contestant's answer was wrong, the opponent attempted to steal points by giving the correct answer. An example of a paragraph given was "In January 2005, in the Seattle Seahawks' regular-season finale against the Patriots, Shaun Alexander watched from the sideline as time ran out, and he fell one yard short of Curtis Martin for the NFL rushing title." In this case, the incorrect part was the team "Patriots", which was the Falcons. Usually 3 paragraphs in total were given to each contestant.
- Who's Got More?: A contestant was given a choice of two related statistical categories (e.g., "Career Home Runs" or "Career Stolen Bases") and then was given up to 15 pairs of sports figures and had to name which of the two had achieved more of that category for as many pairs as they could in 40 seconds. Their opponent was then given another 15 pairs of athletes for the other category (also in 40 seconds). In round one, each correct answer was worth 1 point. In round two, each correct answer was worth 2 points.
- Remember When: Contestants alternated having to guess the year that an event from the world of sports took place. Each contestant started with 100 points. For every year off, the contestant lost a point. If the exact year was guessed, the contestant gained a point. The final question given to each contestant was called the "Ultimate Year" and point values were doubled (i.e., 2 points were deducted for every year off, but 2 points were awarded for guessing the year exactly). Whichever player had fewer points going into the "Ultimate Year" questions was given a choice of two categories for their Ultimate Year question, followed by the opponent having to answer the question from the other category. Typically, there were 5 rounds of questions before the "Ultimate Year" questions.
- Over/Under: This was similar to the usual way "Over/Under" style games were played. A contestant was asked a statistical question (e.g., "How many career wins did Cy Young have?") and the Schwab told the contestant if they were right or wrong. If he was right, they were awarded 2 points. If they were wrong, the opponent tried to guess if the correct figure was over or under what was said. If the opponent guessed correctly, they were awarded a point, and if they then stated the correct figure they were given an additional point. "The Schwab" had openly stated that this was the easiest game for contestants and had to be eliminated as they could easily guess.
- On the Record: Contestants were presented with a series of famous sports-related quotes. They had to buzz in if they could identify the author of the quote. However, they had to wait until the entire quote was read before attempting to buzz in. There were two rounds. In the first round, correct answers were worth one point. In the second round, they were worth two points, but an incorrect answer cost a point.
- AKA: Contestants alternated having to guess the name of a famous athlete by their nickname. Each correct answer earned them a point, while an incorrect answer allowed their opponent to steal the point by giving the correct answer.
- Triple Threat: Contestants were shown a picture of an athlete. They then had to guess who the athlete is by giving the exact pronunciation of their name, then by spelling their last name correctly, and finally identify which country they're originally from. Each correct answer was worth one point, but if any part of the contestant's answer was wrong, their opponent could steal the remaining points by giving the remaining correct answers.

In the first season, 2 games were played in round two, with the scores from the first game carried over to the second game.

Whichever contestant had scored the most points at the end of round two went on to face "The Schwab" in the Schwab Showdown.

=== Round 3: The Schwab Showdown ===
When there was just one contestant left, he and "The Schwab" faced off in a one-on-one battle. In this last round, there were four cleverly named categories, each of which dealt with one subject. For example, "Tough Guys" dealt with athletes named Guy, not actual tough guys. Each category had three different cards, each with a question on them. The first question in each category was worth one point, the second two, and the third three. Both the contestant and "The Schwab" were given a pass. If the contestant or "The Schwab" was unsure about an answer to a question, he passed it onto the other player. However, if that player or "The Schwab" still had their pass in possession, they could pass the question right back to the person it was first asked, who then had to answer it. Each incorrect answer was worth one strike, just like baseball, with three strikes ending the round immediately. The game was won either by outscoring the opponent after all questions were asked or by the other player striking out. If the contestant had more points than "The Schwab", then he had "stumped the Schwab."

Originally, the final round was called "The Big Deal", with questions worth 1, 3, and 5 points. Host Scott gave the players poker chips worth the point value of the question they answered correctly. He still placed strike markers in front of the contestant and "The Schwab" as they were accumulated.

In the first season, "stumping the Schwab" got a person a prize of tickets to a sporting event. If their "Schwab Showdown" score was good enough (whether or not they "stumped the Schwab"), they were invited back to participate in a tournament, where the grand prize was a job working alongside "The Schwab" in the research room at ESPN, or tickets for two to five major sports championships. But, that person again had to "stump the Schwab" to win that prize. No one won the grand prize.

In the second season, "stumping the Schwab" won a contestant $5,000 (equivalent to $8,200 in 2025). The semi-finals was contested among those who won the bonus round or finished with a high enough score. Those nine players had a chance at another $5,000 prize in the "Schwab Showdown", as well as a chance at the Grand Championship. If they stumped him once more in the championship round, they won a grand prize of $25,000. Adam Garfield of Pennsylvania won season two. The finals came down to one question and "The Schwab" answered it correctly. Adam won a trip to the 2005 ESPY Awards in Los Angeles as a consolation prize.

In the third season, the contestant who made it to the "Schwab Showdown" earned $1,000 (equivalent to $1,600 in 2025). If that contestant "stumped the Schwab", he earned an additional $5,000 and a guaranteed spot in the semifinals. If they "stumped the Schwab" in the semifinals, it was worth $15,000 (equivalent to $25,000 in 2025). A finals win earned $30,000, so theoretically, a contestant won up to $53,000 ($1,000 for each of the game wins + $5,000 + $15,000 + $30,000). Once again, however, at the end of the season, "The Schwab" won the final "Schwab Showdown", defeating Pete Fierro.

The fourth and final season saw several scoring changes. The $1,000 for winning the game stayed intact through all the rounds, but a win in the "Schwab Showdown" in the first round only netted the contestant an additional $1,000. In the semifinals, that went up to $5,000 for a win in the "Schwab Showdown." In the championship show, the winner of the game played the "Schwab Showdown" for a cash jackpot which started at $9,000, and had money added to it every time "The Schwab" won the "Schwab Showdown." The pot, which reached $30,000, was not won, with "The Schwab" defeating Marty Asalone.

In an episode that aired on May 24, 2005, "The Schwab" struck out for the very first time in the show's history, losing to a senior at Johns Hopkins University named Stephen Shukie ("The Schwab" is an alumnus of St. John's University) in the first college edition of the show. "The Schwab" only scored two points (two correct one point answers) in the whole round, while his opponent scored just four. In the same episode, it was the first time that the contestants (Shukie of Johns Hopkins University, Alec Tolivaisa of Worcester Polytechnic Institute, and Jonathan Evans of Tulane University) and "The Schwab" swept an entire Leading Off category (current AFC Head Coaches) without an incorrect answer.

If there was a tie at the end of any of the three rounds, then Stuart Scott asked a tiebreaker question, where the answer was a number. The person closest to that number won.

== Reception ==
Charlotte Sun television critic Rob Shore praised the show, writing, "The host is Stuart Scott, who seems to have toned down his act from his unbearable Dream Job. Scott seems fast on his way to becoming ESPN's version of Peter Tomarken. He's tolerable here, maybe because he realizes he's not the star of the show, The Schwab is. Stump The Schwab is worth watching, and if ESPN must continue to produce game shows, this is a good one."

In his positive review of the show, David Blum of The New York Sun stated, "the Schwab has no charm whatsoever; he looks like someone you'd be disappointed to find as your dinner party seatmate, or next to you on a cross-country plane trip. But that's exactly what makes the Schwab such a compelling television persona, and what makes Stump the Schwab one of the best game shows on television." The New York Times's Marc Weingarten said, "The appeal of the show lies in its carefully cultivated reverse snobbery. Watching Mr. Schwab gun down all comers is a bit like watching Homer Simpson prevail over Ken Jennings, the all-time "Jeopardy!" champion, in a college quiz bowl."
