= Melissa Coates =

Canadian professional wrestler and model (1969–2021)

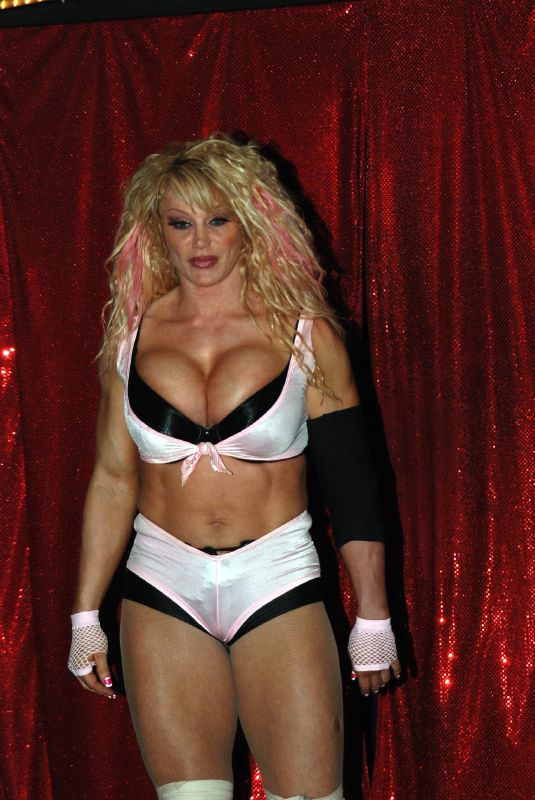
- Coates in 2007

Personal information
- Born: June 18, 1969 Thunder Bay, Ontario, Canada
- Died: June 23, 2021 (age 52) Las Vegas, Nevada, U.S.
- Education: Lakehead University

Professional wrestling career
- Ring name(s): Melissa Coates; The Bag Lady; Mistress Melissa; Super Genie; Mile High Melissa
- Billed height: 5 ft 5 in (1.65 m)
- Billed weight: 150 lb (68 kg)
- Billed from: Los Angeles, California U.S.
- Trained by: Killer Kowalski; Ultimate Pro Wrestling; Ohio Valley Wrestling; Wild Samoan Training Center; Deep South Wrestling; NWA Anarchy
- Debut: 2002
- Retired: 2020
- Professional bodybuilder

Best statistics

Professional (Pro) career
- Pro-debut: IFBB Jan Tana Classic; 1996
- Best win: IFBB Jan Tana Classic champion; 1996
- Predecessor: Sue Gafner
- Successor: Chris Bongiovannii

Melissa Lavinia Coates (June 18, 1969 – June 23, 2021) was a Canadian professional wrestler, bodybuilder, fitness model, and actress. She was best known for appearing in the first two seasons of the Game Show Network show Extreme Dodgeball. In professional wrestling, she was known for her appearances in World Wrestling Entertainment's developmental territories Ohio Valley Wrestling and Deep South Wrestling, NWA Anarchy, and Women Superstars Uncensored. On the independent circuit, she was the valet of Sabu, under the ring name Super Genie.

== Bodybuilding ==
Prior to entering professional wrestling, Coates aspired to become a professional tennis player after watching Martina Navratilova. To train for tennis, Coates began weightlifting at 15, At that time she entered her first tennis competition in 1984, where she remained until the finals. She re-entered the following year and won the Mid-Canada Junior Girls Championship. She soon began to shift her attention from tennis to bodybuilding. She entered her first contest in the early 1990s, where she won the overall lightweight category of the Windsor Physique Contest. After gaining prominence, Coates moved to Los Angeles and worked for two gyms and two bars to support herself. After earning pro status by winning her class at the 1994 Canadian Championships, she won the Jan Tana Classic in 1996, which was her professional bodybuilding debut. In 1999, she took a leave from bodybuilding and subsequently began working as a model.

Coates competed in the first two seasons of Extreme Dodgeball on the Game Show Network. Her team, the Barbell Mafia team, qualified for the playoffs in the first season, but failed to qualify the next year.

== Professional wrestling career ==
=== Early career (2002–2006) ===
After training at both Killer Kowalski's training school and Ultimate Pro Wrestling's Ultimate University. In 2005, Coates made an appearance in the Naked Women's Wrestling League (NWWL), hosted by Carmen Electra. Coates wrestled April Hunter, in which both wrestlers appeared completely nude.

=== WWE developmental system (2005–2007) ===
Coates moved down to Louisville, Kentucky to begin training in World Wrestling Entertainment (WWE)'s developmental territory Ohio Valley Wrestling. Coates then made an appearance at WWE's Backlash, taking part in Chris Masters' "Master Lock Challenge" segment, where he offered $3,000 to anyone who could break his Master Lock, which she failed to do. She was then placed in OVW as an official trainee and became the "head of security" for Kenny Bolin's stable "Bolin's Services". Soon after, however, Coates left both OVW and WWE and went to work for World Xtreme Wrestling.

Coates returned to OVW, albeit not under a WWE developmental contract. Upon resuming, she soon began facing off with several of the OVW Divas, including Beth Phoenix, Mickie James, Melina Perez. Coates later turned heel and began managing the OVW Southern Tag Team Champions Blonde Bombers (Tank and Chad Toland), as well as becoming Jillian Hall's bodyguard and went on a spree of blinding people with rubbing alcohol in storyline.

After training in OVW, Coates then moved over to Deep South Wrestling and debuted for the territory as The Bag Lady, a homeless woman who became the love interest and eventually the valet of The Freakin' Deacon. On February 22, 2007, the Bag Lady debuted a new Diva-esque look and defeated Angel Williams in their subsequent match. The Bag Lady then began feuding with both Williams and Krissy Vaine. On the April 5 episode of DSW TV Tapings, The Bag Lady accompanied Nattie Neidhart to the ring where she lost to Krissy Vaine after the distraction by Williams followed by Vaine using the heel of a shoe.

In March 2015, Devon Nicholson described an incident from 2006 that Bill DeMott was involved with while he was head trainer for the WWE's Deep South Wrestling developmental territory. Nicholson described an incident where Drew Hankinson was completely naked in the ring for a long period of time and gave naked stinkfaces to Coates and Matt Cardona while DeMott held jelly donuts over their faces. The wrestlers agreed to do this (with the other talent encouraging them) to get out of regular training for that day. DeMott refuted the notion that it was his idea, stating that the other trainees came up with it because they wanted to skip the session.

=== NWA Anarchy (2007–2008) ===
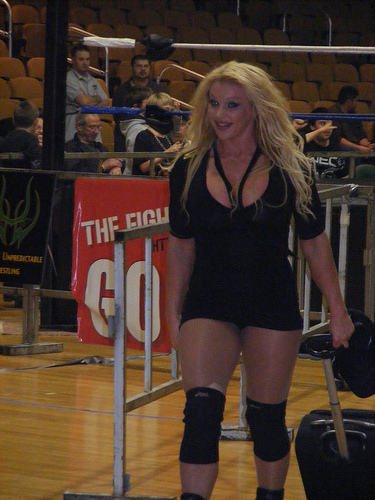
Coates, as Mile High Melissa, in 2008

In her first appearances on the indy circuit after leaving DSW, Coates made her debut for Great Championship Wrestling on May 29 and defeated Daffney to win the NWA/GCW Women's Championship, her first professional wrestling championship. Coates continued to remain champion until the title was seemingly forgotten and then deactivated in late 2007. Coates also made several appearances for other Georgia-based wrestling promotions in both a wrestling and managerial role. On July 7, she made her debut for NWA Anarchy as a heel, challenging and defeating several male wrestlers in intergender matches. At NWA Anarchy's Fright Night event, Coates teamed up with fellow DSW alumnus Tony Santarelli to defeat Todd Sexton and referee Wes Grissom, the latter of whom Coates was feuding with.

On December 15, Coates began an angle with Don Matthews after Coates attacked Matthews and his tag team partner Brodie Chase. All three were then entered into an Anarchy Battle Royal to determine the number one contender for the Television Championship, but both Coates and Matthews were simultaneously eliminated and Matthews began showing affection towards her. On December 29, Matthews publicly declared his affection towards Coates before she struck him in response. The angle between the two continued until Matthews' tag team partner Brodie Chase revealed that he and Coates were together, turning Chase heel in the process. On May 31, 2008, Chase defeated Matthews while having Coates in his corner. While working outside of NWA Anarchy, Coates took on a managerial role in April 2008. Using the ring name Mile High Melissa, Coates adopted a flight attendant gimmick and joined "Captain" Mike Flyte, with the pair collectively known as The Flight Crew. In July 2008, they were joined by "Captain" Jason Static, though Static left the stable after a few months before Coates left NWA Anarchy.

=== Women Superstars Uncensored (2008–2010) ===
On August 23, 2008, Coates made her debut in Women Superstars Uncensored as a villainess and defeated Autumn Breeze in her debut match. Beginning in October, she formed a tag team called the Badass Beauties with Trixxie Lynn. The team made its debut on October 10 in a victory over Annie Social and Sean Hanson pinning Hanson. The following day, the Badass Beauties lost to the Beatdown Betties (Roxxie Cotton and Annie Social) in the first round of a tournament for the vacant Tag Team Championship. After winning a number of singles matches throughout 2009, Coates gained a title match with the WSU Champion Mercedes Martinez April 3, 2010, but was unsuccessful in winning the title. On November 6, Coates wrestled in a six-person gauntlet match for the company's unsanctioned All Guts, No Glory Championship, but was unsuccessful as Angel Orsini, the title's creator and holder, retained the title. Coates left the company shortly after.

=== Funking Conservatory (2008–2010) ===
On December 31, 2008, Coates made her Funking Conservatory debut on !Bang! TV at their Hell's Bells event, where she was unsuccessful in defeating Claudia "The Claw" Reiff for the Funking Conservatory Women's Championship. On May 3, 2009, she returned to the promotion for their Hard-Core Brawl event and lost an intergender tag team match with Blain Rage to Reiff and Johnny Romano. On September 5 at Fall Brawl, Coates and Reiff lost to The Wasilla Wrecking Crew (Charlotte Mahoy and Rachael Moore) in a match for the Funking Conservatory Women's Tag Team Championship. At Morbid Power on October 17, she and Reiff defeated The Wasilla Wrecking Crew for the Women's Tag Team Title. Despite being partners, Coates and Reiff wrestled in a three-way match for Reiff's Women's Title that also involved then-champion Rachael Moore at Turkey Shoot on November 21, which Moore won to retain the title. On December 31 at Hell's Bells, Coates competed in a gauntlet match for the Women's Championship, but was unable to win as Reiff reclaimed the title. Following this, Coates left !Bang! at the beginning of 2010, resulting in the Women's Tag Team Title being vacated in the process.

=== Independent circuit (2011–2021) ===
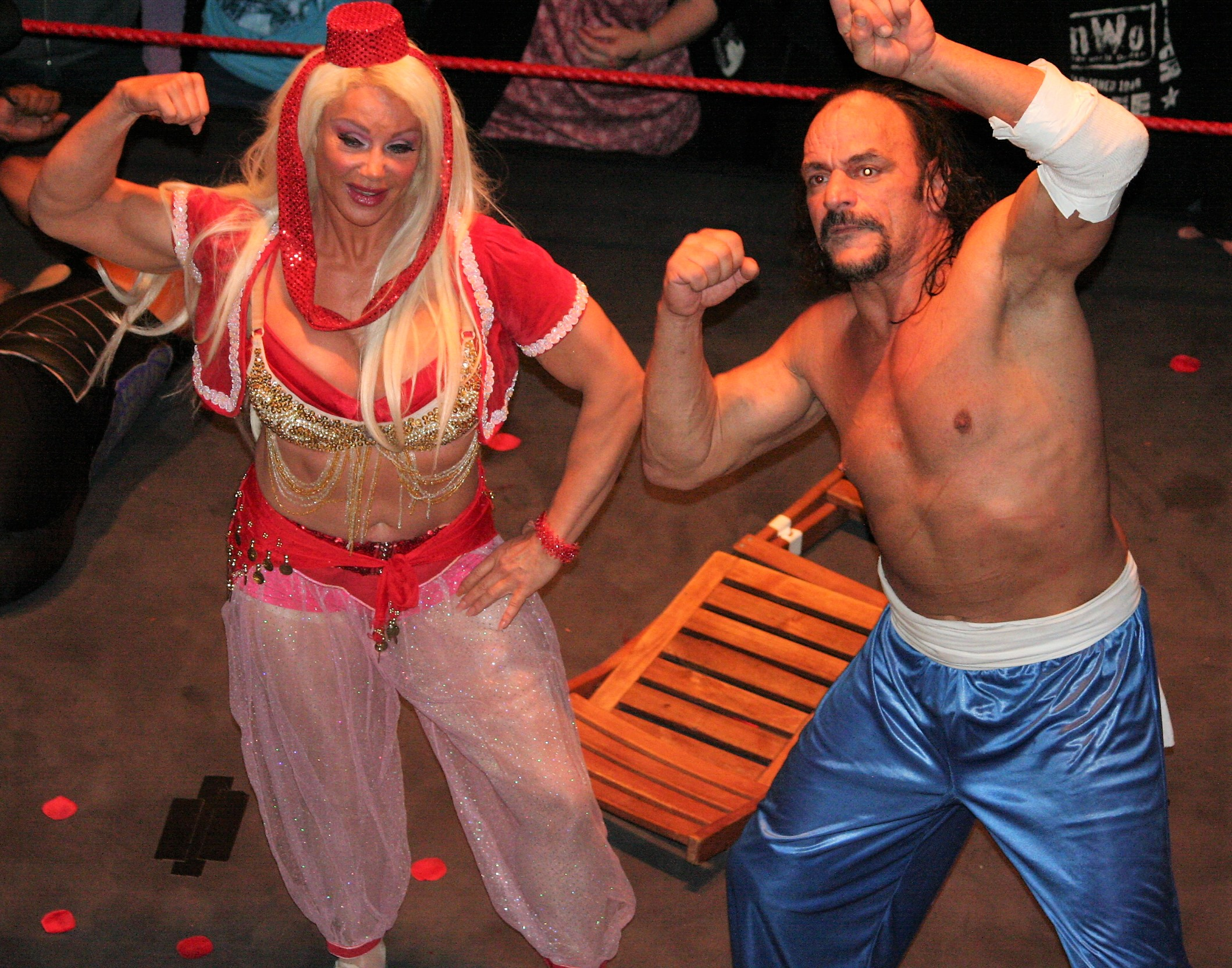
Coates, in character as The Super Genie, with Sabu in 2017

After leaving Women Superstars Uncensored, Coates began competing on the independent circuit throughout 2011 before taking a hiatus due to requiring knee surgery. On February 4, 2012, Coates made her debut for the Michigan Championship Wrestling Association in a mixed tag team match, where she teamed with Tyler Elkins to defeat Sybil Starr and Brian Castle. As a result of gaining the pinfall for her team, Coates was granted a match against the Bombshell's Champion Arella Angel. On March 3, Coates defeated Angel to win the Bombshell's Title. Soon after the victory, Coates left the MCWA, leading to the Bombshell's Title being vacated in the process. On June 15, 2012, Coates defeated Stacy Shadows to win the Brew City Wrestling Women's Championship, ending Shadows' near two year-long championship reign. Coates would go on to hold the title for over three months before losing it back to Shadows on September 21 in a three-way match also involving Melanie Cruise. On November 15, 2014, Coates began managing Sabu, complete with the nickname "The Super Genie".

== Personal life and death ==
Coates' mother was a nurse and amateur actress and bodybuilder, and her father is a doctor. She was the youngest of four children, having a sister and two brothers. She earned a Bachelor of Science in biology from Lakehead University, originally seeking to be a veterinarian.

In the mid-2010s, Coates began dating fellow professional wrestler Terry Brunk (best known as Sabu), as well as becoming his wrestling valet under the ring name Super Genie.

On November 12, 2020, a GoFundMe page was created on her behalf. Coates was experiencing excruciating pain in her left leg from the effects of COVID-19. She was admitted to University Medical Center in Las Vegas, where doctors observed several blood clots in her leg. Despite several procedures to save her leg, doctors found that the blood clots were spreading and were life-threatening. Thus, doctors needed to perform life-saving surgery: the amputation of her left leg above the knee. Due to this medical emergency, Coates incurred substantial medical expenses and was out of work for an indefinite amount of time during rehabilitation.

Coates died in her sleep from COVID-19 complications on June 23, 2021, aged 52.

== Other media ==
=== Filmography ===
- Pray Another Day (2003)
- Ultimate Death Match 2 (2010) as herself
- A Story About Ian (2011) as "Female Bodybuilder"

=== Television appearances ===
- Extreme Dodgeball (2004) as herself
- Traveling the Stars: Action Bronson and Friends Watch 'Ancient Aliens': Alien Devastation (2016) as "Super Genie"

== Championships and accomplishments ==
=== Bodybuilding ===
- 1991 Windsor Physique – 1st (LW)
- 1992 Eastern Ontario – 1st (MW)
- 1993 Ontario – 1st (MW)
- 1994 Canadian Championships – 1st (MW)
- 1996 Jan Tana Classic – 1st (Overall)
- 1996 IFBB Ms. Olympia – 9th
- 1997 IFBB Ms. International – 6th
- 1997 IFBB Ms. Olympia – 11th
- 1999 IFBB Ms. International – 13th

=== Professional wrestling ===
- Brew City Wrestling
  - BCW Women's Championship (1 time)
- Dragon Con
  - Dragon Con Women's Championship (1 time)
- Funking Conservatory
  - FC Women's Tag Team Championship (1 time) – with Claudia Reiff
- Great Championship Wrestling
  - NWA/GCW Women's Championship (1 time)
- Indiana Universal Wrestling Association
  - IUWA Diva's Championship (1 time)
- Michigan Championship Wrestling Association
  - MCWA Bombshell's Championship (1 time)
- Pro Wrestling Illustrated
  - Ranked No. 41 of the top 50 female wrestlers in the PWI Female 50 in 2010
