= Rich Cronin (executive) =

American businessman

Richard Cronin is an American media consultant and former cable television executive. In 2007, he started a Los Angeles-based consultancy, Cronin Industries, after serving six years, since May 2001, as president and chief executive of the Game Show Network.

== Career ==
Beginning on 1 July 1998, Cronin was president and chief executive of Fox Kids Network and Fox Family Channel. He left the company in 2000. Cronin led these networks following a New York Supreme Court ruling that he could not take up the new positions until his contract expired with Viacom's MTV Networks, where he was president of TV Land.

He left as president of TV Land in October 1997 after signing with the Saban Entertainment and News Corporation Fox venture. Before launching TV Land, Cronin was Senior Vice President and General Manager of Nick at Nite and Senior Vice President of Marketing for Nickelodeon.
