= Mike Hall (sportscaster) =

American sports broadcaster (born 1982)

Michael James Hall (born February 20, 1982, in Glen Ellyn, Illinois) is an American sports broadcaster who works for the Big Ten Network. He can also be found as a sideline reporter for National Football League (NFL) games on Fox. Hall is a graduate of the University of Missouri where he majored in journalism.

== Biography ==
=== Dream Job ===
Hall is perhaps best known for being the winner of the first season of ESPN's reality television show Dream Job. For his efforts, Hall won a one-year contract to be an anchor on ESPN's popular sports news program SportsCenter and a new Mazda 3. On the night that he won, March 28, 2004, Hall also took a sports quiz to raise his salary. His salary started at $70,000. He then answered five trivia questions, each correct answer worth $5,000, to bump his first-year salary to $95,000.

=== ESPN ===
On May 15, 2004, Hall graduated from the University of Missouri. At 1 a.m. Eastern Daylight Time on July 20, 2004, Hall began his stint as an official SportsCenter anchor alongside Linda Cohn, having already done some work for ESPNews. Before Missouri, he attended historic Glenbard West High School. Hall also appeared on ESPN, and occasionally ESPN2, broadcasting college games including the Division I NCAA Frozen Four National Championship. He used to be the featured on-air personality at ESPN's network devoted to college sports, ESPNU. On March 4, 2005, he was the opening promo for the first ever program on ESPNU, a basketball game at Gallagher-Iba arena on the campus of Oklahoma State University (OSU) between OSU and Texas. ESPN's Pardon the Interruption reported during its "Happy Trails!" segment on April 27, 2007, that Hall was leaving ESPNU to move back to the Chicago area, where he would pursue other job opportunities.

=== Big Ten Network and Fox Sports ===
Beginning in 2007, Hall is employed with the Big Ten Network. While at the network, Hall has hosted signature programs including Big Ten football pregames/halftimes/postgames, Friday Night Tailgate, Big Ten Football Report, BTN Live on Sirius/XM satellite radio, Big Ten Basketball & Beyond and Big Ten Basketball pre-game, halftime, and wrap-up segments.

Hall also makes appearances doing sideline reporting for The NFL on Fox. as well as for the network's coverage of the Big Ten men's basketball tournament.

In 2016 the network gave Hall his own late night comedy show, Sports Lite. It was a sports twist on "The Soup" where he did a monologue in front of a live studio audience, and aired feature pieces with him in the field showing athlete's goofing off with him, as well as utilizing comedians in NYC and LA interviewing famous Big Ten fans.

=== Improv comedy ===
Hall performed improv comedy at iO Chicago for more than a decade with various teams including Wonderbat (co-starring SNL's Alex Moffat), Electric Mayhem, and Coup de Grace and at The Playground with Boyish. He frequently would be seen showing up at Second City to do guest performances during the improv sets.
