= Al Jaffe =

American media executive

Al Jaffe was ESPN's vice-president of talent (official title: Vice-president of Talent Negotiation and Production Recruitment), from 1996 until his retirement in January 2015. He joined ESPN in 1987. He was also one of the judges on all three seasons of the network's reality series Dream Job.

A native of Pittsfield, Massachusetts he is a 1968 graduate of Emerson College, where he majored in Mass Communications and where he later served as a member of the school’s Board of Trustees from 2007 through 2024. Jaffe previously served as a news producer at WHDH-TV and WCVB-TV in Boston, and as News Director at KNTV-TV San Jose, California, and KOVR-TV in Sacramento.

In 2019, Jaffe was voted President of the Ivoryton (CT) Playhouse Board of Trustees.

== Awards ==
He was elected to the Emerson College Board of Trustees in 2007 and was inducted into the WERS (Emerson College Radio Station) Hall of Fame in 2011. Emerson awarded him an honorary Doctor of Humane Letters degree at the college’s commencement in May of 2024.

== Family ==
Jaffe met his wife Kathleen when they were both working at WCVB and they have been married since 1972. They have two children, David and Pam. His daughter Pam Jaffe Clark also attended Emerson College and graduated in May 2007. She is currently a Video Editor on the WE-TV reality show Braxton Family Values.

== Awards and honors ==
- 1978 – Emmy Award, Boston chapter of National Academy of Television Arts and Sciences, Best Newscast (WCVB-TV)
- 1986 – Radio Television News Directors Association Award, Regional Investigative Reporting (KOVR)
- 2024 —- Honorary Doctor of Humane Letters, Emerson College
