= Uniontown, Ohio =

- CDP
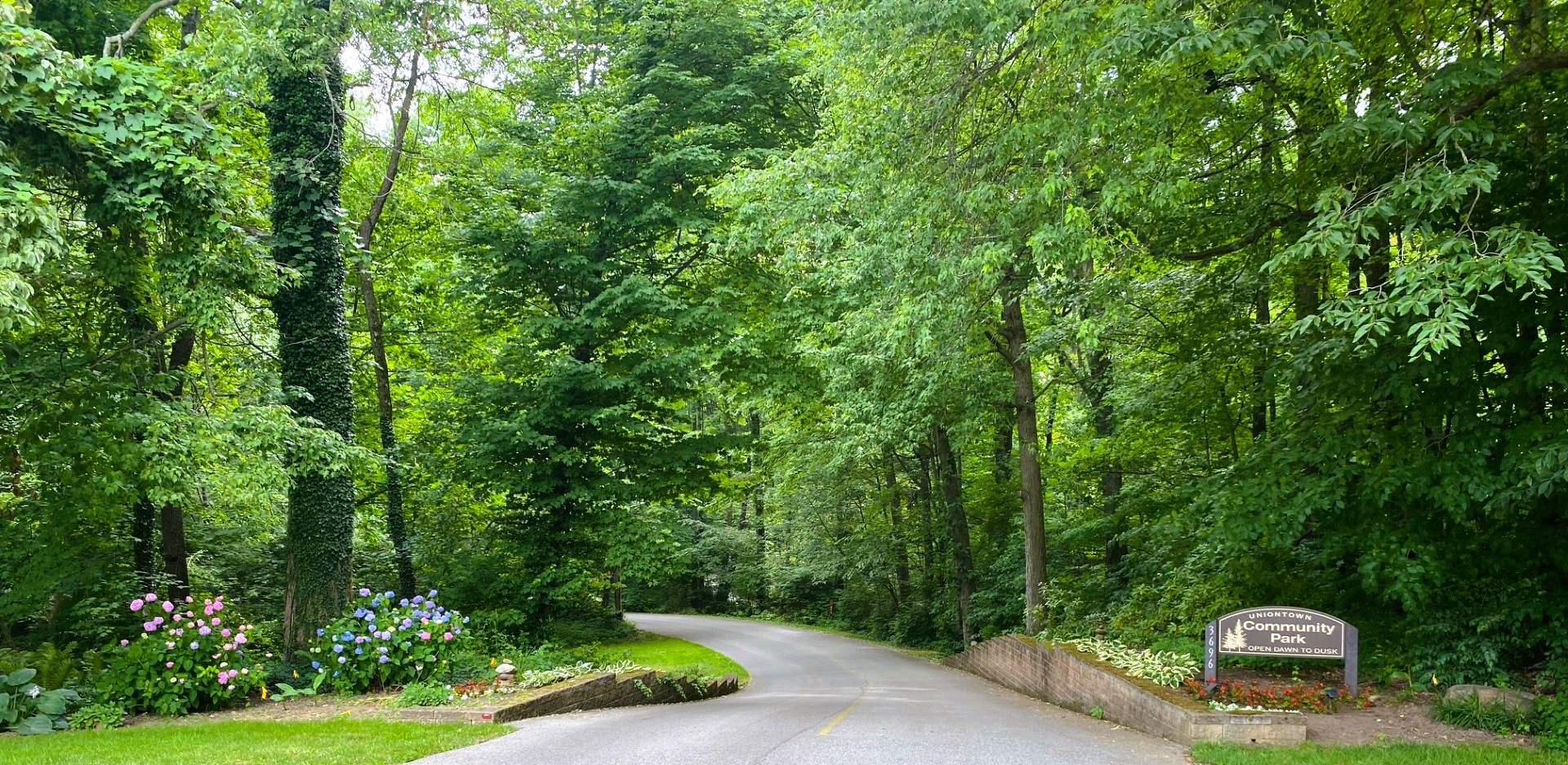

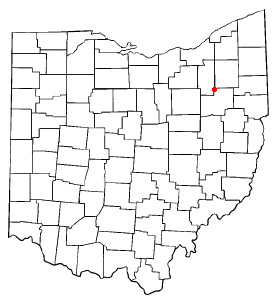
- Location of Uniontown, Ohio

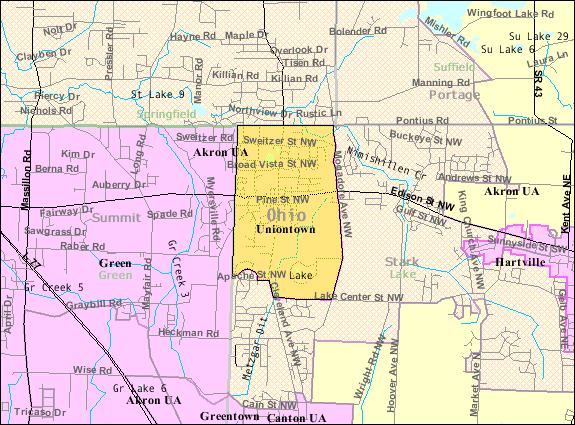
- Detailed map of Uniontown
- Coordinates: 40°57′48″N 81°24′22″W
- Country: United States
- State: Ohio
- County: Stark; Summit
- Township: Lake

Area
  - Total: 4.20 sq mi (10.89 km^{2})
  - Land: 4.18 sq mi (10.83 km^{2})
  - Water: 0.023 sq mi (0.06 km^{2})
- Elevation: 1,132 ft (345 m)

Population (2020)
  - Total: 7,173
  - Density: 1,715.1/sq mi (662.21/km^{2})
- Time zone: UTC-5 (Eastern (EST))
  - Summer (DST): UTC-4 (EDT)
- ZIP code: 44685
- Area code: 330
- FIPS code: 39-78736
- GNIS feature ID: 2393262

Uniontown is a census-designated place (CDP) in Stark County, Ohio, United States. The population was 7,173 at the 2020 census.

The Industrial Excess Landfill, now a superfund site, is located south of Uniontown.

Uniontown is part of the Canton-Massillon, OH Metropolitan Statistical Area.

== History ==
Uniontown was platted in 1816. Two stagecoach lines which met near the original town site caused the name "Union" to be selected. By the 1830s, Uniontown had a church, schoolhouse, tannery, tavern, and two stores. In 1880, the Valley Railroad through Myersville caused businesses to move away, so Unionville became more residential. In 1904 trolleys connected Uniontown with Greentown, Cleveland and Canton. Uniontown never incorporated.

A post office called Uniontown has been in operation since 1920.

== Superfund site ==
A pit from prior sand and gravel mining was turned into a landfill in 1966, the Industrial Excess Landfill (IEL), which accepted solid and liquid waste of Akron's rubber industry as well as black shale and coal ash, military waste, and various other industrial wastes including plutonium, according to former landfill owner Charles Kittinger. The 30 acre landfill closed in 1980 and left soil and groundwater contamination behind, with recurring plumes of toxic vapors for years to come. In 1983, concerned citizens raised the issue of health effects from IEL's contamination. EPA listed IEL as a Superfund site in 1984. They determined that a toxic plume moved in a radial pattern away from the site in all directions. A soil vapor intrusion control system was installed in areas where residents could not be evacuated. In 1989, EPA hired Tetra Tech to conduct cleanup efforts. In 2004, EPA considered the clean-up finished and shut down monitoring wells.

The potentially responsible parties include Firestone (company), General Tire, Goodrich, and Goodyear. They did not pay for remedial investigations or cleanup, only proposed a layer of grass for natural attenuation.

== Geography ==
Uniontown is located in northeastern Ohio, about 30 miles south of Cleveland and within the Akron-Canton metropolitan area. Uniontown is spread along the Tuscarawas River.

According to the United States Census Bureau, the CDP has a total area of 2.5 square miles (6.5 km^{2}), of which 2.5 square miles (6.5 km^{2}) is land and 0.04 square miles (0.10 km^{2}) (0.79%) is water.

== Demographics ==
Historical population
Census	Pop.	Note	%±
2020	7,173		—
U.S. Decennial Census

Uniontown is part of the Canton-Massillon, OH Metropolitan Statistical Area. At the 2000 census there were 2,802 people, 1,141 households, and 861 families in the CDP. The population density was 1,122.5 inhabitants per square mile (433.4/km^{2}). There were 1,171 housing units at an average density of 469.1 per square mile (181.1/km^{2}). The racial makeup of the CDP was 98.14% White, 0.32% African American, 0.14% Native American, 0.54% Asian, 0.14% from other races, and 0.71% from two or more races. Hispanic or Latino of any race were 0.50%.

Of the 1,141 households 26.2% had children under the age of 18 living with them, 65.7% were married couples living together, 7.4% had a female householder with no husband present, and 24.5% were non-families. 21.5% of households were one person and 10.2% were one person aged 65 or older. The average household size was 2.46 and the average family size was 2.86.

The age distribution was 20.9% under the age of 18, 5.9% from 18 to 24, 24.6% from 25 to 44, 30.3% from 45 to 64, and 18.3% 65 or older. The median age was 44 years. For every 100 females there were 90.4 males. For every 100 females age 18 and over, there were 88.5 males.

The median household income was $47,206 and the median family income was $60,510. Males had a median income of $45,212 versus $28,625 for females. The per capita income for the CDP was $23,108. About 0.8% of families and 2.7% of the population were below the poverty line, including none of those under age 18 and 4.2% of those age 65 or over.

== Education ==
Uniontown has a public library, a branch of Stark County District Library.
