= ESPNews Gametime =

- Country of origin: United States

Production
- Running time: 4 hours

Original release
- Network: ESPNews
- Release: September 5, 2006 – January 2, 2009

ESPNews Gametime is a news/analysis and up to the minute highlight show that airs on ESPNews. Debuting on September 5, 2006, the program aired nightly from 8 p.m. ET-12 a.m. ET. On Fridays, it was pushed back one hour to make room for Football Friday (which was also discontinued). Gametime, as they call it for short, replaced ESPNews Early Evening (which is still seen on weekends), which is regular news and highlights. ESPNews Gametime was made up of 30-minute blocks throughout the program.

During the show, the two anchors for that night updated scores, highlights and were joined by analysts to discuss different topics, show live postgame press conferences and player comments, were joined by players via phone and go over all of the top stories of the day.

On 2008-03-31, the 11-11:30 p.m. ET block of Gametime was replaced by The Highlight Zone, a new program devoted to sports highlights and scores, similar to FSN's Final Score.

ESPNews Gametime was discontinued after January 2, 2009 as ESPNews reverted to half-hour blocks throughout the day beginning January 5, 2009.

== Anchors ==
Anchors who appear on the show include:

- Steve Berthiaume
- Michelle Bonner
- Cindy Brunson
- John Buccigross
- Steve Bunin
- Ryan Burr
- Reischea Canidate
- Jonathan Coachman
- Linda Cohn
- Robert Flores
- Fred Hickman
- Mike Hill
- Michael Kim
- Mark Morgan
- Kevin Neghandi
- Dari Nowkhah
- Bill Pidto
- Scott Reiss (left network in 2008)
- John Seibel
- Will Selva
- Anish Shroff
- J.W. Stewart
- Matt Winer

== Segments ==
- Opening: At the start of every thirty-minute block, it goes through the intro music and graphics and then the anchors introduce themselves and they get right into it.
- News Wired: This segment is featured every thirty minutes, when the anchors give you three or four of the biggest news stories at the hour.
- Pre-Game Extra: This is when they go live to a game site, where the game announcers are assigned to call the game on the ESPN networks (such as ESPN on ABC). The announcers preview the game that is coming up later that night.
- Post-Game Extra: This is when they go live to a game site for instant reaction from the locker room or during the press conference.
- In-Game Updates: This segment is when the anchors inform viewers with highlights or a box-score when something big happens in a game.
- In-Game Extra: This segment is when the anchors take viewers to a game currently in progress, such as a college basketball game broadcast by an ESPN (or another) network.
- What 2 Watch 4: This segment, which is also used on SportsCenter, runs down three or four of the biggest games coming up at a later time.
- Breaking News: This segment is when they inform you of a news story that has just been released.
- Highlights: The show's highlights tend to be longer than the ones on SportsCenter running down all of the big plays and at the end they show a full screen of stats and scores and information on that game.
- Top Plays: Unlike the ones used on SportsCenter, the top plays of the day in sports used on ESPNews are limited to just 3 highlights.
- Monday Night NASCAR: Seen on Mondays during the 8 p.m. ET half-hour of Gametime, with a recap of the weekend's NASCAR Nationwide Series and Sprint Cup races.
- Hockey Night: Seen on Thursdays in the 10:30 p.m. ET half-hour during the NHL season, with ESPN's NHL analyst Barry Melrose.

== See also ==
- List of ESPNews personalities
