= The Hot List =

- Starring: David Lloyd and various co-anchors
- Country of origin: United States

Production
- Running time: 3 hours

Original release
- Network: ESPNEWS (2003-2009)
- Release: January 2004 – January 2, 2009

The Hot List (also styled HotList) was a news, talk and analysis television show and also the flagship program on ESPNEWS. Since its debut in January 2004, the program aired Monday through Friday from 3-6pm ET.

== About the show ==
The show originally consisted of one host (David Lloyd), along with an update anchor, who delivers news updates every thirty minutes. The show has since switched to a dual-anchor format, with Lloyd being joined by a rotating co-anchor. Cindy Brunson and Bram Weinstein are common co-hosts. Throughout the program, Lloyd and a rotating co-anchor are joined by analysts, players and insiders to break down and discuss the top stories in the sports world. The Hot List is also sometimes shown as a simulcast on ESPN and/or ESPN2.

From the show's debut until September 2006, Brian Kenny hosted the show. In October 2006, he became an anchor on SportsCenter, and was replaced on The Hot List by Elliott and Bunin, who had been substitutes for Kenny in the past. However, beginning in August 2007, David Lloyd, who had been the host on ESPNEWS Pregame, took over as the permanent host. Michael Kim had been the primary update anchor since 2004, but Ben Becker has also served in that role. In the spring of 2008, the show's current dual-anchor format was adopted.

In 2006, two special edition five-hour shows debuted. On Mondays during the NFL season, an extended five-hour show began at 1pm ET to kick off ESPN's coverage of Monday Night Football with Josh Elliott and Mike Hill co-hosting and Eric Allen and Qadry Ismail as analysts. This replaced Monday Quarterback which was hosted by Trey Wingo with Mike Ditka and Eric Allen. On Thursdays, the show aired a special college football preview show, again five hours with Dari Nowkhah hosting along with analysts Jim Donnan and Lou Holtz.

The Hot List was discontinued on January 2, 2009 as ESPNEWS reverted to half-hour blocks of sports news throughout the day on January 5, 2009.

== Personalities ==
- David Lloyd: Host (2007–2009)
- Aaron Boulding: Videogame Analyst (2005–2009)
- Steve Bunin: Fill-In Host (2006–2009)
- Josh Elliott: Fill-In Host (2006–2009)
- Mike Hill : Fill-In Host (2006–2009)
- Michael Kim: Update Anchor (2004–2009)
- Kevin Negandhi: Fill-in Host (2005–2009)
- Ben Becker: Fill-In Host and Fill-In Update Anchor (2005–2007)
- Brian Kenny: Host (2004–2006)

== Segments ==
- Sports Hit List: This is at the top of each hour when Lloyd delivers all of the hottest stories in sports.
- News and Notes: This segment was originally done by Michael Kim (and now by Lloyd's co-anchor), when s/he gives the viewers all of the news and notes in the sports world.
