= The Blitz (TV program) =

American sports television program

The Blitz is an American television sports program which consists of scores and highlights of NFL games. It debuted on ESPNEWS on the first day of the 2005 NFL season, September 11, 2005. It airs mainly during the NFL season on Sundays, from 1:00pm ET to 10:00pm ET. This program is currently on hiatus.

== Format ==
This program used two different formats, as shown below:

=== During NFL season ===
When The Blitz debuted in 2005, it originally consisted of scores and highlights of NFL games around the country, along with analysis from Qadry Ismail, Mike Ditka, and Sean Salisbury. The Blitz also had some non-football highlights (such as college basketball, the NBA, and the like) mixed in. The program went off the air the week after the Super Bowl XL in 2006, and returned on September 10 of that same year. The Blitz would eventually replace the Sunday afternoon and evening editions of "ESPNEWS" (which previously aired on Sundays) from that point until February 3, 2008. The Blitz reverted to this format used during the NFL season on September 9, 2007.

The Blitz went off the air for the season on February 3, 2008.

=== During all other times ===
On February 18, 2007, The Blitz debuted an alternate program logo, along with a second format that was used all other times (similar to the ones used on the other ESPNEWS programs, such as ESPNEWS Gametime). And with that, it also replaced programming previously aired from 1:00pm to 10:00pm ET (ESPNEWS Day and ESPNEWS Early Evening). This format has been discontinued as of September 2, 2007 as the network has reverted to its original Sunday programming lineup (ESPNEWS Day and ESPNEWS Early Evening) on February 10, 2008.

== The Blitz anchor roster ==
Some of the anchors who appeared on The Blitz included:

- Linda Cohn
- Robert Flores
- Mike Hill
- Dari Nowkhah
- Bill Pidto
- Sage Steele
- J.W. Stewart
