= ESPNews Pregame =

ESPNews Pregame is a sports news program that aired Monday-Friday at 6pm Eastern Time on the American cable channel ESPNews. This program, which was originally hosted by David Lloyd, debuted on September 5, 2006 in its original timeslot of 7pm ET as part of the sports news network's significant weekday evening programming overhaul.

Original host David Lloyd left ESPNews Pregame in 2007 to take over the co-hosting duties of The Hot List. After Lloyd's departure, several personalities, most notably Michelle Bonner, hosted this show. The series ended in 2009.

== Program format ==
Originally airing as a one-hour program, this two-hour show looked at all the day's news around the world of sports and sets the table for the evening's sports lineup, and features analysis, interviews, highlights, and more.

== Program history ==
ESPNews Pregame replaced 4 Qtrs (also anchored by Lloyd) in the 7pm ET timeslot. On July 21, 2008, this program expanded to two hours as it moved up an hour to the 6pm ET timeslot, replacing the re-airings of Around the Horn and Pardon the Interruption (both of which moved to sister channel ESPN2 in the same timeslot). In addition to the expansion of the current two-hour format, ESPNews Pregame has switched to a dual-anchor format as well, just like most of the network's other programs, such as The Hot List and Gametime. The show had its series finale on January 2, 2009 as ESPNews reverted to half-hour blocks of sports news throughout the day beginning January 5, 2009.

== See also ==
- ESPNews Gametime
