= NHL 2Night =

- Starring: Bill Pidto, John Buccigross, Barry Melrose and various analysts
- Country of origin: United States

Production
- Running time: 30 minutes

Original release
- Network: ESPN2
- Release: 1995 – May 22, 2004

Related
- The Point

NHL 2Night is a former news magazine that used to broadcast highlights of National Hockey League games and stories about the league up to five nights a week on ESPN and ESPN2. It was usually broadcast live at 10:00 PM ET or immediately following a game on ESPN2. It was then re-broadcast a few times throughout the night and the following day (with updated scores for games that were still in progress during the live broadcast).

It debuted in 1995. The show was originally hosted by Bill Pidto and later John Buccigross. Barry Melrose was the main analyst.

== Cancellation ==
The NHL and ESPN extended their broadcast agreement for the 2004–05 season, with options for the two following seasons. From a high of 129 game telecasts on ESPN, ESPN2, and ABC in 1999–2000, the new deal called for 40 games, only 15 during the regular season, on ESPN2. As part of this reduced commitment, the network cancelled NHL2Night.

ESPNEWS provided expanded segments for Barry Melrose, usually on Thursday nights, to analyze NHL action.

After the NHL returned to ESPN in 2021, the network would announce a new hockey studio show The Point, the successor to NHL 2Night.

== Personalities ==
- Chris Berman: Fill-in host
- John Buccigross: Lead host (1998–2004)
- Bill Clement: Analyst
- Brian Engblom: Analyst
- Ray Ferraro: Playoffs analyst (1999–2002); Lead analyst (2002–2004)
- E.J. Hradek: Insider
- Michael Kim: Fill-in host
- Bob McKenzie: Insider ("North of the Border" segment)
- Barry Melrose: Lead Analyst
- Eddie Olczyk: Analyst
- Dave Revsine: Fill-in host
- Darren Pang: Analyst
- Bill Pidto: Lead host (1995–1998)
- John Saunders: Fill-in host
- Kevin Corke: Fill-in host

== Segments ==
- Faceoff—The beginning segment of the show where the day's top news is discussed
- Take Your Pick—A segment where the host and analyst(s) pick who will win a certain game or series
- Eh or Neh—A segment where the host brings up a topic. The analyst must say if it will happen (eh) or won't happen (neh)
- 2Night's Question—A trivia question asked at the first commercial break, usually relating to something that happened that day. The answer was revealed later in the show.
- Highlights-Usually the bread and butter of any sports show, this one focused on the results of any given NHL game.
