= The Point (2021 TV series) =

ESPN's main studio show for its coverage of the National Hockey League

- Genre: NHL
- Presented by: John Buccigross
- Theme music composer: Bob Christianson
- Country of origin: United States
- Original language: English

Production
- Production location: Bristol, CT studios (most segments)
- Camera setup: Multi-camera
- Running time: 1 hour
- Production company: ESPN

Original release
- Network: ESPN2; ESPN+; ESPN (Note: Special broadcasts only); ABC (Note: Special broadcasts only)
- Release: October 7, 2021 – present

Related
- NHL on ESPN; NHL on ABC; NHL 2Night

The Point is an American National Hockey League (NHL) studio show, currently airing on Tuesdays and Thursdays at 5:00 p.m. ET on ESPN2, with special editions on ESPN, ABC and ESPN+. the program is one of the few NHL-related studio programs to air during the week along with In the Crease and The Drop.

The Point is also used as a pregame show prior to NHL games on all ESPN platforms.

== Background ==
As a part of ESPN's deal with the NHL in 2021, the network would be able to air a weekly studio show that would primarily focus on NHL news and highlights which would air on ESPN2 and would be simulcasted on ESPN+. On September 30, 2021, ESPN would reveal the name of the studio show as The Point which would first air on October 7 on ESPN2.

== History ==
The Point premiered on October 7, 2021 at 5 p.m. ET on ESPN2 from Studio F in Bristol, Connecticut. As part of ESPN’s NHL Opening Week programming, the show was presented daily on ESPN from October 12–15. It then resumed in a weekly format and moved back to ESPN2. The Point would also serve as ESPN’s de facto pregame show for games aired on ESPN and ABC.

For the 2021-22 season, The Point would air on site for the first games on ESPN since 2004, which featured the Pittsburgh Penguins against the Tampa Bay Lightning and the Vegas Golden Knights against the Seattle Kraken. The Point would also air on site for the 2022 NHL All Star Game and the 2022 Stanley Cup Finals.

During the 2022 Trade Deadline, The Point would air a special covering the moves made during the deadline. During the 2022 Stanley Cup playoffs, The Point would air daily on ESPN and ESPN2. During the off-season, The Point would air a special edition show which would focus on free agency, and another one which focused on the 2022 NHL entry draft. For the 2022-23 season, The Point would move to the 6:00-7:00 p.m. slot. Also ESPN announced that The Point and its other NHL studio shows would move to ESPN Headquarters which is also the set for NFL Live.

Like the previous year, The Point aired every day during the 2023 Stanley Cup playoffs. It also aired on site for the 2023 NHL All Star Game and the 2023 NHL Stadium Series.

== Segments ==
- Top 6: The 6 best plays of the day, week, month, or year in hockey.
- Captain's Corner: Where studio analyst Mark Messier talks about the best storylines going on in the NHL.
- Parm Time: Where studio host John Buccigross reads chicken parm tweets and his fellow analysts eat Chicken parmesan.
- Highlights: Usually the bread and butter of any sports show, this one focuses on the results of every NHL game.

== Personalities ==
=== Current ===
==== Hosts ====
1. John Buccigross (2021–present)
2. Steve Levy (2021–present)
3. Arda Ocal (2021–present)

==== Contributors ====
1. Ryan Callahan (2021–present)
2. Mark Messier (2021–present)
3. Kevin Weekes (2021–present)
4. A. J. Mleczko (2021–present)
5. Emily Kaplan (2021–present)
6. Greg Wyshynski (2021–present)
7. Ray Ferraro (2021–present)
8. Leah Hextall (2021–present)
9. Blake Bolden (2022–present)
10. Dave Jackson (2021–present)
11. P. K. Subban (2022–present)

=== Former ===
- John Tortorella (2021–2022)
- Chris Chelios (2021–2023)
- Brian Boucher (2021–2023)
- Barry Melrose (2021–2023)
- Rick DiPietro (2021–2023)
- Hilary Knight (2022–2023)
- Dominic Moore (2021–2023)
- Jeremy Schaap (2021–2023)
