= Sports News Network =

American sports news cable channel

Sports News Network Mizlou Sports News Network
- Type: Cable channel
- Availability: Defunct
- Parent: Mizlou Communications Co.
- Established: 1989; 37 years ago
- Launch date: November 1989; 36 years ago
- Dissolved: December 17, 1990; 35 years ago
- Callsigns: SNN

Sports News Network (SNN) (sometimes referred to as Mizlou Sports News Network) was the first 24-hour sports news cable channel, owned by Mizlou Communications. It pre-dates NewSport, launched in 1993 & owned by Rainbow Programming Holdings, a joint venture between the Rainbow Media subsidiary of Cablevision, NBC and Liberty Media, which itself pre-dates the launch of the originally similar ESPNews in 1996.

== History ==
In August 1989, Mizlou Communications announced the November launch of Sports News Network, a 24-hour sports news and interview basic channel. SNN moved from Washington, D. C. studios to Edison, N.J. on October 1, 1990. Mizlou in February 1990 made a private placement of securities to keep SNN going. Mizlou made another attempt before July 1990 and attempted a third placement of $15–$20 million in July 1990 for the network. SNN goes dark on December 17, 1990 as parent Mizlou Communications filed for bankruptcy. Mizlou was in talks with Landmark Communications and Telecable Corporation as a potential buyer of the channel. In January 1991, Landmark dropped plans for a sport news channel and its discussions with Mizlou for the purchases of Sports News Network due to Tele-Communications Inc.'s planned launch of Prime Sports News, an all sports news cable channel.
