= ESPNews =

American pay television network

- Country: United States
- Broadcast area: Nationwide
- Headquarters: ESPN Plaza, 935 Middle Street, Bristol, Connecticut

Programming
- Language: English
- Picture format: 720p (HDTV); Downgraded to letterboxed 480i for SDTV feed

Ownership
- Owner: The Walt Disney Company (72%; via ABC Inc.); Hearst Communications (18%); National Football League (10%)
- Parent: ESPN
- Sister channels: List: ABC; ESPN; ESPN DTC; ESPN+; ESPN2; ESPNU; ESPN Deportes; ACC Network; SEC Network; NFL Network; NFL RedZone; Disney Channel; Disney Jr.; Disney XD; A&E; Lifetime; LMN; Localish; Freeform; FX; FYI; History; Nat Geo TV; Nat Geo Wild; Vice TV

History
- Launched: November 1, 1996; 30 years ago

Availability

Streaming media
- WatchESPN or ESPN app: WatchESPN.com (U.S. cable subscribers only, requires login from pay television provider to access content)
- Sling TV, YouTube TV, Hulu + Live TV, DirecTV Stream

ESPNews (pronounced "ESPN News," stylized ESPNEWS) is an American multinational digital cable and satellite television network owned by ESPN, a joint venture between the Walt Disney Company (which owns a controlling 72% stake via indirect subsidiary ABC Inc.), Hearst Communications (which owns 18%) and the National Football League (which owns 10%).

Known as "ESPN3" in its planning stages and proposed as early as 1993, the channel launched on November 1, 1996, and originally featured a rolling news format with 24-hour coverage of sports news and highlights. Since 2010, the network has largely shifted away from this format, and now primarily carries television simulcasts of ESPN Radio shows, encores of ESPN's weekday lineup of studio programs, and overflow event programming in the event of conflicts with ABC or the other ESPN networks.

As of November 2023, ESPNEWS is available to approximately 36 million pay television households in the United States—down from its 2013 peak of 76 million households.

== Format and programming ==
ESPNews is typically offered on the digital tiers of U.S. cable providers, and is carried as a premium channel in some areas, satellite providers offer it on their standard package. Some regional sports networks that are not associated with Fox Sports Networks had previously aired ESPNews during the overnight or morning hours to provide a pseudo-national sportscast to their viewers, and to fill time that would otherwise be taken up by paid programming or other lower-profile programs, though as vertical integration has occurred with the sports networks now owned by Comcast (with NBC Sports) and Charter Communications, ESPNews programming has been dropped from these networks; however, its programming is still carried during the overnight hours on MASN2. If a national ESPN broadcast is blacked out in a particular market, the ESPN broadcast will usually be replaced by ESPNews.

The network was formerly simulcast on ESPN during coverage of major breaking sports news before that network expanded SportsCenter into additional daytime slots in 2008, additionally, ABC's early morning newscast, America This Morning, previously ran a highlights segment rundown featuring sports news headlines and highlights of the previous night's sporting events presented by an ESPNews overnight anchor.

The channel's BottomLine ticker was formerly more in-depth than the versions used by ESPN's other networks. It contained not only scores, but also statistics and brief news alerts about the day's sports headlines. However, in June 2010, the network switched to the standard BottomLine and screen presentation used by all other ESPN networks in preparation for the launch of SportsCenter broadcasts.

On November 11, 2006, the channel marked its 10-year anniversary, programming commemorating the occasion included a montage of highlights covering the past 10 years in sports. The network began airing SportsCenter on nights when sporting event telecasts on ESPN and ESPN2, such as college football or Major League Baseball games, were scheduled to overrun into the program's regular timeslots on ESPN and ESPN2's own sports analysis programs, which until 2010 would be the only incidences in which SportsCenter would be carried over to ESPNews.

XM Satellite Radio and Sirius Satellite Radio both provide channels with audio simulcasts of ESPNEWS, with the network's television advertisements replaced with radio ads from each service. On February 4, 2008, XM rebranded its channel as "ESPN Xtra," and added radio programs from local ESPN Radio affiliates as well as the audio simulcast of ESPNEWS.

In August 2010, telecasts of SportsCenter on ESPNews increased in frequency, now airing whenever ESPN or ESPN2 were unable to air the program due to scheduling conflicts, along with an afternoon expansion of SportsCenter to the channel's afternoon schedule rather than rolling ESPNews-branded coverage, while ESPN and ESPN2 carry sports talk and debate programming. The Beat (a show showing pop culture and sports action to the tune of a beat) was shown while SportsCenter aired on ESPN at 6:00 p.m. Eastern Time until its cancellation in July 2011, and replacement by a rebroadcast of the ESPN2 sports talk program SportsNation. By early 2013, the only other programs featured on ESPNews were Highlight Express (a half-hour program showing the previous day's sports highlights, running from 10:00 p.m. to 3:00 p.m. Eastern Time in the afternoon), and the overnight soccer program ESPNFC Press Pass. The network also airs programming under the College Football Live banner on Saturday afternoons during college football season, a whip-around program similar to ESPN Goal Line, which gives live look-ins to multiple college football games happening simultaneously.

On June 13, 2013, Highlight Express was canceled due to low ratings and company-wide downsizing, leaving the overnight ESPNFC Press Pass, produced primarily for ESPN International, as the only program on the network that was exclusively broadcast (within the U.S.) on ESPNews, that program was removed from the schedule in August 2013, after it was supplanted by a new ESPN2 program simply titled ESPN FC. Additional runs of SportsCenter and other same-day airings of ESPN sports debate programming or the newsmagazine E:60 now fill the network's schedule, along with encores such as Friday Night Fights, as well as programming affected by sports-induced pre-emptions and overruns such as Olbermann during the US Open. The highlights and segment package for America This Morning came under the purview of the late-night SportsCenter team from Los Angeles from that day forward.

On November 29, 2017, as part of an expected announcement of 150 behind the scenes staffs being laid off from the network, ESPN announced that the primetime SportsCenter editions carried in primetime on ESPNews would be terminated after November 30, 2017 to cut costs (breaking sports news coverage will be maintained when needed). They were replaced by a block of reruns of ESPN and ESPN2's daytime talk programs, including Around the Horn, Highly Questionable, Outside the Lines, Pardon the Interruption, and SportsNation.

In March 2019, ESPNews premiered Daily Wager, a new weekday studio show devoted to sports betting. In August 2019, it was announced that Daily Wager would move to ESPN2 on August 20, 2019, and that a new L-bar featuring betting lines and other statistics would be displayed on ESPNews during non-event programming, and on ESPN2 during Daily Wager. The feature was part of ESPN's partnership with Caesars Entertainment.

=== Use as an overflow feed for live coverage ===
ESPNEWS ran a simulcast of ESPN Radio's Mike and Mike in the Morning from 2004 to 2005, the program moved to ESPN2 in 2006, although it still occasionally airs on ESPNEWS when live sports events (such as tennis' French Open or Wimbledon) air on ESPN2. When ESPN2 televised the 2009 US Open tennis tournament, SportsNation aired on ESPNEWS instead from August 31, 2009 to September 11, 2009.

As ESPN Classic's carriage declined more into specialty cable tiers due to bandwidth conservation concerns and low viewership, along with no high-definition channel ever being established before its demise on December 31, 2021, ESPNEWS became the primary overflow network for situations in which ABC, ESPN and ESPN2 carry live sports coverage, with ESPNU, the ACC Network and SEC Network being limited to college sports overflow situations.

- The network aired two National Invitation Tournament college basketball games on March 25, 2013 that were originally scheduled to air on ESPN, which instead aired an NBA game telecast between the Miami Heat and the Orlando Magic (a game in which the Heat extended its winning streak to 27 games).
- Another NBA overflow of the late game of that night's ESPN doubleheader aired partially two days later on March 27, 2013 due to ESPN2 already carrying coverage of the 2013 NCAA Division I women's basketball tournament until the first game on ESPN ended, with ESPN having an extended post-game show for the first game due to the Heat's aforementioned winning streak ending at the hands of the Chicago Bulls.
- Coverage of the NCAA women's softball preliminary tournament aired on ESPNEWS on May 18, 2013, due to NBA playoff coverage on ESPN and X Games Barcelona coverage on ESPN2.
- The network's most apparent overflow use has been with the NASCAR Nationwide Series in 2013. On April 26, 2013, ESPNEWS carried full live coverage of the Toyota Care 250 at Richmond International Raceway, due to NBA playoff coverage on ESPN, with the 2013 NFL draft's second night airing on ESPN2. The Kentucky 300 on September 21, 2013 from Kentucky Speedway was also moved over to ESPNEWS due to college football games airing on both ESPN networks.
- On August 31, 2013, ESPNEWS aired three college football games, including the Kentucky–Western Kentucky game live from LP Field in Nashville, presumably due to all other ESPN networks being fully booked for college games at that time. ESPN Goal Line also has been expanded onto additional cable systems through new carriage agreements struck by the Walt Disney Company in early 2013, making the Goal Line simulcast unneeded.
- ESPN's coverage of Wimbledon was often moved to ESPNews in 2014 due to their coverage of the 2014 FIFA World Cup.
- ESPN's coverage of the Wisconsin v. USC Holiday Bowl was moved to ESPNews in 2015.
- ESPN's coverage of the northeast regional NCAA hockey tournament, due to the NCAA Women's basketball tournament on ESPN, NCAA baseball and softball on ESPN2 and NCAA lacrosse and other regional games of the NCAA hockey tournament on ESPN-U in 2018.
- Also due to live coverage on ESPN and ESPN2 of the NCAA Women's basketball tournament, ESPNews showed the rest of the day's Miami Open quarterfinal and semifinal coverage that was shown on ESPN2 before primetime coverage of the basketball tournament.
- Olbermann was also carried live on ESPNEWS on weeknights if sports coverage on ESPN2 overflowed into that program's regular time slot.
- The network aired game 6 in the first round of the 2018 NBA playoffs on April 27, 2018 between the Toronto Raptors and the Washington Wizards due to ESPN airing coverage of the 2018 NFL draft (which would later shift to ESPN2) and later airing another first-round game between the Indiana Pacers and Cleveland Cavaliers. Additionally, this game was also simulcast on NBA TV using the ESPN feed.
- In June 2018, it was announced that six National Women's Soccer League matches through the end of the 2018 season would air on ESPNews, as part of its broadcast arrangement with fellow Disney/Hearst venture A&E Networks and Lifetime.
- Game 3 of the semifinal round of the 2018 WNBA Playoffs between the Atlanta Dream and Washington Mystics aired on ESPNEWS due to a college football game (Western Kentucky–Wisconsin) on ESPN and the third round of the US Open airing on ESPN2. As with the Raptors–Wizards playoff game mentioned earlier, this game was also simulcast on NBA TV using the ESPNews feed including the BottomLine ticker which was displayed above their own ticker.

Additionally, ESPNEWS simulcasted ESPN Deportes' coverage of the 2018 Supercopa de España, the first time it has aired Spanish-language programming although the BottomLine ticker continued to be displayed in English.

== List of programs broadcast by ESPNews ==
=== Current ===
- NBA Today (October 2021 – present)
- Pardon the Interruption (2003–present)
- SportsCenter (2008–present)

=== Former ===
- 4 Qtrs (2003–2006)
- Around the Horn (2003–2025)
- The Beat (2009–2010)
- Coaches' Corner (aired on Tuesday from 2001–2005)
- Daily Wager (2019–present)
- The Dan Le Batard Show with Stugotz (2018–2020)
- ESPNEWS (1996–2011)
- ESPNEWS Late Night (2003–2010)
- ESPNEWS Morning Final (2003–2010)
- ESPNEWS Early Evening (2003–2006)
- ESPNEWS Day (2006–2009)
- ESPNEWS Gametime (2006–2009)
- ESPNEWS Night Cap (2005–2006)
- ESPNEWS Postgame (2006–2009)
- ESPNEWS Pregame (2006–2009)
- ESPN Radio Primetime (2007–2008)
- Football Friday (2004–2009)
- The Highlight Zone (2008–2009)
- Highlight Express (2010–2013)
- The Hot List (2003–2009)
- Mike and Mike in the Morning (2004–2006, simulcast of ESPN Radio show, moved to ESPN2 in 2006, still aired on ESPNEWS when ESPN2 was scheduled to air live sports events, the ESPN2 simulcast is rebroadcast mornings beginning at 10:00 a.m. Eastern)
- NFL Monday Quarterback (aired on Mondays from 2001–2005)
- The Pulse (2004–2009)
- The Ryen Russillo Show (??–2017)
- The Stephen A. Smith Show (2017 – January 2020)
- The Will Cain Show (2018–June 2020)
- Golic and Wingo (2018–2020)
- First Take, Your Take with Jason Fitz (2020)
- Greeny (August 2020 – November 2020)
- The Max Kellerman Show (August 2020 – November 2020)
- Chiney and Golic Jr. (August 2020 – November 2020)

== ESPN Radio segment ==
In 2007, ESPNEWS began broadcasting a half-hour segment of ESPN Radio programming on Sunday mornings. The broadcast includes three commentators (a retired coach, a retired player, and an analyst) to break down the events of the featured sport, while an on-screen graphical list of standings, statistical leaders, and other statistics of the featured sport is displayed, the upper-right of the screen shows sports highlights (usually of the player or team of discussion), a fan comment board appears at the bottom of the screen, above the ESPNEWS BottomLine.

== High definition ==

ESPNEWS operates a high-definition simulcast feed, which broadcasts in 720p (the default resolution format for the Walt Disney Company's television properties) and was launched on March 30, 2008. Originally, the layout and graphics were reworked specifically for viewing on widescreen television sets, offering additional content not available on the channel's standard-definition feed. It utilized reworked HD sideline graphics, a descendant of the "Rundown" used on overnight editions of SportsCenter on ESPN, which wrapped around the top left and bottom of the widescreen picture. The HD Sideline offered the display of textual information, headshots, news and scores, while still delivering video highlights in the HD format.

The enhanced format was discontinued in June 2010 and the channel now broadcasts in near-fullscreen 16:9, with regular gray-and-red graphics similar to those used by the other ESPN channels. The move was made to "accommodate the high number of SportsCenters that moved to the network during the World Cup."

On May 20, 2012, ESPNEWS switched the presentation of its standard definition feed from 4:3 to a downscaled widescreen letterbox version of the HD feed, becoming the last ESPN network with a HD companion channel to make the conversion to a full-widescreen presentation. ESPNEWS HD was added to Dish Network on March 18, 2014, as part of a new carriage agreement that ended a four-year dispute that removed existing HD simulcast feeds of Disney-owned channels.

== International versions ==
While not operating under the ESPN name, CTV Specialty Television (which is partly owned by ESPN) operates RDS Info, a French-language sister network to Réseau des sports (RDS) (which in turn, is a sister network to the English language TSN), which maintains a sports news format and ticker similar to that used by ESPNews, and carries continuous broadcasts of Sports 30 (RDS's equivalent of SportsCenter). Until October 2011, when RDS2 was launched, RDS Info was also used as a part-time secondary outlet for RDS in the event of scheduling conflicts. It has since served as an occasional tertiary outlet for RDS programming, similar to the role now served by ESPNews.

ESPN Star Sports (a joint venture between ESPN International and Star TV) operated an Asian version of ESPNews that was launched in November 2009 in Singapore on Singtel's Mio TV and later expanded to other areas, including Hong Kong, where it was launched in August 2011 on PCCW's Now TV. It was renamed Fox Sports News in 2013, following News Corporation's full take over of ESPN Star Sports, before it was closed down in 2017.

== Personalities ==
This is a list of several past and present personalities on the ESPNews network. (NOTE: All of the current ESPNews anchors listed below are now SportsCenter anchors as of June 2013.)

=== Current ===
- Max Bretos: 2010–present (anchor, ESPNews)
- Kevin Connors: 2008–present (anchor, ESPNews)

=== Former ===
- David Amber: 2003–2005 (anchor, ESPNews), now with the NHL Network
- Andre Aldridge: 1997–2000 (anchor, ESPNews), now with NBA TV
- John Anderson: 1999–2000 (anchor, ESPNews), now a SportsCenter anchor for ESPN
- Steve Berthiaume: 1999–2005, 2007–2012 (anchor, ESPNews), now an Arizona Diamondbacks play-by-play commentator with Bally Sports Arizona
- Michelle Bonner: 2005–2012 (anchor, ESPNews)
- Cindy Brunson: 1999–2012 (anchor, ESPNews), now with Bally Sports Arizona
- Steve Bunin: 2003–2012 (anchor, ESPNews), was in same position at Comcast SportsNet Houston (now Space City Home Network) until October 2014, now with Yahoo! Sports
- Ryan Burr: 2006–2011 (anchor, ESPNews), now with the Golf Channel
- Cara Capuano: 2000–2004 (anchor, ESPNews), now in same position at ESPNU
- Jonathan Coachman: 2008–2017 (anchor ESPNews), now WWE Pre show host
- Linda Cohn: 1996–present (anchor, ESPNews)
- Lindsay Czarniak 2011–2017 (anchor, ESPNews), was later a SportsCenter anchor for ESPN let go on August 31, 2017
- Neil Everett: 2001–2005 (anchor, ESPNews), now a Los Angeles-based SportsCenter anchor for ESPN
- Dave Feldman: 1996–2000 (afternoon anchor, ESPNews), now a SportsNet Central anchor for NBC Sports Bay Area
- Mike Golic: 2004–2005 (co-host, Mike & Mike)
- Mike Greenberg: 1996–2005 (co-host, Mike & Mike and anchor, ESPNews)
- Mike Hall: 2004–2005 (anchor, ESPNews), formerly with ESPNU from 2005-03-04 to 2007-04-27, now with BTN
- Mike Hill: 2005–2013 (anchor, ESPNews), now with Fox Sports 1
- Bob Halloran: 1999–2003 (anchor, ESPNews), now at WCVB-TV in Boston
- David Holmes: 2005–2006 (anchor, ESPNews), now a sports reporter and substitute sports anchor at WTVG (ABC) in Toledo, OH
- Jason Jackson: 1996–2002 (anchor, ESPNews), now a broadcaster for the Miami Heat
- Dana Jacobson: 2002–2005 (anchor, ESPNews), now co-host of TBD in the AM on CBS Sports Radio; also co-anchor on CBS This Morning Saturday; now with CBS News and Sports
- Brian Kenny: 2003–2005 (anchor, ESPNews, The Hot List), now with MLB Network
- Michael Kim: 1996–2013 (anchor, ESPNews), now with 120 Sports
- David Lloyd: 1997–present (anchor, ESPNews)
- Mark Malone: 1996–2004 (anchor, ESPNews), now sports director for WBBM-TV (CBS) in Chicago, IL
- Jade McCarthy: 2012–2013 (anchor, ESPNews), was later a SportsCenter anchor, let go by ESPN on April 26, 2017
- Dari Nowkhah: 2004–2011 (anchor, ESPNews), now in same position at ESPNU
- Bill Pidto: 1996–2008 (anchor, ESPNEWS), now with MSG Network
- Dave Revsine: 1996–2007 (anchor, ESPNews), now lead anchor at BTN
- Scott Reiss: 2001–2008 (anchor, ESPNews), now with NBC Sports Bay Area
- Danyelle Sargent: 2003–2006 (anchor, ESPNews), now in same position at NFL Network
- Will Selva: 2007–?(anchor, ESPNews), now at NFL Network
- Bill Seward: 1996–2000 (anchor, ESPNews), now a sports anchor at NBC Sports, CBS Radio and PBP announcer of Rugby World Cup on NBC
- Anish Shroff: 2008–2012 (anchor, ESPNews), now an anchor and a play-by-play commentator at ESPNU
- Jaymee Sire: 2013–2017 (anchor, ESPNews), was later a SportsCenter anchor, let go by ESPN on April 26, 2017
- Mike Tirico: 1996–? (anchor, ESPNews), now a host and play-by-play commentator for NBC Sports; was an original anchor on ESPNews when it was launched on 1996-11-01
- Stan Verrett: 2002–2009 (anchor, ESPNews), now a Los Angeles-based SportsCenter anchor for ESPN
- Sara Walsh: 2010–2017 (anchor, ESPNews), was later a SportsCenter anchor, let go by ESPN on May 4, 2017
- Pam Ward: 1996–2004 (anchor, ESPNews), now a play-by-play commentator for ESPN
- Whit Watson: 1997–2002 (anchor, ESPNews), now with the Golf Channel
- Bram Weinstein: 2008–2010 (anchor, ESPNews), was later a SportsCenter anchor, left ESPN in 2015
- Matt Winer: 2001–2009 (anchor, ESPNews), now with Turner Sports and NBA TV
- Mike Yam: 2008–2012 (anchor, ESPNews)
- Adnan Virk: 2010–2019 (anchor, ESPNews)

== See also ==
- SportsCenter
