= Brian Kenny (sportscaster) =

American sportscaster (born 1963)

Brian Kenny at MLB Network

Brian Kenny (born October 18, 1963) is a studio host for MLB Network and winner of the Henry Chadwick Award from the Society for American Baseball Research. The television face of Sabermetrics and baseball analytics, he is the host of the weekday program MLB Now, known as “the show for the thinking fan". He previously worked for ESPN, where he won three Emmys, and had his own show on ESPN Radio named The Brian Kenny Show. He is also the host of the Baseball Hall of Fame Induction Ceremonies in Cooperstown, New York. Formerly a boxing play-by-play announcer for Fox Sports and DAZN.

== Broadcasting career ==
Kenny graduated Magna Cum Laude at the New York Institute of Technology in Old Westbury, New York in 1985. He also attended St. John's University from 1981 to 1982. In college, Kenny began his broadcasting career as a reporter for "LI News Tonight," New York Tech’s long-time daily news program. In May 1985, he joined WLIG TV 55 Long Island as a reporter. He was named the station’s Sports Director in September in 1985, beginning his sportscasting career. In August 1986, Kenny was named Sports Director at WTZA-TV (later WRNN-TV) in Kingston, New York. He hosted a late-evening talk show “Sports Line Live,” and called play-by-play for Marist Red Foxes men's basketball and Hudson Valley Renegades minor league baseball. He would remain at the station until 1997, winning 11 New York State Broadcasters Awards and six Associated Press Awards for his coverage of local sports.

=== ESPN ===
After joining ESPN in 1997, Kenny anchored the 6:00 pm SportsCenter, and was the host of Friday Night Fights on ESPN2. On Friday Night Fights, he was known for his heated debates with some of the best boxers in the world, particularly Floyd Mayweather. He also hosted Baseball Tonight,The Hot List on ESPNEWS, plus "Classic Ringside" and The Top 5 Reasons You Can't Blame... on ESPN Classic.

In 2005, he hosted a special series called Ringside. It runs three to six hours long an episode and featured on each episode one great boxer.

Kenny appears as himself in the 2006 film Rocky Balboa and in the 2007 film Resurrecting the Champ, and also served with fellow ESPN personality John Saunders as the "announcing team" for a home demolition during an episode of Extreme Makeover: Home Edition that aired on November 2, 2008. (The episode involved a project in which the Extreme Makeover team built a new home and gym for a family that operated a youth boxing gym in Geneva, New York).

Prior to hosting The Brian Kenny Show on ESPN Radio, he co-hosted Kellerman and Kenny with Max Kellerman on ESPN Radio in New York City.

=== MLB Network ===
Kenny announced on the August 31, 2011 edition of The Brian Kenny Show that he was leaving ESPN to become an anchor with MLB Network. His final show was on September 2, 2011, with the 6:00 p.m. edition of SportsCenter alongside Jonathan Coachman. Kenny made his debut on MLB Tonight on September 19, 2011.

Since 2013, Kenny has been the host of MLB Now on MLB Network. Kenny also appears on MLB Network's flagship program "MLB Tonight", the offseason countdown series "Top 10 Right Now!," and on-site coverage of the All-Star Game and World Series.

Since 2017, Kenny has served as the Master of Ceremonies for the Baseball Hall of Fame Induction.

His first book, Ahead of the Curve: Inside the Baseball Revolution, was published in 2016 by Simon and Schuster and won the National SABR Research Award in 2017.

== Other work and appearances ==
A leading baseball historian, he is the author of the award winning book “Ahead of the Curve: Inside the Baseball Revolution”, published by Simon and Schuster, in 2016. Kenny won the 2017 SABR Research Award for his work on the book. Additionally, Kenny is the emcee of the National Baseball Hall of Fame Induction Ceremony held each year in Cooperstown, New York.

Kenny’s association with boxing began with his training at the Cus D’Amato Catskill Boxing Club in the 1980’s, training alongside the then-future Heavyweight Champion Mike Tyson. Kenny has gone on to call and host fights for ESPN’s Friday Night Fights, The Contender, Showtime Championship Boxing, Fox Sports, Top Rank, DAZN, and even returning to his former network to call occasional bouts for ESPN. His combative interviews with Floyd Mayweather are considered classics of interviewing process, racking up huge views to this day on YouTube. He won the Sam Taub Award for broadcasting excellence in 2005, awarded by the Boxing Writers Association of America.

Kenny appeared as himself in the movie "Rocky Balboa" (2006) and "Resurrecting the Champ" (2007), while appearing in the television shows "The Dead Zone" (2003) and "Brockmire" (2016).

== Awards ==
A 9-time National Sports Emmy Award winner and Sports Illustrated Media Personality of the Year recipient, Brian Kenny is a studio host and analyst for MLB Network. He is also the recipient of the 2005 Sam Taub Award for excellence in boxing broadcasting.

Kenny was inducted into The New York State Baseball Hall of Fame in 2023.

In July 2026, he received the prestigious Henry Chadwick Award from the Society for American Baseball Research.

== Personal life ==
Brian Kenny is married to the former Nicole Jacqueline Desy, Coco Kenny, and they have five children together.

== Works ==
- Kenny, Brian (2016). Ahead of the Curve: Inside the Baseball Revolution. Simon & Schuster. ISBN 9781501106330.
