= Dave Revsine =

American sports journalist (born 1969)

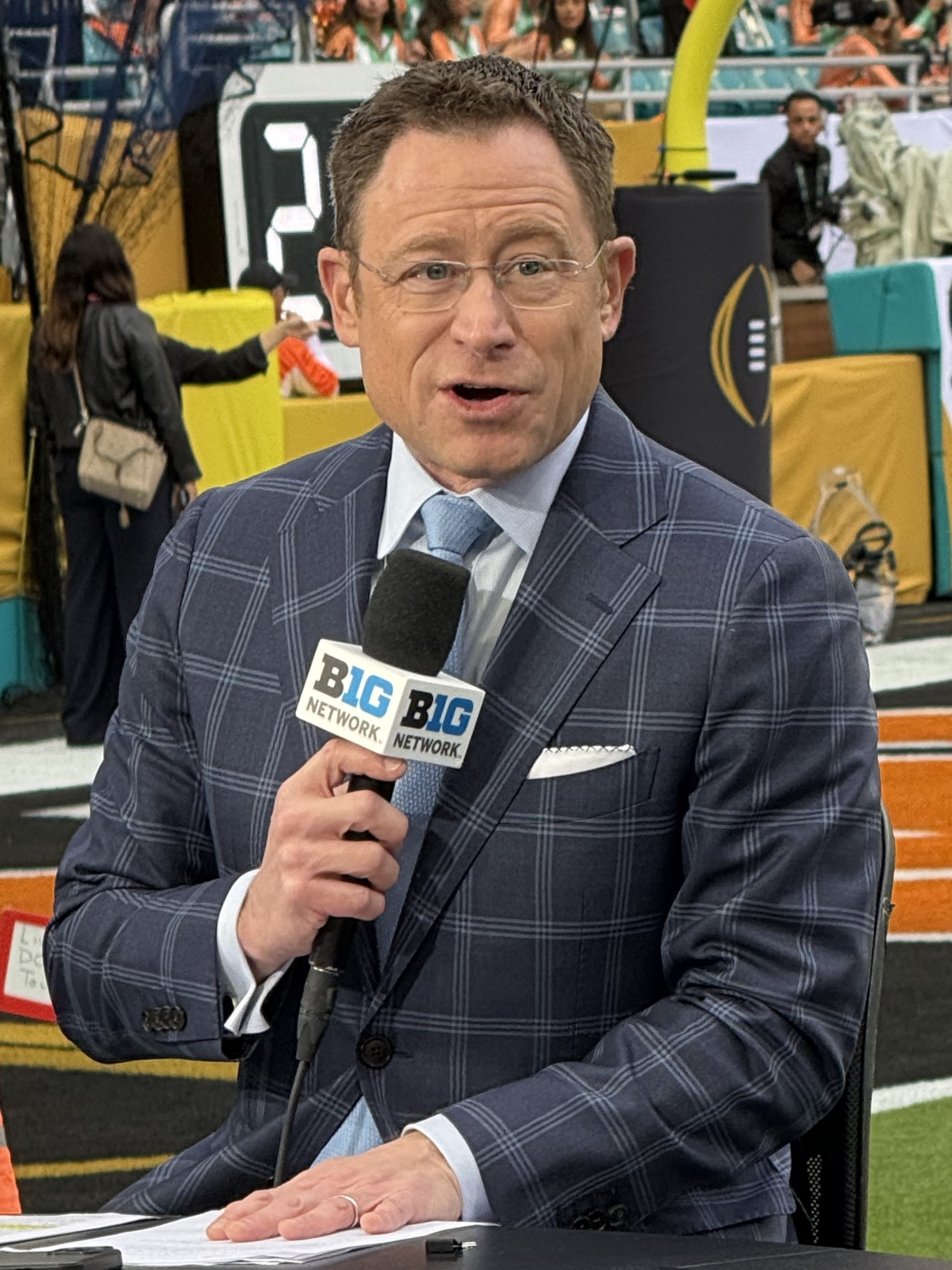
- Revsine in 2026
- Born: David Revsine; July 20, 1969 (age 56); Urbana, Illinois, U.S.
- Occupations: sportscaster, columnist, and sports journalist
- Years active: 1991-present
- Employer: Big Ten Network
- Children: 3

Dave Revsine (born July 20, 1969) is an American sportscaster, and sports columnist and journalist who currently serves as the lead studio host for the Big Ten Network. Previously, he was a journalist at ESPN anchoring on SportsCenter and ESPNEWS, along with play-by-play on select college basketball games.

== Biography ==
Revsine attended Glenbrook North High School and graduated Phi Beta Kappa from Northwestern University in 1991. While at Northwestern, Revsine was heavily involved in broadcasting and became a sportscaster on WNUR Radio. Awarded a Rotary Ambassadorial Scholarship, Revsine lived abroad for a year after college. As a Rotary Scholar he attended Trinity College, Dublin and played on the school's basketball team.

Prior to becoming a sports journalist, Revsine was an investment banker at Chase Manhattan Bank in New York City. He worked there for one year prior to landing a job on TV as a sports anchor and reporter at KXII-TV in Sherman, Texas. Shortly after, he worked in the Quad Cities for CBS affiliate WHBF-TV before being hired by ESPN in 1996.

=== ESPN ===
In his 10 years at ESPN, Revsine covered a wide range of programs including SportsCenter, College GameNight, NFL Live, NHL 2Night and Outside the Lines. He also did play-by-play for roughly 25 college basketball games each year on ESPN and ESPN2.

=== Big Ten Network ===
In May, 2007, he announced his departure from ESPN to join the Big Ten Network as their lead studio host. Revsine officially left the network in late June of that year.

His words were the first ever on the Big Ten Network:

“Eleven schools, 252 varsity teams, one great network to cover it all. Welcome to the Big Ten Network, your ultimate source for Big Ten sports, featuring the games, passion and tradition of the nation’s foremost athletic conference.” – August 30, 2007.

Currently, Revsine hosts Big Ten Tonight and Big Ten Football Saturday on the Big Ten Network as well as the NFL Mobile Gamecenter on Sprint Exclusive Entertainment. Revsine is also the author of the Numbers blog on BigTenNetwork.com and is featured on Comcast.net College Hoopla at win.comcast.net.

In 2025, Revsine was named one of the most impactful sports TV studio hosts of the 21st Century by The New York Times.

=== Author ===
In 2014, Revsine's first book, "The Opening Kickoff: The Tumultuous Birth of a Football Nation", was released. It made both The New York Times and Boston Globe Best-Seller lists.
