= Football Friday =

- Starring: Stan Verrett; Merril Hoge
- Country of origin: United States

Production
- Running time: 60 minutes

Original release
- Network: ESPNEWS
- Release: September 3, 2004 – January 2, 2009

Football Friday is an American football news and analysis television show on ESPNEWS every Friday, year-round, at 8pm ET to 9pm ET and reairs at noon ET, on Saturdays. Since debuting in 2004, the show has been hosted by Stan Verrett along with analysis from former pro fullback Merril Hoge. Originally the show just ran through the football season, but since September 1, 2006 through its final original airing on January 2, 2009, it has run on Fridays year-round.

Football Friday is a fast-paced program that covers everything from college football to the National Football League and even high school football. Throughout the show, Stan and Merril run through all the highlights, injury updates, interviews and analysis to preview the upcoming weekend in football.

== Segments ==
- "Merril's Playbook": Merril breaks down the defense and offense of teams to find out how to beat them.
- "Office Pool": Hank Goldberg joins the gang via satellite to make his picks for the upcoming NFL games.
- "Hoge Podge": Merril shares a random or off-the-wall story from the NFL.
- "Bold Prediction": At the end of each show, Merril and Sean go out on a limb and predict the score of at least one game.
