= Vegas Kickoff Classic =

Annual college football game

Modelo Vegas Kickoff Classic
- Logo for the 2021 Vegas Kickoff Classic (logo changed annually with each game)
- Stadium: Allegiant Stadium
- Location: Paradise, Nevada
- Operated: 2021–present

Sponsors
- Good Sam (2021); Modelo (2024)

2024 matchup
- USC 27, LSU 20

2027 matchup
- Miami vs Utah

The Vegas Kickoff Classic is a college football game played on the opening weekend of the college football season in Paradise at Allegiant Stadium, home of the Las Vegas Raiders and the UNLV Rebels. The 2021 game was sponsored by Good Sam and officially known as the Good Sam Vegas Kickoff Classic. The Vegas Kickoff Classic is managed by the Las Vegas Bowl.

== Game results ==
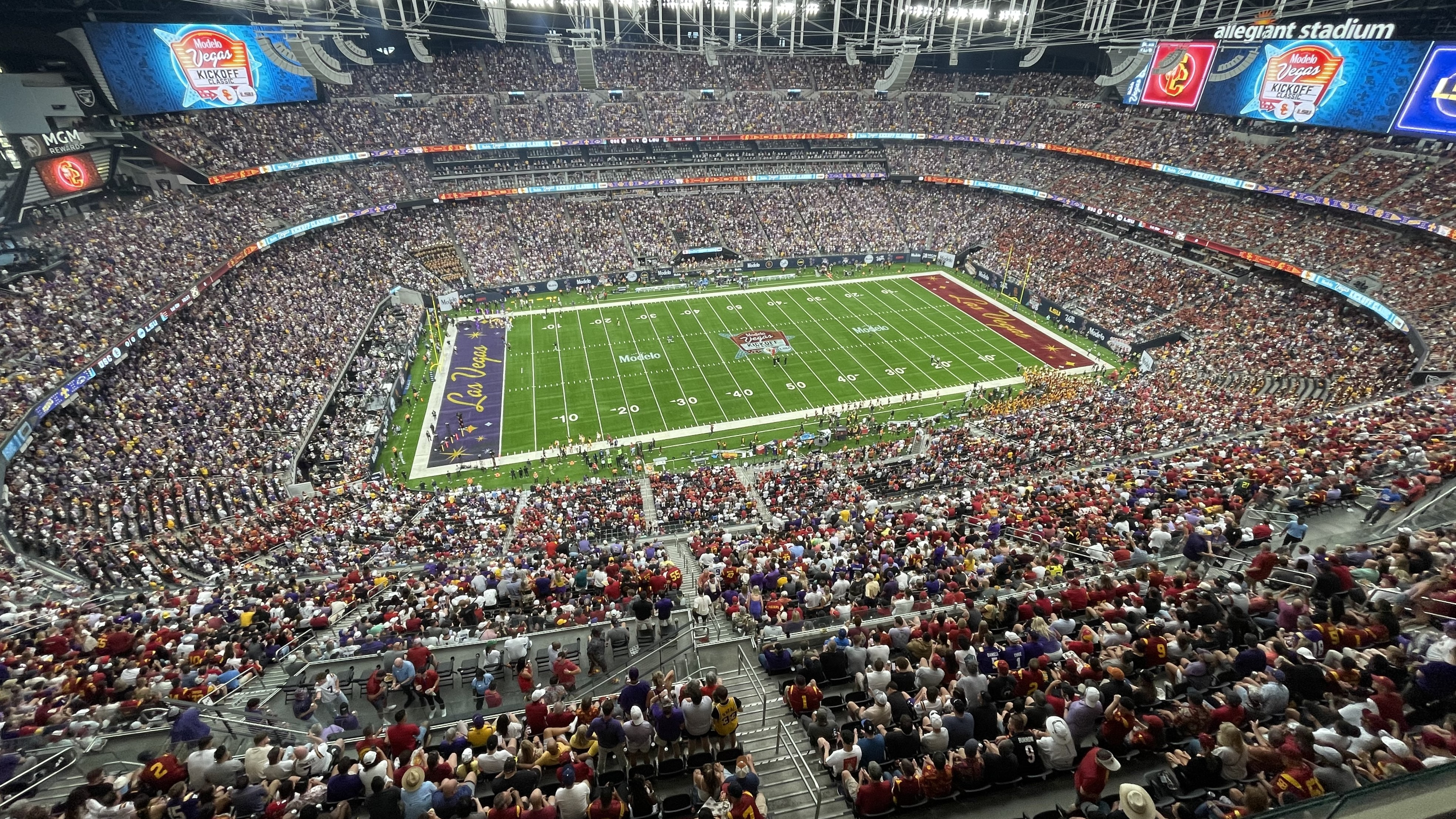
2024 Vegas Kickoff Classic.

Season	Date	Winning team		Losing team		Attendance
2021	September 4, 2021	BYU	24	Arizona	16	54,541
2024	September 1	23 USC	27	13 LSU	20	63,969

Rankings are from the AP Poll.

== Future games ==
Season	Date	Matchup		Ref
2027	September 4	Miami (FL)	Utah	
2027	TBA	North Dakota State	Montana State (FCS)	
2028	TBA	BYU	Oregon State	
2029	TBA	Montana (FCS)	South Dakota State (FCS)	
2030	TBA	Texas Tech	Arkansas	
