= Allegiant Stadium =

Multi-purpose indoor stadium in Paradise, Nevada, U.S.

- The Death Star

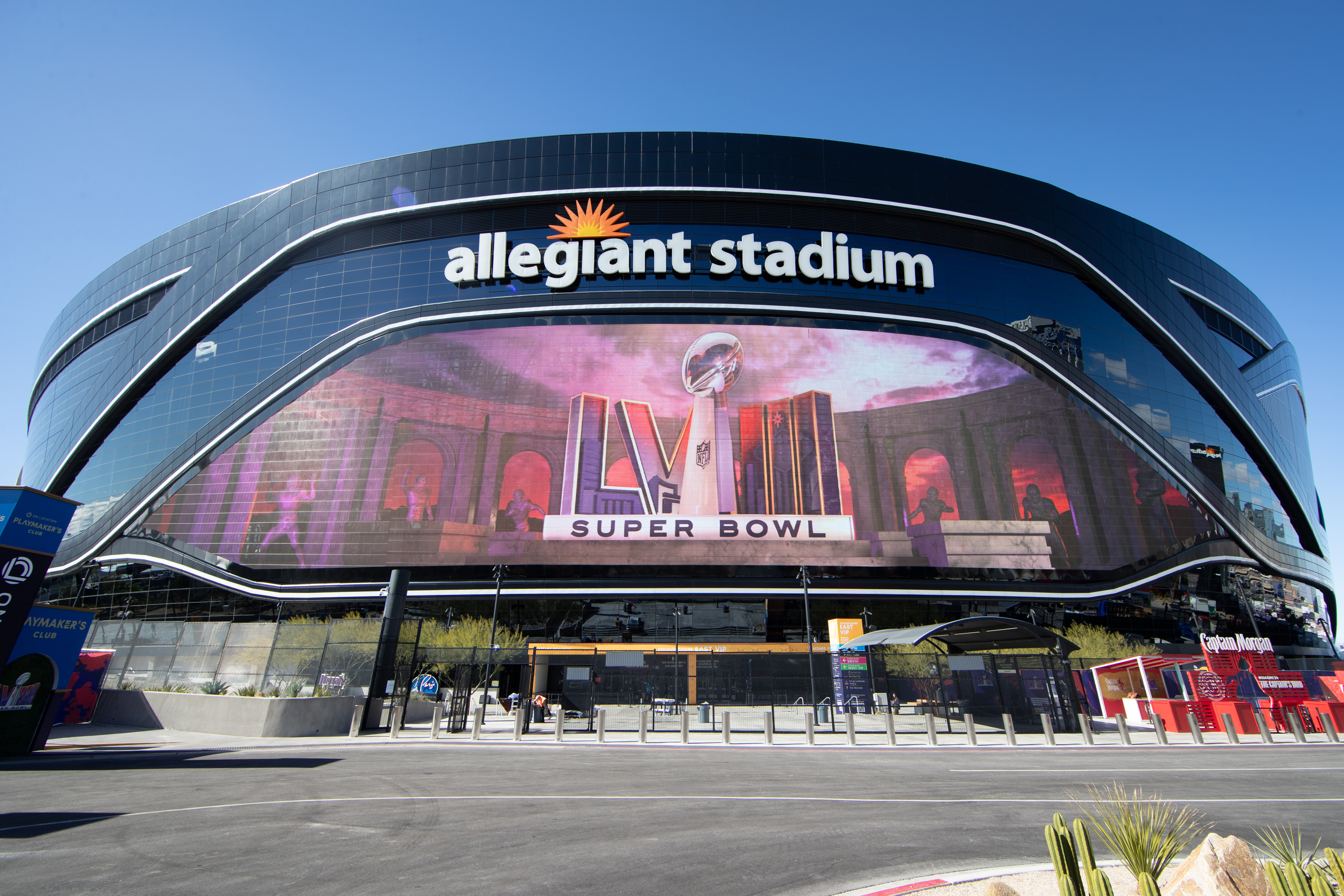
- Prior to Super Bowl LVIII in February 2024

- Location within the United States Location within Nevada
- Interactive map of Allegiant Stadium
- Full name: Allegiant Stadium
- Former names: Las Vegas Stadium (planning)
- Address: 3333 Al Davis Way
- Location: Paradise, Nevada, U.S.
- Coordinates: 36°05′26″N 115°11′2″W
- Elevation: 2,190 feet (670 m) AMSL
- Owner: Las Vegas Stadium Authority
- Operator: AEG Facilities
- Capacity: NFL: 65,000 (expandable to 71,835); Soccer: 61,000
- Executive suites: 128
- Roof: Skylight
- Surface: Bermuda grass (Raiders); Artificial turf (UNLV)
- Record attendance: Professional wrestling: 124,693 (WrestleMania 41, April 19-20, 2025); Concert: 70,921 (Luke Combs, March 21, 2026); Boxing: 70,482 (Canelo Álvarez vs. Terence Crawford; September 13, 2025); Football: 63,969 (2024 Vegas Kickoff Classic, USC vs. LSU, September 1, 2024)
- Acreage: 62 acres (0.25 km^{2})

Construction
- Groundbreaking: November 13, 2017; 9 years ago
- Opened: July 31, 2020; 6 years ago
- Cost: US$1.9 billion ($2.36 billion in 2025 dollars)
- Architects: MANICA Architecture; HNTB
- Project manager: ICON Venue Group
- Structural engineer: Arup
- Services engineers: Smith Seckman Reid, Inc.
- General contractors: Mortenson Construction; McCarthy Building Companies, Inc.

Tenants
- Las Vegas Raiders (NFL) 2020–present UNLV Rebels (NCAA) 2020–present Las Vegas Bowl (NCAA) 2021–present Vegas Kickoff Classic (NCAA) 2021–present

Website
- allegiantstadium.com

Allegiant Stadium is a multi-purpose indoor stadium in the western United States, located in Paradise, Nevada, southwest of adjacent Las Vegas. Opened six years ago in 2020, it is the home field of the Las Vegas Raiders of the National Football League (NFL) and the University of Nevada, Las Vegas (UNLV) Rebels. The stadium also hosts the Vegas Kickoff Classic in early September and the Las Vegas Bowl in December. It hosted SummerSlam in 2021, which was the first live event with fans in attendance to be held at the stadium since its opening the year prior, Super Bowl LVIII in 2024, WrestleMania 41 in 2025, WrestleMania 42 in 2026, and will host the College Football Playoff National Championship in January 2027. It is scheduled to host Super Bowl LXIII in February 2029.

Allegiant Stadium is located on about 62 acres (0.25 km^{2}) of land west of Mandalay Bay at Russell Road and Hacienda Avenue, between Polaris Avenue and Dean Martin Drive, just west of Interstate 15. At $1.9 billion, it is among the most expensive stadiums in the world. Construction of the stadium began on November 13, 2017. Allegiant Stadium is indoors with a translucent roof made of ETFE, allowing for climate control and natural sunlight. The stadium has been nicknamed the "Death Star" in reference to the Star Wars franchise.

== Design ==
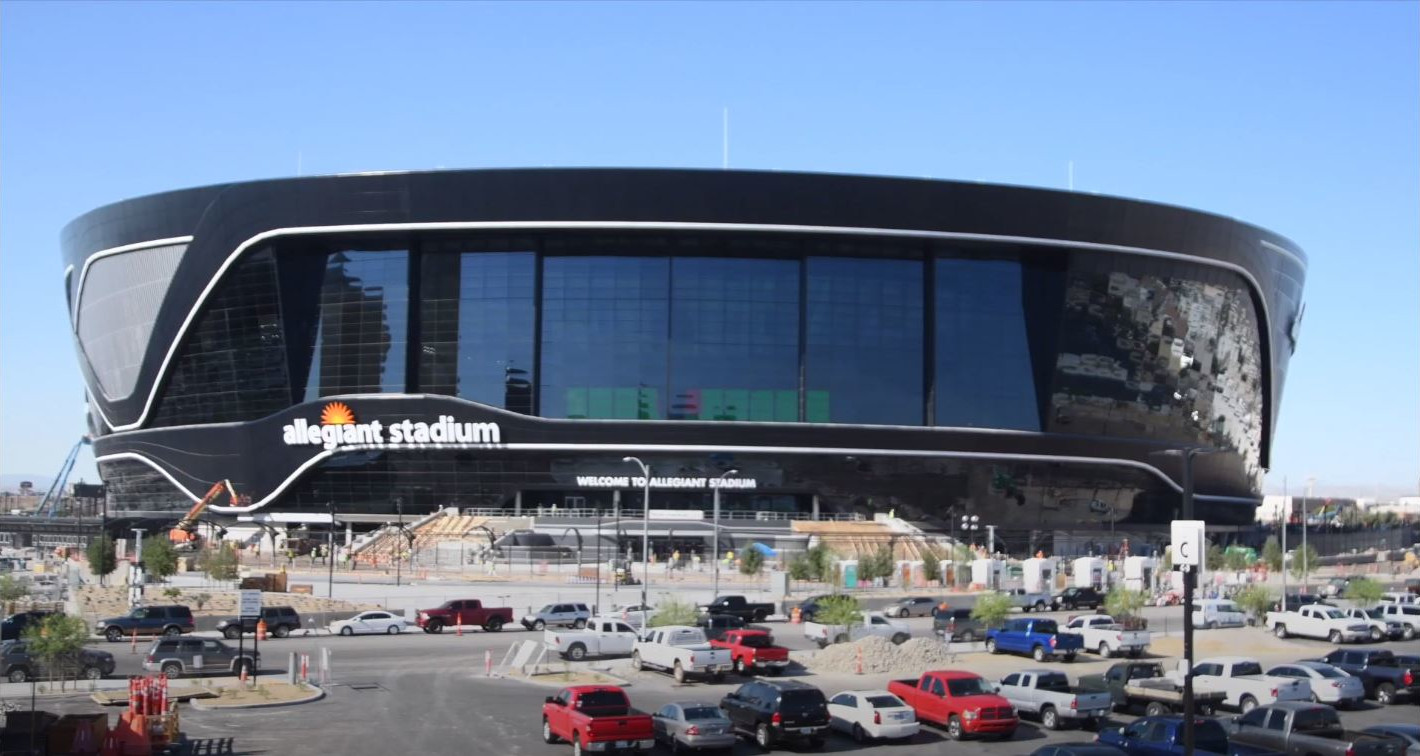
The large sliding windows facing the Las Vegas Strip.

For Allegiant Stadium, Raiders owner Mark Davis retained the same architecture firm, MANICA Architecture, that had designed the previously proposed Carson Stadium near Los Angeles. Davis retained much of the look from the Carson stadium because he "fell in love with the overall design of it".

Allegiant Stadium is a ten-level domed stadium featuring an ETFE roof, silver and black exterior with light-up strips installed by YESCO, a 275-foot (84 m) media mesh video screen facing Interstate 15, and large retractable curtain-like side windows facing the Las Vegas Strip. The north endzone area in front of the retractable windows contains the Al Davis memorial torch, a large 85-foot (26 m) torch that houses a flame in honor of Al Davis, the late longtime owner of the Raiders. In 2019, the torch was reported to be the largest 3D printed object in the world. Las Vegas-based artist Michael Godard was commissioned by the Raiders to oversee the planning and execution of the artwork displayed at the stadium.

The stadium has a roll-in natural Bermuda grass field similar to the one at State Farm Stadium in Glendale, Arizona, which is primarily used for NFL games. The main advantages of such a configuration are that it allows the natural playing surface to be exposed to natural sunlight when not in use and allows other events to be held at the facility without any risk of damage to the grass. Unlike the Arizona facility, Allegiant Stadium also has an artificial turf field, which is primarily used for college football games. This design was chosen because UNLV prefers to play on an artificial turf surface, and also due to concerns that use of the grass field by two teams would cause excessive wear to the playing surface. The artificial turf is placed directly on the stadium's concrete floor, and is rolled up and stored under the stadium when the tray is rolled in.

There are 2,700 parking spots surrounding the stadium and 6,000 in proximity to it. More than 35,000 parking spaces are located within a mile of Allegiant Stadium.

Aerial view of Allegiant Stadium, taken on July 6, 2023

== History ==
=== Planning and approval ===
In January 2016, reports emerged that Las Vegas Sands was considering developing a stadium in conjunction with Majestic Realty and UNLV, on a 42-acre (17 ha) site on Tropicana Avenue owned by UNLV. UNLV had been in the market for a new stadium to replace Sam Boyd Stadium since at least 2011.

Raiders owner Mark Davis visited Las Vegas on January 29, 2015, to tour the site and meet with Sands chairman Sheldon Adelson and other local figures. The Raiders, who had been trying to get a new stadium built for the team since the 1980s, had just missed out on relocating to Los Angeles that same month with the Rams and Chargers moving into a new stadium in Inglewood, California, and were at an impasse in Oakland. In order for the team to relocate to Las Vegas, a new stadium was required, since Sam Boyd Stadium was undersized for the NFL and there were no other professional-caliber stadiums in Nevada. The Raiders had previously played a preseason game in Las Vegas at Cashman Field against the Houston Oilers during the 1964 American Football League (AFL) preseason and owner Al Davis considered relocating the team there.

On March 21, 2016, when asked about Las Vegas, Davis said, "I think the Raiders like the Las Vegas plan," and "it's a very very very intriguing and exciting plan." Davis also met with Nevada Governor Brian Sandoval about the stadium plan. On April 1, 2016, Davis met with UNLV officials and toured Sam Boyd Stadium to evaluate whether it could serve as a temporary home for the team.

On April 28, 2016, Davis said he wanted to move the Raiders to Las Vegas and pledged $500 million toward constructing the proposed $1.4-billion domed stadium. "Together we can turn the Silver State into the silver and black state," Davis said.

In the spring of 2016, the board of directors of Las Vegas Sands rejected Adelson's stadium proposal. Adelson decided to move ahead with the stadium as an individual investment, pledging $650 million of his personal wealth to the project.

The viability of the Tropicana Avenue site was called into serious question in June 2016, when Southwest Airlines objected to the location because its proximity to the northern end of one of Harry Reid International Airport's runways could negatively affect the safety and capacity of air traffic at the airport. The list of potential locations soon expanded to nine candidates, including the sites of the Wild Wild West casino, the Wynn golf course, the Riviera casino, the Las Vegas Festival Grounds, and Cashman Center. By September, the list was narrowed to two possibilities: the Bali Hai Golf Club, south of Mandalay Bay, and a vacant lot on Russell Road, just west of Interstate 15.

On August 25, 2016, the Raiders filed a trademark application for "Las Vegas Raiders" on the same day renderings of a proposed stadium design were released. On September 15, 2016, the Southern Nevada Tourism Infrastructure Committee unanimously voted to recommend and approve $750 million for the Las Vegas stadium plan.

Majestic Realty revealed in October 2016 that it had withdrawn from the stadium project.

In October 2016, Sandoval called a special session of the Nevada Legislature to consider the stadium and other tourism-related proposals. The funding bill for the stadium was approved by a 16–5 vote in the Senate and by 28–13 in the Assembly, and was signed into law by Sandoval on October 17. The bill allowed Clark County to increase its hotel tax to raise the $750 million in funding.

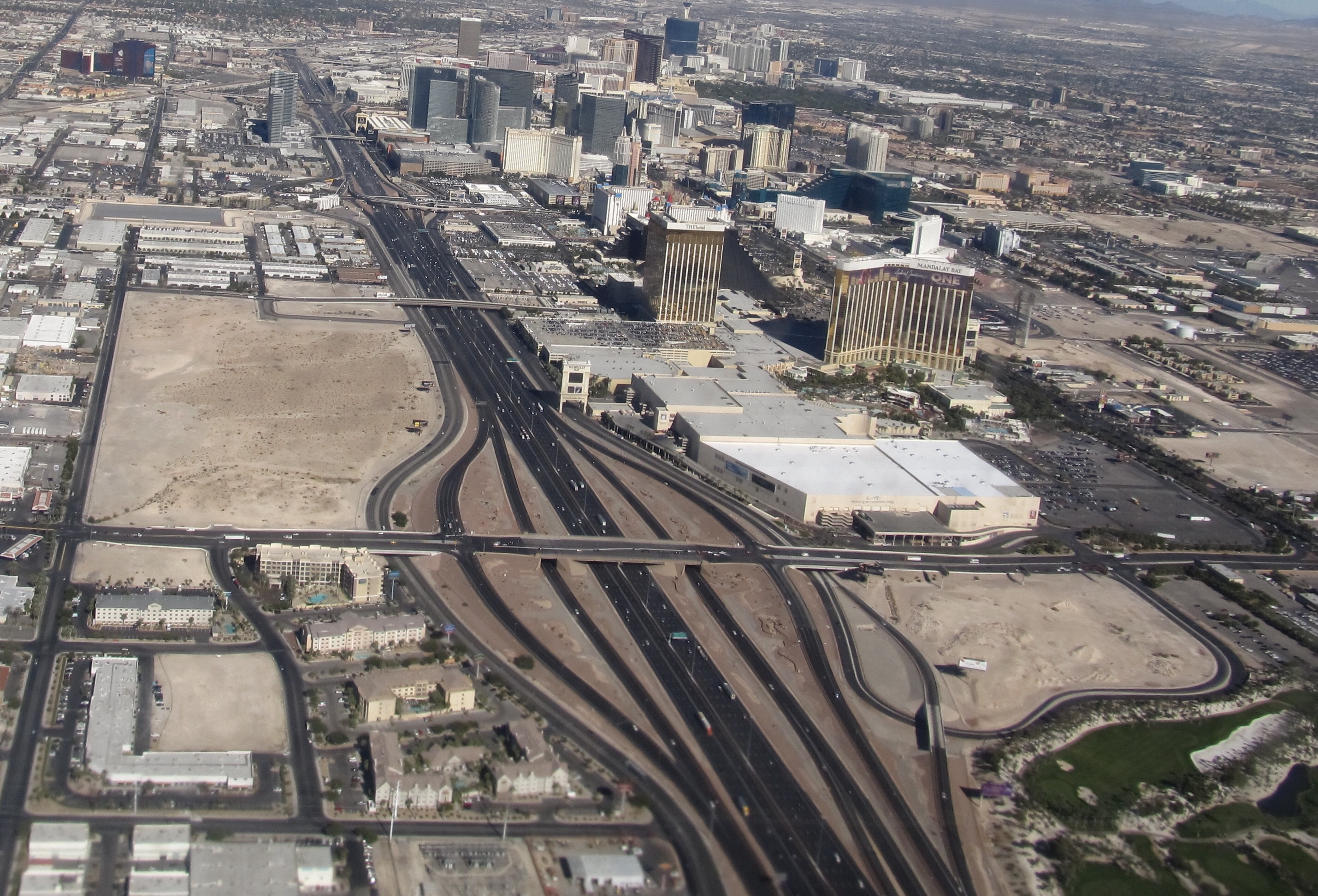
2013 view of the stadium site, adjacent to Mandalay Bay and Interstate 15.

The Raiders filed relocation papers on January 19 to move from Oakland to Las Vegas. On January 26, 2017, the Raiders submitted a proposed lease agreement for the stadium. It was reported that the Raiders had selected the Russell Road site as the stadium location, the team would pay one dollar in rent, and that they could control the naming rights for both the stadium and plaza and in addition keep signage sponsorship revenue.

Days after the Raiders' announced proposal, Adelson dropped out of the stadium project, pulling his proposed $650 million contribution. Shortly after this announcement, Goldman Sachs, which had planned to finance part of the project, withdrew as well. As a result, the Raiders were expected to increase their contribution from $500 million to $1.15 billion.

On March 6, the Raiders revealed Bank of America would lend $650 million to replace the Adelson portion of the funding.

NFL owners voted to approve the move by a margin of 31–1 on March 27. The next day, the Raiders and the Las Vegas Stadium Authority began accepting deposits for season tickets for the new stadium. The Raiders announced that they planned to remain in Oakland until the stadium was complete.

The Raiders closed the purchase of the land for the stadium at the Russell Road site on May 1. The purchase price was reported at $77.5 million. On May 11, it was announced that in a joint venture Mortenson Construction and McCarthy Construction would be the developers for the stadium. Mortenson previously worked on U.S. Bank Stadium in Minneapolis. The stadium authority approved a stadium lease with the Raiders on May 18. The lease was to be for 30 years with four successive extension options of five years each.

=== Construction ===
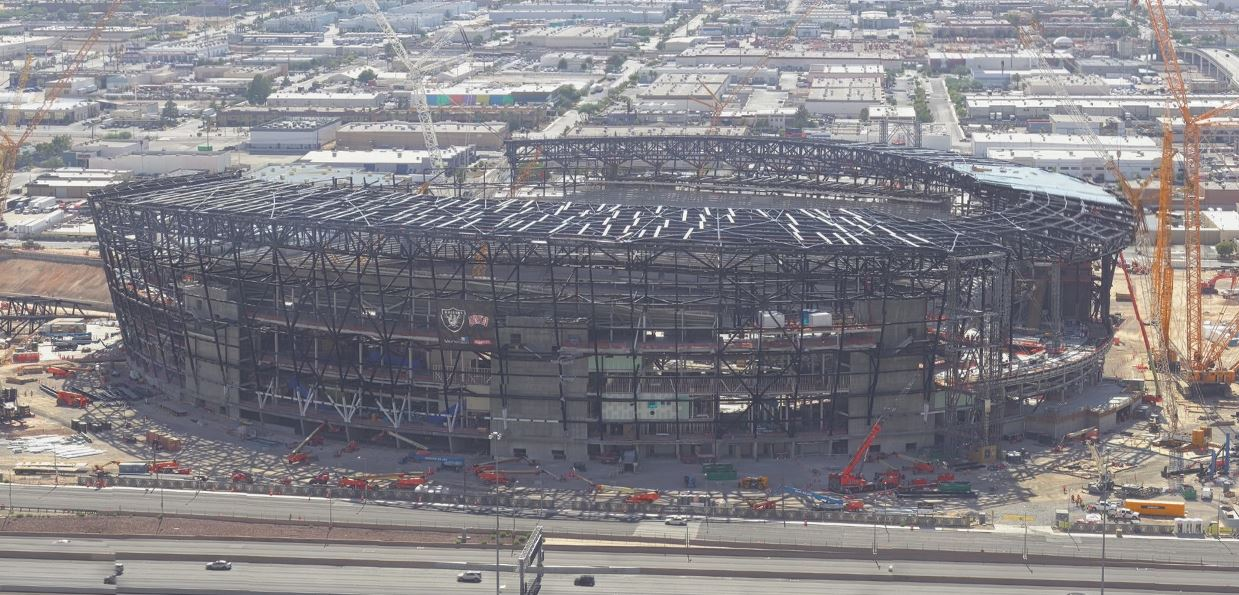
Construction photo taken in July 2019.

On September 18, 2017, construction activity began on the stadium site with site preparation. A groundbreaking ceremony was held on November 13. The ceremony featured NFL Commissioner Roger Goodell, Raiders owner Mark Davis, his mother Carol Davis, various Raiders legends including Howie Long, Jim Plunkett, Tom Flores, Cliff Branch and Ray Guy, Las Vegas and Nevada politicians such as Governor Brian Sandoval, Las Vegas Mayor Carolyn Goodman, Clark County Commissioner Steve Sisolak and stadium authority head Steve Hill. The event was hosted by George Lopez and included other celebrities including Carlos Santana, longtime Vegas icon Wayne Newton, and Howie Dorough and Nick Carter of the Backstreet Boys. It also featured a tribute to the victims of the nearby 2017 Las Vegas shooting, including a performance by Judith Hill and the Las Vegas House of Blues Gospel Choir performing 'Rise up' and the lighting of 58 beams of light, symbolizing the 58 victims who were killed in the attack.

In January, construction crews began blasting caliche rock with dynamite to excavate and create the stadium bowl.

During construction in December 2017, a construction worker "buried a Kansas City Chiefs flag near what [was] expected to be the 50-yard line of the new Raiders stadium".

On August 27, Clark County gave the stadium a new address, rechristening it from its original 5617 Dean Martin Drive address to 3333 Al Davis Way.

On May 24, 2019, it was announced that 20 additional suites would be added to the stadium in the south end zone, with six suites on the main concourse and 14 suites in the lower suite level, one section above the main concourse. The suites were added in an effort to make the stadium more attractive for a Super Bowl.

On January 27, 2023, the Raiders announced additional suites would be added on the 100 level sidelines in advance of the 2023 season and in preparation for hosting Super Bowl LVIII in 2024.

=== Opening ===
Clark County officials declared that the stadium met its substantial completion date on July 31, 2020, meaning it could issue a certificate of occupancy and officially begin leasing the venue to the Las Vegas Raiders. Work would still continue, with the project closeout scheduled for October 2020. The team held its first closed-door practice in the stadium on August 21, with Mark Davis nicknaming his team's new home "The Death Star".

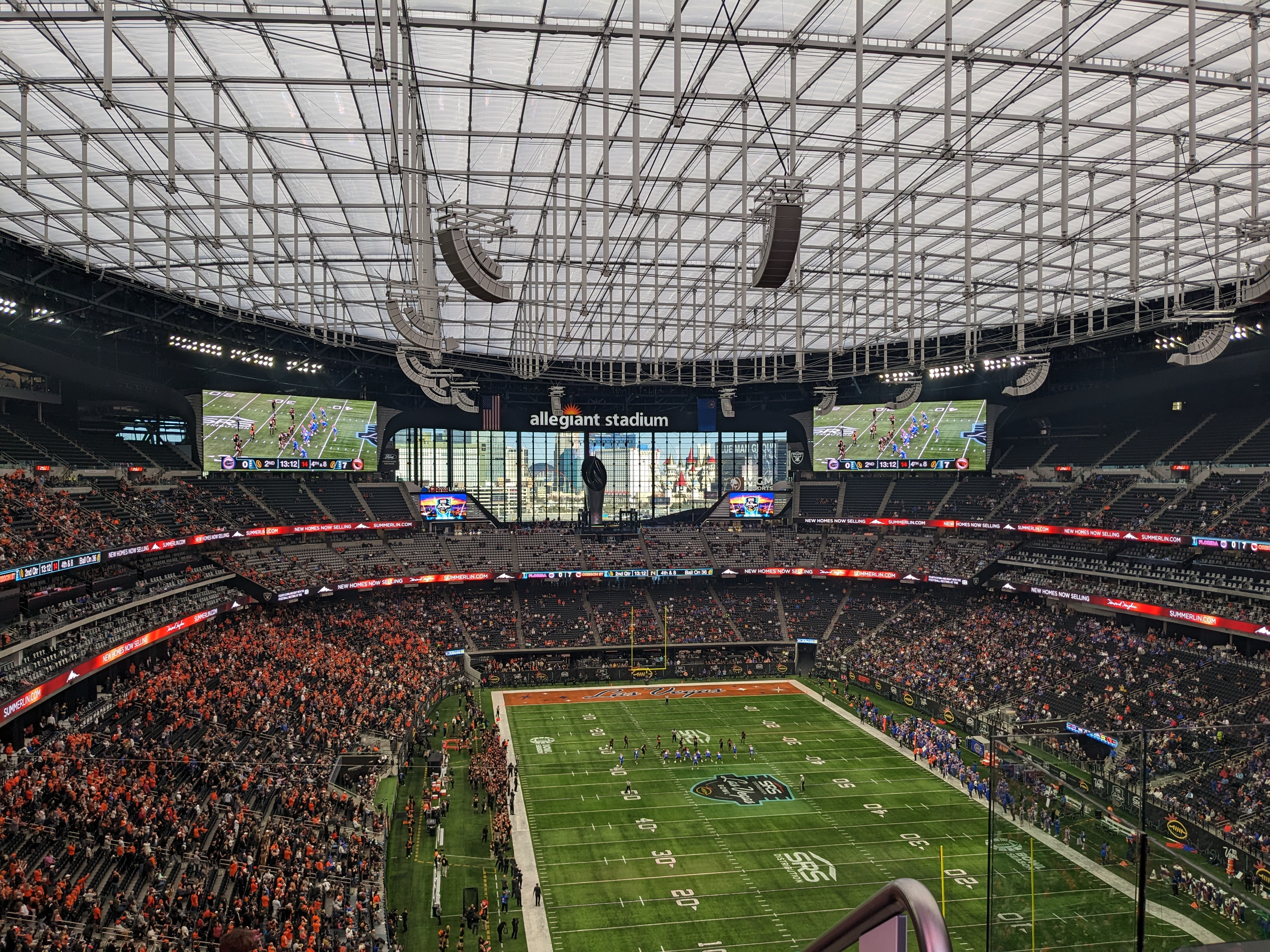
Interior during the 2022 Las Vegas Bowl

The opening of the stadium was complicated by the COVID-19 pandemic in Nevada. The original opening event at the stadium was scheduled to be a Garth Brooks concert, which was postponed to 2021. The Raiders did not admit spectators at any of their games during the 2020 season.

The first event at the stadium was a Monday Night Football game on September 21, 2020, where the Raiders defeated the New Orleans Saints 34–24. Saints kicker Wil Lutz scored the stadium's first points on a 31-yard field goal on the opening drive, and running back Alvin Kamara scored the stadium's first touchdown on a one-yard run at 3:55. The first Raiders touchdown was a second-quarter three-yard touchdown reception by fullback Alec Ingold, one of three touchdown passes on the night for quarterback Derek Carr.

The first UNLV Rebels game at the stadium was on October 31, 2020, a Rebels loss to the Nevada Wolf Pack 37–19 in the Battle for Nevada. The game was the first event in the stadium to have fans in attendance. With the start of the delayed Mountain West Conference season, UNLV played games at a maximum capacity of 2,000 spectators, or 3% of the 65,000 capacity, with seating zones separated by 25 feet and seating no more than 250 people each.

The Raiders played their first game at the stadium with fans in attendance on September 13, 2021, as they defeated the Baltimore Ravens 33–27 in overtime on Monday Night Football. The team required fans entering the stadium to show either proof of COVID-19 vaccination or receive a vaccination at the stadium and wear masks.

== Financing ==
The original budget for construction of the stadium was $1.8 billion. The budget was increased twice in 2019. The first time was in May 2019 when the trusses had to be retrofitted. Don Webb received an additional $40 million at the May 23, 2020, Stadium Authority Board meeting to cover the overages. The second time was in September 2019. Don Webb received another $90 million to cover the extra shifts required to fix the broken truss issue. The overages increased the new budget to $1.97 billion; $200 million over the original budget of $1.8 billion. Ultimately, the stadium was completed $25 million under the increased budget but $175 million over the original $1.8 billion budget.

Of this $2 billion, $78 million was spent to purchase the land, $1.33 billion was spent on construction, $123 million on furniture, fixtures, and equipment, $234 million on design and engineering, and $31 million on utilities and infrastructure. Some reports gave a budget of $2 billion, which also included $100 million to build a separate Raiders practice facility.

The financing for the project came in the form of $750 million in public funding and $1.1 billion from the Raiders. The public portion of the funding came from municipal bonds issued by Clark County, backed by the proceeds of a special tax on hotel rooms in the Las Vegas area, which took effect in March 2017. The Raiders' contribution included a $650 million loan from Bank of America, $200 million from the NFL's stadium loan program, and $300 million from sales of personal seat licenses at the stadium, naming rights for the stadium, and sponsorships. On August 5, 2019, the Raiders announced the team had reached an agreement with Summerlin-based Allegiant Air's owner, Allegiant Travel Company, for the naming rights for the first 30 years of the stadium's use beginning in 2020.

Local government does not receive any rent or revenue sharing from the stadium, because such an arrangement would not be compatible with the tax-exempt status of the bonds that were issued for stadium construction. Proponents instead argued that the public financing would be justified by increased economic activity and tax revenue related to the stadium. Critics have argued that the economic projections were based on overly optimistic assumptions.

A total of $645 million in construction bonds sold out in 90 minutes in April 2018, representing Clark County's contribution to the project beyond room taxes already collected.

== Tenants and events ==
The stadium serves as the home of the Las Vegas Raiders and replaced Sam Boyd Stadium as home of UNLV Rebels football.

=== College football ===
==== Pac-12 Football Championship Game ====
On July 24, 2019, the Pac-12 Conference announced that the 2020 and 2021 Pac-12 Football Championship Game would be played at Allegiant Stadium, moving from Levi's Stadium.

==== Las Vegas Bowl ====
Allegiant Stadium is the host of the Las Vegas Bowl, which moved from Sam Boyd Stadium. The game features a team from the Pac-12 against a team from the SEC or Big Ten, alternating annually. The inaugural game was expected to be held in 2020, but that year's edition of the Las Vegas Bowl was cancelled due to the COVID-19 pandemic. The inaugural 2021 edition featured Wisconsin defeating Arizona State 20–13.

==== Vegas Kickoff Classic ====
In March 2021, a new neutral site college football game dubbed the Vegas Kickoff Classic was announced. Administered by the Las Vegas Bowl, the game is a yearly neutral site college football game that takes place each September. The inaugural edition featured the BYU Cougars defeating the Arizona Wildcats 24–16 on September 4, 2021. The official attendance was 54,541. In September 2024 the USC Trojans defeated LSU 27–20. The attendance of 63,969 was a record for a college football game in Nevada.

==== East–West Shrine Bowl ====
In July 2021, it was announced that Allegiant Stadium would host the East–West Shrine Bowl on February 3, 2022, as part of the NFL Pro Bowl week. After hosting two editions of the all-star game, organizers moved the bowl to Ford Center at The Star in Frisco, Texas, starting with the 2024 edition.

==== Shamrock Series (Notre Dame-BYU) ====
In September 2021, it was announced that Allegiant Stadium was to host a college football game between the Notre Dame Fighting Irish and the BYU Cougars on October 8, 2022, as part of Notre Dame's Shamrock Series, with the Fighting Irish as the home team.

==== College Football Playoff (CFP) National Championship ====
The stadium was the original host of the 2025 title game but did not happen because of a dates conflict with the Consumer Electronics Show (CES) at the nearby Las Vegas Convention Center. The stadium will host the 2027 National Championship game on January 25, 2027.

Date	Winning Team	Result	Losing Team	Event	Attendance
January 25, 2027		–		College Football Playoff National Championship	

=== NFL ===
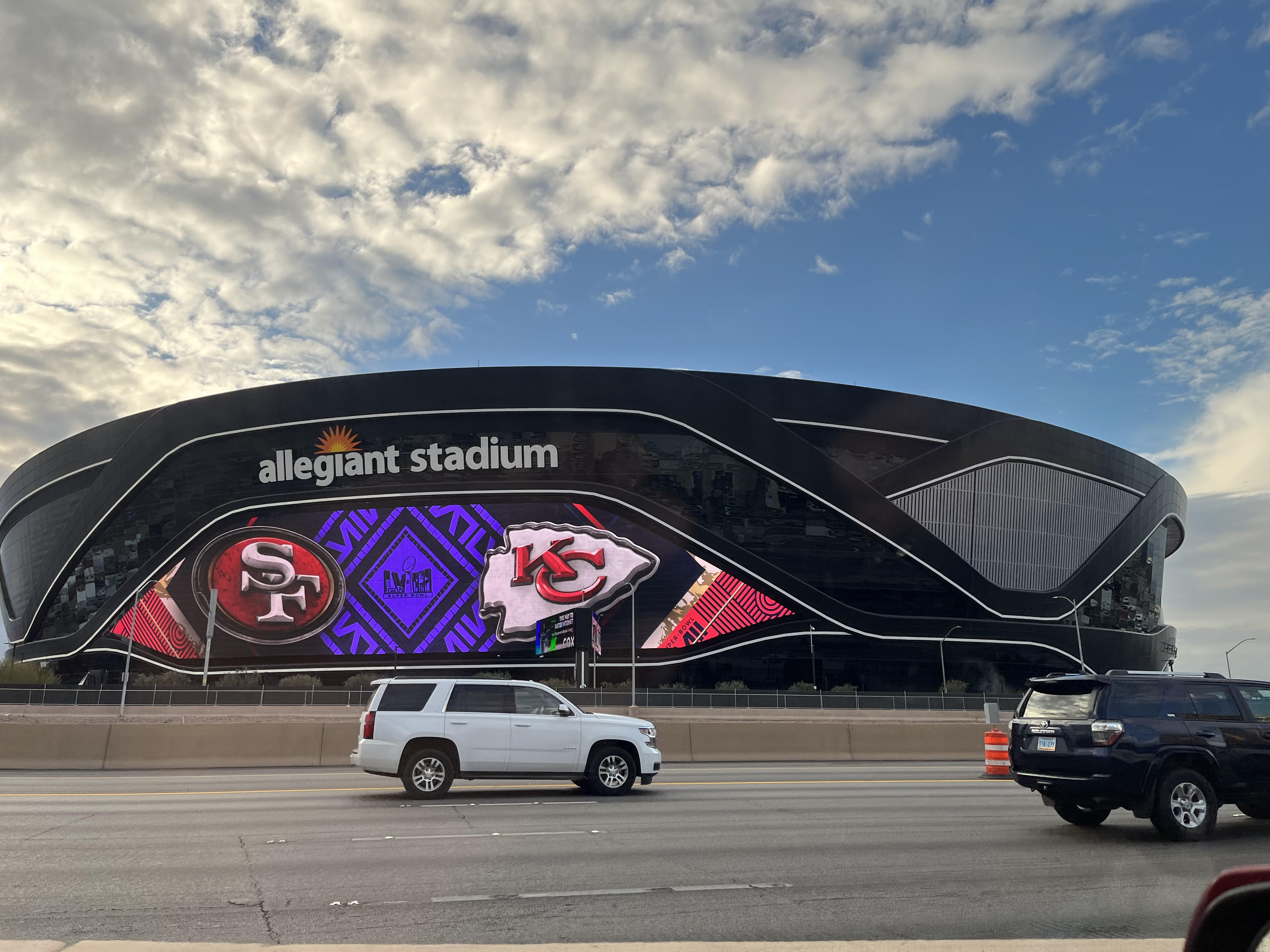
Allegiant Stadium pictured a week before Super Bowl LVIII

==== Pro Bowl ====
On June 16, 2020, the NFL announced that the stadium would host the 2021 Pro Bowl. The game was deferred to 2022 due to the COVID-19 pandemic. The game featured the American Football Conference defeating the National Football Conference by a score of 41–35. The 2023 Pro Bowl Games was hosted on Sunday February 5, 2023, with the NFC defeating the AFC 35–33.

==== Super Bowl ====
Allegiant Stadium hosted Super Bowl LVIII between the Kansas City Chiefs and San Francisco 49ers on February 11, 2024.

Allegiant Stadium will host Super Bowl LXIII on February 11, 2029.

Date	Winning Team	Result	Losing Team	Event	Attendance
February 11, 2024	Kansas City Chiefs	25–22 (OT)	San Francisco 49ers	Super Bowl LVIII	61,629
February 11, 2029		–		Super Bowl LXIII	

=== Soccer ===
Allegiant Stadium hosted the 2021 CONCACAF Gold Cup final on August 1, 2021.

The stadium also hosted the final of the 2021 Leagues Cup between Major League Soccer and Liga MX teams.

The stadium hosted three matches during the 2024 Copa América: two group stage matches and a quarterfinal.

Date	Winning Team	Result	Losing Team	Event	Attendance
August 1, 2021	United States	1–0 (a.e.t.)	Mexico	2021 CONCACAF Gold Cup Final	61,514
September 22, 2021	(Mexico) León	3–2	(United States) Seattle Sounders FC	2021 Leagues Cup Final	24,824
July 16, 2022	(England) Chelsea	2–1	(Mexico) América	Club Friendly	47,223
July 22, 2022	(Italy) Juventus	2–0	(Mexico) Guadalajara	Club Friendly	31,261
July 23, 2022	(Spain) Barcelona	1–0	(Spain) Real Madrid	Club Friendly	61,299
June 15, 2023	Canada	2–0	Panama	2023 CONCACAF Nations League Finals	65,000
June 15, 2023	United States	3–0	Mexico	2023 CONCACAF Nations League Finals	65,000
June 18, 2023	Mexico	1–0	Panama	2023 CONCACAF Nations League Finals	35,000
June 18, 2023	United States	2–0	Canada	2023 CONCACAF Nations League Final	35,000
July 12, 2023	Mexico	3–0	Jamaica	2023 CONCACAF Gold Cup semi-final	29,886
July 30, 2023	(Germany) Borussia Dortmund	3–2	(England) Manchester United	Club Friendly	50,254
August 1, 2023	(Spain) Barcelona	1–0	(Italy) Milan	Club Friendly	38,986
June 26, 2024	Ecuador	3–1	Jamaica	2024 Copa América Group B	24,074
June 28, 2024	Brazil	4–1	Paraguay	2024 Copa América Group D	46,939
July 6, 2024	Uruguay	0–0 (4–2 pen.)	Brazil	2024 Copa América quarterfinals	55,770
January 18, 2025	(United States) Inter Miami	2–2 (3–2 pen.)	(Mexico) Club América	Club Friendly	45,262
June 22, 2025	Saudi Arabia	1–1	Trinidad and Tobago	2025 CONCACAF Gold Cup Group D	35,000
June 22, 2025	Mexico	0–0	Costa Rica	2025 CONCACAF Gold Cup Group A	35,000

=== Concerts ===
Date	Artist	Opening act(s)	Tour / Concert name	Attendance	Revenue	Notes
July 3, 2021	Illenium	3lau CloudNone	Trilogy	35,000 / 40,000	$3,900,000	First concert at the stadium
July 10, 2021	Garth Brooks		The Garth Brooks Stadium Tour	68,000 / 68,000	$5,440,500	First "major" (Note: Brooks' concert was originally scheduled to be the first concert to be played at the stadium, but was postponed to the week after Illenium's concert. Illenium played to 35,000 people while Brooks played to the near capacity of 68,000) concert at Allegiant Stadium.
August 27, 2021	Guns N' Roses	Mammoth WVH	Guns N' Roses 2020 Tour	36,096 / 37,000	$4,140,215	Promoted as "first ever rock show" at the stadium.
November 6, 2021	The Rolling Stones	Måneskin	No Filter Tour	42,600 / 42,600	$14,804,562	
February 25, 2022	Metallica	Greta Van Fleet; Ice Nine Kills	2021–2022 Tour	44,352 / 44,352	$7,608,341	
February 26, 2022	Billy Joel		Billy Joel in Concert	35,704 / 35,704	$6,220,345	
March 21, 2022	OneRepublic	Walk the Moon	Private concert for Chipotle Mexican Grill	N/A	N/A	
April 8, 2022	BTS		Permission to Dance on Stage	199,697 / 199,697	$35,944,850	
April 9, 2022	BTS		Permission to Dance on Stage	199,697 / 199,697	$35,944,850	
April 15, 2022	BTS		Permission to Dance on Stage	199,697 / 199,697	$35,944,850	
April 16, 2022	BTS		Permission to Dance on Stage	199,697 / 199,697	$35,944,850	
June 7, 2022	Garth Brooks		Private concert for State Farm	N/A	N/A	
August 6, 2022	Red Hot Chili Peppers	The Strokes; Thundercat	Red Hot Chili Peppers 2022 Global Stadium Tour	44,045 / 44,045	$8,469,298	
August 12, 2022	Los Bukis			N/A	N/A	
August 20, 2022	The Weeknd	Kaytranada; Mike Dean	After Hours til Dawn Stadium Tour	44,321 / 44,321	$8,267,750	
September 9, 2022	Mötley Crüe; Def Leppard	Poison; Joan Jett & the Blackhearts; Classless Act	The Stadium Tour	37,845 / 37,845	$5,539,489	
September 10, 2022	Imagine Dragons	Macklemore; Kings Elliot	Mercury Tour	40,262 / 40,262	$3,789,234	Concert was made into a movie released on Hulu.
September 15, 2022	Grupo Firme		Enfiestados y Amanecidos Tour	N/A	N/A	
September 23, 2022	Bad Bunny	Diplo	World's Hottest Tour	92,440 / 92,440	$22,098,725	
September 24, 2022	Bad Bunny	Diplo	World's Hottest Tour	92,440 / 92,440	$22,098,725	
November 1, 2022	Elton John		Farewell Yellow Brick Road	45,792 / 45,792	$7,997,827	
March 24, 2023	Taylor Swift	Beabadoobee; Gayle	The Eras Tour	N/A	N/A	First female headliner.
March 25, 2023	Taylor Swift	Beabadoobee; Gayle	The Eras Tour	N/A	N/A	First female headliner.
April 1, 2023	Red Hot Chili Peppers	St. Vincent; King Princess	Red Hot Chili Peppers 2022 Global Stadium Tour	39,884 / 39,884	$4,576,971	
June 7, 2023	Blake Shelton Gwen Stefani		Private concert for Cisco	N/A	N/A	
August 10, 2023	Karol G	Agudelo	Mañana Será Bonito Tour	31,902 / 31,902	$7,212,809	
August 18, 2023	Blackpink		Born Pink World Tour	44,171 / 44,171	$11,429,130	The first K-Pop girl group to hold a concert at this venue.
August 26, 2023	Beyoncé	MEZ	Renaissance World Tour	86,465 / 86,465	$25,784,512	
August 27, 2023	Beyoncé	MEZ	Renaissance World Tour	86,465 / 86,465	$25,784,512	
October 7, 2023	Pink	Brandi Carlile; Grouplove; KidCutUp	P!NK: Summer Carnival 2023	54,693 / 54,693	$8,969,920	
October 28, 2023	Ed Sheeran	Russ; Maisie Peters	+–=÷× Tour	57,622 / 57,622	N/A	Rescheduled from September 9, 2023, due to safety issues from a partial stage collapse.
March 16, 2024	Twice	Vcha	Ready to Be World Tour	39,880 / 39,880	N/A	
May 11, 2024	The Rolling Stones	The Pretty Reckless	Hackney Diamonds Tour	44,347 / 44,347	$15,579,874	
June 5, 2024	Elton John		Private concert for Cisco	N/A	N/A	
August 8, 2024	Morgan Wallen	Jelly Roll; Nate Smith; Ella Langley	One Night At a Time World Tour	N/A	N/A	
August 9, 2024	Morgan Wallen	Bailey Zimmerman; Nate Smith; Ella Langley	One Night At a Time World Tour	N/A	N/A	
September 13, 2024	Pink	Sheryl Crow; KidCutUp; The Script	P!NK: Summer Carnival	N/A	N/A	
November 9, 2024	Billy Joel & Sting			N/A	N/A	
December 7, 2024	George Strait	Chris Stapleton; Little Big Town		47,554 / 47,554	$23,315,155	The most expensive stadium-concert in history, with $490.29 average price per ticket
March 29, 2025	Mayday		#5525 Live Tour	N/A	N/A	First Taiwanese singer holding concert at this stadium
April 2, 2025	Pitbull		Private concert for Wynn employees	N/A	N/A	
April 10, 2025	The Killers		Private concert for Google	N/A	N/A	
April 26, 2025	AC/DC	The Pretty Reckless	Power Up Tour	N/A	N/A	
May 3, 2025	Post Malone; Jelly Roll	Sierra Ferrell	Big Ass Stadium Tour	52,890 / 52.890	$9,310,455	
May 17, 2025	Stevie Wonder		Private concert for Raiders foundation	N/A	N/A	
May 31, 2025	Kendrick Lamar; SZA	Mustard	Grand National Tour	N/A	N/A	
June 6, 2025	Coldplay	Willow; Elyanna	Music of the Spheres World Tour	100,335 / 100,335	$13,959,982	
June 7, 2025	Coldplay	Willow; Elyanna	Music of the Spheres World Tour	100,335 / 100,335	$13,959,982	
June 28, 2025	Shakira		Las Mujeres Ya No Lloran World Tour	47,058 / 47,058	$6,667,413	
July 5, 2025	The Weeknd	Playboi Carti; Mike Dean	After Hours til Dawn Tour	52,441 / 52,441	$10,041,464	The 1st show on July 4, 2025 was cancelled because of "production load in issues"
July 25, 2025	Beyoncé		Cowboy Carter Tour	92,269 / 92,269	$19,443,320	
July 26, 2025	Beyoncé		Cowboy Carter Tour	92,269 / 92,269	$19,443,320	
September 19, 2025	Chris Brown	Summer Walker; Bryson Tiller	Breezy Bowl XX	89,658 / 89,658	$15,848,974	
September 20, 2025	Chris Brown	Summer Walker; Bryson Tiller	Breezy Bowl XX	89,658 / 89,658	$15,848,974	
October 4, 2025	Paul McCartney		Got Back	N/A	N/A	
March 21, 2026	Luke Combs		My Kinda Saturday Night	70,921 / 70,921	N/A	concert attendance record 70,921
April 10, 2026	Bruno Mars	DJ Pee .Wee; Leon Thomas	The Romantic Tour	N/A	N/A	
April 11, 2026	Bruno Mars	DJ Pee .Wee; Leon Thomas	The Romantic Tour	N/A	N/A	
April 23, 2026	Benson Boone Weezer		Private concert for Google	N/A	N/A	
May 1, 2026	Morgan Wallen	Brooks & Dunn; Gavin Adcock; Vincent Mason	Still The Problem Tour	N/A	N/A	
May 2, 2026	Morgan Wallen	Thomas Rhett; Gavin Adcock; Vincent Mason	Still The Problem Tour	N/A	N/A	
May 13, 2026	Pink		Private concert for State Farm	N/A	N/A	
May 17, 2026	Elton John		Private concert for Raiders foundation	N/A	N/A	
May 23, 2026	BTS		Arirang World Tour	245,820 / 245,820	$49,493,775	
May 24, 2026	BTS		Arirang World Tour	245,820 / 245,820	$49,493,775	
May 27, 2026	BTS		Arirang World Tour	245,820 / 245,820	$49,493,775	
May 28, 2026	BTS		Arirang World Tour	245,820 / 245,820	$49,493,775	
June 3, 2026	Maroon 5 & The Chainsmokers		Private concert for Cisco	N/A	N/A	
June 6, 2026	Big & Rich		Day of Gratitude	N/A	N/A	
June 17, 2026	Imagine Dragons & Steve Aoki		Private concert for Hewlett Packard Enterprise	N/A	N/A	
July 10, 2026	Fuerza Regida			N/A	N/A	
July 18, 2026	Ed Sheeran	Myles Smith; Sigrid; Aaron Rowe	Loop Tour	N/A	N/A	
August 1, 2026	AC/DC	The Pretty Reckless	Power Up Tour	N/A	N/A	
August 7, 2026	Karol G		Viajando Por El Mundo Tropitour	45,177 / 45,177	$10,628,315	
August 22, 2026	Guns N' Roses	The Black Crowes	2026 World Tour	N/A	N/A	
September 5, 2026	Usher & Chris Brown		The R&B Tour	N/A	N/A	
September 6, 2026	Usher & Chris Brown		The R&B Tour	N/A	N/A	
September 18, 2026	Usher & Chris Brown		The R&B Tour	N/A	N/A	
September 26, 2026	Foo Fighters	Queens Of The Stone Age; Gouge Away	Take Cover Tour	N/A	N/A	
December 11, 2026	Luke Bryan & Jason Aldean		Double Down Tour			
May 21, 2027	Noah Kahan					
July 16, 2027	Zach Bryan	Ryan Bingham and The Texas Gentlemen; Gabriella Rose	Young Manhood And Other Donatable Organs Tour			
August 20, 2027	Oasis					
August 21, 2027	Oasis					
August 24, 2027	Oasis					

=== Professional wrestling ===
Date	Event	Promotion	Main Event	Attendance	Notes
August 21, 2021	SummerSlam	WWE	Roman Reigns (c) vs. John Cena for the WWE Universal Championship	45,690	First professional wrestling event held at the stadium
April 19, 2025	WrestleMania 41	WWE	Roman Reigns vs. CM Punk vs. Seth Rollins	58,538	Highest grossing event in WWE history.
April 20, 2025	WrestleMania 41	WWE	Cody Rhodes (c) vs. John Cena for the Undisputed WWE Championship	60,103	Highest grossing event in WWE history.
April 18, 2026	WrestleMania 42	WWE	Cody Rhodes (c) vs. Randy Orton for the Undisputed WWE Championship	47,093	
April 19, 2026	WrestleMania 42	WWE	CM Punk (c) vs. Roman Reigns for the World Heavyweight Championship	50,033	

=== Combat sports ===
On June 18, 2025, it was announced that the stadium would host Riyadh Season's TKO boxing event, headlined by Canelo Álvarez vs. Terence Crawford on September 13, 2025. This would mark the first time the stadium would hold a combat sports event. Terence Crawford won the fight by unanimous decision in front of 70,482. It also set the venue’s single-day live gate record by pulling in $47,231,887.

=== Awards ceremonies ===
On November 18, 2021, it was announced that Allegiant Stadium would host the 57th Academy of Country Music Awards on March 7, 2022.

=== Final Four ===
On November 22, 2022, the NCAA Division I Men's Basketball Committee selected the stadium to host Las Vegas' first Final Four and National Championship games on April 1–3, 2028.

=== Rugby league ===
Two matches in the first round of the 2024 National Rugby League season were played at Allegiant Stadium on March 2, 2024, marking the first time a regular season game was played outside Australia and New Zealand. Two more matches in the 2025 campaign's first round, as well as a women's test between England and Australia and the first regular season Super League match in North America, (Note: The Toronto Wolfpack were scheduled to hold Super League matches in Canada during the 2020 season, which was their first season in the Super League, but they withdrew from the competition (and later English rugby league as a whole) due to the COVID-19 pandemic in Canada.) were scheduled for March 1, 2025. Further games at the stadium are planned as the event is under a five-year contract. The results of the matches were as follows:

Date	Winning Team	Result	Losing Team	Attendance	Ref.
March 2, 2024	Manly Warringah Sea Eagles	36–24	South Sydney Rabbitohs	31,927	
March 2, 2024	Sydney Roosters	20–10	Brisbane Broncos	31,927	
March 1, 2025	Wigan Warriors	48–24	Warrington Wolves	38,107	
March 1, 2025	Canberra Raiders	30–8	New Zealand Warriors	38,107	
March 1, 2025	Australia Jillaroos	90–4	England Lionesses	38,107	
March 1, 2025	Penrith Panthers	28–22	Cronulla-Sutherland Sharks	38,107	
February 28, 2026	Hull Kingston Rovers	6–58	Leeds Rhinos	37,557	
February 28, 2026	Newcastle Knights	28–18	North Queensland Cowboys	37,557	
February 28, 2026	Canterbury-Bankstown Bulldogs	15–14	St George Illawarra Dragons	37,557	

== See also ==
- T-Mobile Arena, the home of the National Hockey League's Vegas Golden Knights
- New Las Vegas Stadium, the future home of Major League Baseball's Las Vegas Athletics
- Oakland Raiders relocation to Las Vegas
- Las Vegas Ballpark, the current home of the Pacific Coast League's Las Vegas Aviators
- Lists of stadiums

== Notes ==
Events and tenants
Preceded by Oakland Coliseum	Home of the Las Vegas Raiders; 2020–present	Succeeded by Current
Preceded by Camping World Stadium	Host of the Pro Bowl; 2021–2023	Succeeded by Camping World Stadium
Preceded by State Farm Stadium	Host of the Super Bowl; LVIII 2024	Succeeded by Caesars Superdome
Preceded by Sam Boyd Stadium	Home of the UNLV Rebels football 2020–present	Succeeded by Current
Preceded by Sam Boyd Stadium	Host of the Las Vegas Bowl; 2021–present	Succeeded by Current
Preceded by First stadium	Host of the Vegas Kickoff Classic; 2021–present	Succeeded by Current
Preceded by Lincoln Financial Field	Host of WrestleMania; 2025–2026 (41 and 42)	Succeeded by King Fahd Sports City Stadium
