= Bill Pidto =

American journalist (born 1965)

- Born: April 20, 1965 (age 61); Palo Alto, California, U.S.
- Occupations: Anchor, Radio Personality, Journalist
- Known for: Former radio personality on Mad Dog Radio on the show The B-Team; Former journalist for ESPN

Bill Pidto (born April 20, 1965) is an American journalist who is currently an anchor for MSG Network's coverage of New York Rangers road games and select New York Knicks games. He was formerly a radio personality on Mad Dog Radio on the show The B-Team and worked for ESPN from 1993 to 2008. He was often seen as one of the anchors for ESPNews.

== Early years ==
As a native of Palo Alto, California, Pidto was a 1987 graduate of Cornell University where he earned a Bachelor of Arts degree in psychology. At Cornell he began his broadcasting career as a sports anchor and reporter for WVBR, a radio station in Ithaca, New York. He was also a member of the Delta Chi fraternity.

== Career ==
Pidto spent the following two years as the Sports director at WBNG-TV, located in Binghamton, New York. In 1989, he left WBNG for a sports anchor job at WSTM-TV in Syracuse, though he spent only a year at this station before moving on to the short-lived Sports News Network in 1990. He broke in with ESPN as a field producer for the network's Scholastic Sports America, program for two years. In 1992, he also spent time as a sports anchor for New England Cable News.

When ESPN2 was launched in 1993, Pidto was hired to anchor the program SportsSmash, and hosted NHL 2Night when it debuted in 1995. That same year, Pidto also joined NFL Primetime. During his tenure at ESPN he has also served as an anchor for Baseball Tonight. Prior to his work at ESPN, he worked at the Sports News Network.

On coverage of the New York Knicks, Pidto served anchor duties when either Al Trautwig was unavailable for a home game or when the Knicks were on the road (when the Rangers or Knicks were at home, Al Trautwig did the pre-game and halftime/intermission reports from the Geico Studio Suite on the 7th floor of MSG). When both the Knicks and Rangers are playing, Bill Pidto routinely does the pre-game, post-game, and intermission reports for the New York Rangers.

Pidto is also one of the hosts for NHL Live on NHL Network.

== See also ==
- List of ESPN personalities
- List of ESPNews personalities
