= Michael Kim (television anchor) =

American television sports anchor

Michael Kim (born in Columbia, Missouri) is an American television sports personality and is currently an anchor for Stadium.

Kim was the lead presenter for SportsCenter on ESPN America, viewed in 67 countries and territories in Europe, the Middle East and North Africa. This edition of SportsCenter, which launched March 1, 2010, also airs on ESPN (UK).

Kim joined ESPN as one of the original presenters on ESPNEWS prior to its November 1, 1996, launch. In his 17 years at ESPN, he has also contributed as an anchor to ESPN's SportsCenter and other ESPNEWS and information programming including First Take and NHL 2Night.

== School ==
Kim graduated from Fulton High School in Fulton, Missouri in 1982. He was a three-sport athlete for the FHS football, basketball, and baseball teams. He was a three-year letterman in football, playing quarterback and wide receiver, and earned all-conference honors as a punter in 1981. A four-year letterman in baseball, Kim was named to the all-conference team three times and twice to the all-district team as an outfielder.

Kim continued his baseball career at Westminster College in Fulton. He graduated in 1987 with a bachelor's degree in political science and business administration. He earned a master's in journalism from the University of Missouri in 1991.

Kim delivered the commencement address at Westminster College in May 2008 when he was awarded an honorary doctorate degree.

On January 28, 2012, Kim was inducted into the Fulton High School Wall of Fame, along with U.S. Army (Ret.) Maj. Gen. Byron Bagby and former FHS basketball and baseball coach Darrell Davis.

== Career ==
=== Prior to ESPN ===
From 1991 until joining ESPN in 1996, Kim worked at NewsChannel 8 in Springfield, Virginia. While there in 1993, he was awarded an Emmy for sports reporting on a series called "Local Heroes," which was also recognized as the "Best Sports Series" by the Society of Professional Journalists. He also received an award from the National Association of Black Journalists for "Best Sports Feature."

=== ESPN ===
Kim joined ESPNEWS November 1, 1996, prior to its premiere and he has been one of the faces of the network. In addition to ESPNEWS he served as an alternate host for the NHL 2Night program and handled the SportsCenter update duties on Mike and Mike in the Morning and ESPN First Take.

Kim co-anchored his final SportsCenter broadcast on December 14, 2013, alongside Jaymee Sire. He left ESPN after that show.
