= Michelle Bonner =

American journalist and businesswoman (born 1972)

- Born: June 6, 1972 (age 54)
- Education: Northeastern University
- Occupation: News Anchor

Michelle Bonner is an American journalist and businesswoman.

== Career ==
A native of Marblehead, Massachusetts, Bonner graduated from Northeastern University with a bachelor's degree in English in 1994. She began her broadcasting career at WCHS-TV as a news producer and fill-in sports anchor/reporter in Charleston, West Virginia, and also worked in Manchester, New Hampshire, and Bangor, Maine. She then was a sports anchor/reporter at KRIV in Houston from 1997 to 1999.

Bonner was the main sports anchor at Los Angeles' KCOP-TV from 1999 to 2002. In 2000, she earned an Emmy award for "Best Newscast". Bonner won the Edward R. Murrow Award of Excellence in Journalism in 2001 for a feature story on Marlin Briscoe, the first black starting quarterback in the NFL. That same year, she received the Associated Press Award and Golden Mike for "Best Sportscast".

=== National networks ===
Bonner was a sports anchor at Fox Sports in Los Angeles from 2002 to 2003. She then moved to CNN in Atlanta, Georgia, where she was a sports anchor from 2003 to 2005. In March 2005, she joined ESPN as an ESPNews anchor and occasionally anchored SportsCenter, ESPN's flagship sports news program. On May 14, 2012, it was announced that Bonner and ESPN had decided to part ways after seven years.

=== Post-ESPN ===
Bonner now runs her own public relations consulting group.
