= Dari Nowkhah =

American sports anchor (born 1976)

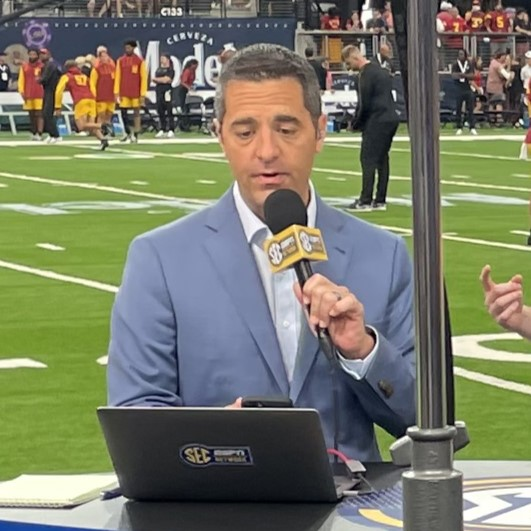
- Nowkhah doing a read ahead of the 2024 Vegas Kickoff Classic
- Born: Darius Behzad Nowkhah; June 23, 1976 (age 50); Tulsa, Oklahoma
- Education: University of Oklahoma '98
- Title: SEC Network Lead Anchor
- Website: espnpressroom.com/us/bios/nowkhah_dari/

Dari Nowkhah, reading a report on the sideline of Allegiant Stadium before the 2024 Vegas Kickoff Classic for the SEC Network as members of Cirque du Soleil's Mad Apple and commentator Jordan Rodgers dance.

Darius Behzad "Dari" Nowkhah (born June 23, 1976) is the lead anchor at SEC Network, an American sports television network (he was chosen as a head anchor when it began airing in August 21, 2014). Nowkhah hosts extensive college football and college basketball programming for the collegiate network and also provides play-by-play for the network's college basketball and college baseball coverage.

Nowkhah's move to ESPNU's Charlotte, NC headquarters came after seven years in Bristol, CT where he hosted a variety of shows for ESPN. Among the shows Nowkhah hosted were SportsCenter, Baseball Tonight and College Football Live.

He fills in as a host on a variety of other ESPN Radio programs. Before working at ESPN, Nowkhah worked at KCFW-TV in Kalispell, Montana, as well as KLKN-TV in Lincoln, Nebraska and KOTV in Tulsa.

Nowkhah graduated from Union High School in Tulsa, Oklahoma, and then from the University of Oklahoma in 1998 with a degree in broadcast journalism.

== Personal life ==
Nowkhah and his wife Jenn have four children. On Tuesday, September 20, 2011, Nowkhah announced the death of his infant son, Hayden, who died from complications arising from myocarditis, a viral infection that compromised the heart. He and his wife have since set up Hayden's Hope, a foundation dedicated to helping families cover expenses due to their children's organ transplants.

Nowkhah is the son of Cy Nowkhah, a 1975 University of Tulsa graduate who immigrated to the United States from Iran in 1969.
