= Barry Melrose =

Canadian and American ice hockey player, coach and broadcaster (1956–2026)

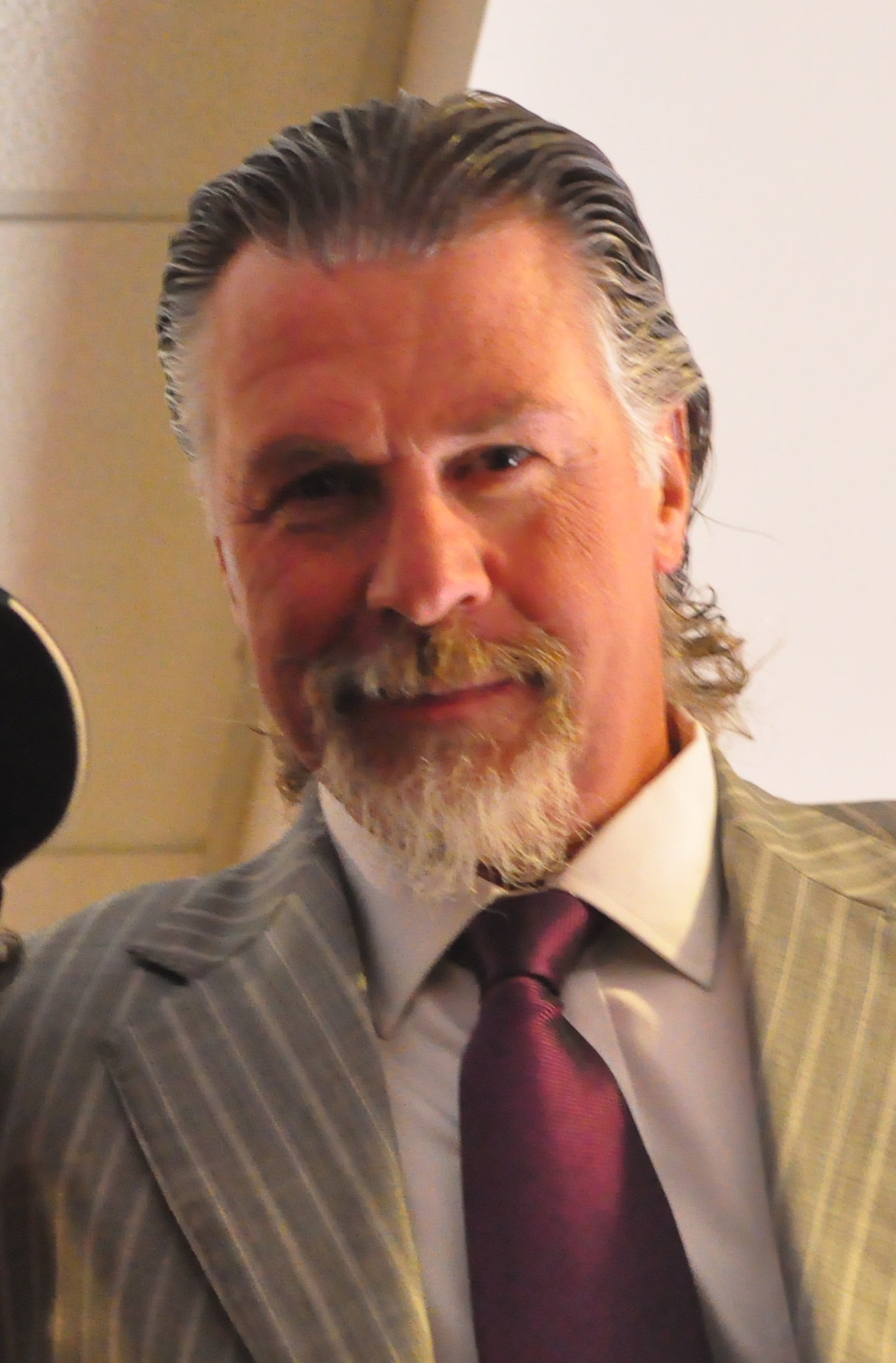
- Melrose in 2010
- Born: July 15, 1956 Kelvington, Saskatchewan, Canada
- Died: September 9, 2026 (aged 70) Glens Falls, New York
- Height: 6 ft 0 in (183 cm)
- Weight: 205 lb (93 kg; 14 st 9 lb)
- Position: Defence
- Shot: Right
- Played for: Cincinnati Stingers; Winnipeg Jets; Toronto Maple Leafs; Detroit Red Wings
- NHL draft: 36th overall, 1976; Montreal Canadiens
- WHA draft: 37th overall, 1976; Cincinnati Stingers
- Playing career: 1974–1987
- Coaching career: 1987–2008

Barry James Melrose (July 15, 1956 – September 9, 2026) was a Canadian and American professional ice hockey player, coach and broadcaster. He played in the World Hockey Association (WHA) and National Hockey League (NHL). After retiring from playing, he became a head coach for the Los Angeles Kings in the team's run to the 1993 Stanley Cup Final. Until 2023, he was a long-time commentator and hockey analyst for ESPN as well as a contributor for the NHL Network.

== Hockey career ==
=== Playing career ===
1981 card of Melrose for the Toronto Maple Leafs

Melrose began his junior hockey career as a defenceman in the Saskatchewan Junior Hockey League with the Weyburn Red Wings for the 1973–74 season. He spent the next two seasons in the Western Hockey League with the Kamloops Chiefs.

He was selected in the second round (36th overall) of the 1976 NHL Amateur Draft by the Montreal Canadiens and in the fourth round (37th overall) the 1976 WHA Amateur Draft by the Cincinnati Stingers. He started the 1976–77 season with the Springfield Indians of the American Hockey League, before moving mid-season to the Cincinnati Stingers of the World Hockey Association (WHA), where he stayed until 1979.

Following the demise of the WHA and the subsequent absorption of some of its teams into the National Hockey League (NHL), Melrose joined the Winnipeg Jets for the 1979–80 season. Melrose made his NHL debut on October 10, 1979, getting an assist on a goal by Morris Lukowich in a 4-2 loss to the Pittsburgh Penguins.

For the remainder of his playing career, Melrose split time between the Toronto Maple Leafs and the Detroit Red Wings, as well as their assorted AHL affiliates. Melrose spent his final season playing with the Adirondack Red Wings of the AHL during the 1986–87 season.

During his NHL playing career, he played 300 games, scoring 10 goals, with 23 assists and 728 penalty minutes. He also played in 7 playoff games with the Maple Leafs, assisting on 2 goals and receiving 38 penalty minutes.

=== Coaching career ===
Upon his retirement from playing, Melrose immediately began coaching. He coached the 1987–88 season with the Medicine Hat Tigers of the Western Hockey League, leading them to a 44–22–6 record and a Memorial Cup title.

Melrose coached the next season with the Seattle Thunderbirds before jumping to the AHL and coaching the Adirondack Red Wings. He spent three years with the Red Wings, leading them to a Calder Cup win in the 1991–92 season.

For the 1992–93 season, the 35-year-old Melrose was hired to coach the NHL's Los Angeles Kings, leading them, without home-ice advantage in any round, to the 1993 Stanley Cup Final, which they lost to the Montreal Canadiens in five games. It was the franchise's first trip to the finals. Melrose's Kings missed the playoffs the next season and then he was fired with seven games remaining in the lockout-shortened 1994–95 season.

The Tampa Bay Lightning hired Melrose as their head coach in June 2008. On October 21, 2008, Melrose recorded his first win as a head coach in over 13 years in a 3–2 victory over the Atlanta Thrashers. On November 14, 2008, Melrose was fired by the Lightning when his first 16 games had produced a 5–7–4 record.

=== ESPN ===
Melrose joined ESPN as a guest analyst in the spring of 1994 and 1995 when the Kings missed the playoffs and permanently in the fall of 1995 as a color commentator and studio analyst alongside hosts John Buccigross and John Saunders. He left ESPN in June 2008 to coach the Tampa Bay Lightning. After his short stint with the Lightning ended, he returned to ESPN on January 1, 2009, in conjunction with the Winter Classic played between the Detroit Red Wings and Chicago Blackhawks. He was also the lead studio analyst on NHL 2Night together with Ray Ferraro along with host Buccigross. The trio also called some NHL games and the Frozen Four championship games together.

On October 10, 2023, John Buccigross, Melrose's longtime colleague at ESPN, announced on X that Melrose would be retiring from the network to spend more time with his family after being diagnosed with Parkinson's disease.

=== NHL Network ===
Melrose joined the NHL Network as a contributor in September 2011.

== Personal life ==
Born on July 15, 1956 in Kelvington, Saskatchewan, to Norrie and James Melrose, he grew up on a farm outside the town. He was the cousin of former NHL players Wendel Clark and Joe Kocur. He met his wife, Cindy, while playing in Cincinnati and married her in 1978; the couple had two sons. Melrose resided in Glens Falls, New York, and became a U.S. citizen in March 1998.

Melrose died on September 9, 2026, at the age of 70, due to complications from Parkinson's disease.

A banner carrying his name draped above logos for the Red Wings, the Adirondack IceHawks and the Adirondack Frostbite, was put on memorial display at Harding Mazzotti Arena ahead of the Adirondack Thunder season opener on October 18, with a ceremonial puck dropping ceremony performed by his grandson Cooper and his former broadcast partner Steve Levy.

== Career statistics ==
			Regular season					Playoffs
Season	Team	League	GP	G	A	Pts	PIM	GP	G	A	Pts	PIM
1973–74	Weyburn Red Wings	SJHL	50	2	19	21	162	—	—	—	—	—
1974–75	Kamloops Chiefs	WCHL	70	6	18	24	95	6	1	1	2	21
1975–76	Kamloops Chiefs	WCHL	72	12	49	61	112	12	4	6	10	14
1976–77	Cincinnati Stingers	WHA	29	1	4	5	8	2	0	0	0	0
1976–77	Springfield Indians	AHL	23	0	3	3	17	—	—	—	—	—
1977–78	Cincinnati Stingers	WHA	69	2	9	11	113	—	—	—	—	—
1978–79	Cincinnati Stingers	WHA	80	2	14	16	222	3	0	1	1	8
1979–80	Winnipeg Jets	NHL	74	4	6	10	124	—	—	—	—	—
1980–81	Winnipeg Jets	NHL	18	1	1	2	40	—	—	—	—	—
1980–81	Toronto Maple Leafs	NHL	57	2	5	7	166	3	0	1	1	15
1981–82	Toronto Maple Leafs	NHL	64	1	5	6	186	—	—	—	—	—
1982–83	Toronto Maple Leafs	NHL	52	2	5	7	68	4	0	1	1	23
1982–83	St. Catharines Saints	AHL	25	1	10	11	106	—	—	—	—	—
1983–84	Detroit Red Wings	NHL	21	0	1	1	74	—	—	—	—	—
1983–84	Adirondack Red Wings	AHL	16	2	1	3	37	—	—	—	—	—
1984–85	Adirondack Red Wings	AHL	72	3	13	16	226	—	—	—	—	—
1985–86	Detroit Red Wings	NHL	14	0	0	0	70	—	—	—	—	—
1985–86	Adirondack Red Wings	AHL	57	4	4	8	204	—	—	—	—	—
1986–87	Adirondack Red Wings	AHL	55	4	9	13	170	11	1	2	3	107
WHA totals			178	5	27	32	343	5	0	1	1	10
AHL totals			248	14	40	54	760	11	1	2	3	107
NHL totals			300	10	23	33	728	7	0	2	2	38

== Coaching record ==
Team	Year	Regular season							Postseason
Team	Year	G	W	L	T	OTL	Pts	Finish	Result
LAK	1992–93	84	39	35	10	—	88	3rd in Smythe	Lost in Stanley Cup Final (MTL)
LAK	1993–94	84	27	45	12	—	66	5th in Pacific	Missed playoffs
LAK	1994–95	41	13	21	7	—	(33)	(fired)	—
TBL	2008–09	16	5	7	—	4	(14)	(fired)	—
Total		225	84	108	29	4			1 playoff appearance

Sporting positions
Preceded by Tom Webster	Head coach of the Los Angeles Kings; 1992–1995	Succeeded by Rogatien Vachon
Preceded by John Tortorella	Head coach of the Tampa Bay Lightning; 2008	Succeeded by Rick Tocchet
