= David Lloyd (sportscaster) =

American sportscaster

- Education: Colgate University, '83; B.S., International Relations
- Occupation: TV Sports Anchor
- Title: SportsCenter Anchor
- Website: ESPN bio

David Lloyd is a sportscaster who worked for ESPN for nearly 30 years. He appeared on the Coast to Coast SportsCenter Monday through Friday with Cari Champion. Lloyd is a native of Westport, Connecticut. He has a bachelor's degree in international relations from Colgate University after graduating in 1983.

After an internship at WMAZ in Macon, Georgia, he anchored sportscasts at KTXL in Sacramento, California; WCIV in Charleston, South Carolina; and KGTV in San Diego, California. He joined ESPN in October 1997. Lloyd was laid off from ESPN in July 2026 as part of a mass layoff.
