= Steve Bunin =

American sport broadcaster

Steve Bunin (born in Seattle, Washington) is a former ESPN Anchor, a five-time Emmy Award winner and a 16-time Emmy nominee. He is now an Executive Communications Coach for companies around the world.

== Career ==
Bunin was a news anchor at KING-TV from 2017-2022. He earned Emmy nominations for Best News Anchor in each of his six years, the only anchor in the Northwest to be honored six consecutive times. (He won the award in 2021).

Bunin was an anchor at ESPN from 2003 to 2012, hosting a variety of shows, most frequently Outside The Lines, SportsCenter and College Football Live. He also hosted Baseball Tonight, NFL Live, Sports Reporters, ESPN Radio and numerous NCAA and pro sports events on ESPN and ESPN2. While at ESPN, Bunin won two Emmy Awards as part of the team on SportsCenter.

From 2012 to 2014, he was the lead anchor for Comcast SportsNet Houston before the network went bankrupt. Bunin was nominated for the Lonestar Emmy Award for Best Sports Anchor in both of his years at CSN, winning an Emmy in 2014 for his 60-minute interview special with Olympic legend Carl Lewis.

From 2015-2016, Bunin co-hosted sports radio talk shows on ESPN Radio KFNC Houston and SB Nation Radio with former NFL QB Sean Salisbury, with whom he also worked at ESPN.

Between 1995-2003, Bunin was a sports anchor at five local news stations: WTVH-TV in Syracuse, New York, where he worked alongside future ABC anchor David Muir, WICZ-TV in Binghamton, New York, KNAZ-TV in Flagstaff, Arizona, WLAJ-TV in Lansing, Michigan, and WOTV-TV in Battle Creek, Michigan. His painful journey to ESPN was documented in the Seattle Times in 2003.

Bunin is now an Executive Communications Coach. He is also the varsity boys basketball coach at Northwest Yeshiva High School in Seattle.

== Awards and honors ==
In addition to his five Emmys, Bunin won three Associated Press awards for sportscasting in 1998 (Arizona) and 2000 (Michigan).

In 2010, Bunin became the first anchor at ESPN to win the company’s prestigious “Game Ball” award for character. In 2012, he received the President's Volunteer Service Award from Barack Obama, for his volunteer efforts, primarily with at-risk teens.

In 2011, Sports Illustrated’s media critic Richard Deitsch called Bunin "one of the most underrated talents in sports journalism." In Sports Illustrated's 2011 Media Awards, Bunin was declared one of the "Twelve Broadcasters Viewers Deserve More Of In 2012."
