= List of SportsCenter anchors and reporters =

This is a list of current and former SportsCenter anchors and reporters since the television show debuted on September 7, 1979.

== SportsCenter anchors ==
=== Current SportsCenter anchors ===
- Cristina Alexander: (2022–present)
- Victoria Arlen: (2018–present)
- Matt Barrie: (2013–present)
- Chris Berman: (1979–present), occasional anchor
- John Brickley: (2020–present)
- Nicole Briscoe: (2015–present)
- John Buccigross: (1996–present)
- Stormy Buonantony: (2023–present)
- Madelyn Burke: (2026–present)
- Andraya Carter: (2023–present)
- Drew Carter: (2024–present)
- Kevin Connors: (2008–present)
- Shae Cornette: (2020–present)
- Courtney Cronin: (2026–present)
- Rece Davis: (1995–present), studio host with ESPN, still anchors SportsCenter on occasion
- Michael Eaves: (2016–present)
- Rich Eisen: (1996–2003 and 2025–present), also with NFL Network
- Katie Feeney: (2025–present, Snapchat)
- Tyler Fulgham (2024–present), also ESPN betting analyst
- Katie George: (2020–present)
- Jay Harris: (2003–present)
- Jen Lada: (2018–present)
- Alyssa Lang: (2019–present)
- Steve Levy: (1993–present), also a play-by-play commentator
- Keiana Martin: (2026–present)
- Molly McGrath: (2025–present)
- Taylor McGregor: (2026–present)
- Phil Murphy: (2024–present)
- Kevin Negandhi: (2008–present)
- Stephen Nelson: (2023–present)
- Karl Ravech: (1993–2026), also on Baseball Tonight
- Kelsey Riggs: (2020–present)
- Laura Rutledge: (2018–present)
- Treavor Scales: (2018–2021 and 2025–present)
- Randy Scott: (2012–present)
- Amina Smith (2024–present)
- Hannah Storm: (2008–present)
- Gary Striewski: (2018–present)
- Scott Van Pelt: (2001–present), based in Washington, D.C.
- Stan Verrett: (2000–2025 and 2026–present), also with NFL Network
- Sara Walsh: (2010–2017 and 2026–present), also with NFL Network
- Christine Williamson: (2022–present)

=== Former SportsCenter anchors ===
- John Anderson: (1999–2024)
- Jorge Andres: (2011–2015), formerly with American Sports Network, now with CBS Sports
- Larry Beil: (1996–1999), now sports director at KGO-TV (ABC) in San Francisco
- Steve Berthiaume: (2000–2006 and 2007–2012), now a play-by-play commentator for the Arizona Diamondbacks television broadcasts on Bally Sports Arizona
- Michelle Bonner: (2005–2012), now runs her own public relations and consulting group
- Tim Brando: (1986–1994), now with Fox Sports as a play-by-play commentator
- Max Bretos: (2010–2019) Left ESPN to join LAFC full time
- Ashley Brewer: (2020–2023), based in Los Angeles, now with NFL Network
- Cindy Brunson: (1999–2012), now with Bally Sports Arizona
- Steve Bunin: (2003–2012), was with Comcast SportsNet Houston (now AT&T SportsNet Southwest) until October 2014, now a morning news anchor at KING-TV
- Cara Capuano: (2000–2004), now with ESPNU
- Cari Champion: (2012–2020), now with Amazon Prime Video
- Cary Chow: (2017–2019), now at WRC-TV in Washington, D.C.
- Eric Clemons: (1987–1991), now freelancing
- Jonathan Coachman: (2009–2017)
- Antonietta Collins: (2016–2022)
- Kevin Corke: (1999–2003), now with Fox News
- Jay Crawford: (2012–2017), among the 100 staffers who were let go by ESPN on April 26, 2017; later an executive in residence at Bowling Green State University, now with WKYC (NBC) in Cleveland
- Lindsay Czarniak (2011–2017), now produces digital content and features for Joe Gibbs Racing; also serves as sideline reporter for NFL Network and contributor for Today.
- Elle Duncan: (2016–2025), now with Netflix
- Jack Edwards: (1991–2003), now a play-by-play announcer for the Boston Bruins on NESN
- Josh Elliott: (2006–2011), now with CBS News
- Neil Everett: (2000–2023), based in Los Angeles
- Dave Feldman: (1996–2000), now with NBC Sports Bay Area
- Robert Flores: (2007–2016), now with MLB Network and NHL Network
- Chris Fowler: (1989–1993), now a studio host for the network, including ESPN's College GameDay (1993–2014); he is also a lead play-by-play commentator for ESPN's college football coverage, including ABC's Saturday Night Football
- Kevin Frazier: (2002–2004), now with Entertainment Tonight
- Gayle Gardner: (1983–1988), retired from broadcasting
- Rhonda Glenn: (1981–1994); died in 2015
- George Grande: (1979–1988), former sports commentator for Cincinnati Reds television broadcasts on Fox Sports Ohio, now retired
- Mike Greenberg: (1996–2017), now co-host of Get Up! on ESPN
- Todd Grisham: (2011–2016), now a play-by-play commentator for the Ultimate Fighting Championship
- Greg Gumbel: (1979–1988), moved to CBS Sports; died in 2024
- Brett Haber: (1994–1997), now commentator for the Tennis Channel
- Mike Hall: (2004–2005), formerly with ESPNU from March 4, 2005, to April 27, 2007, now with Big Ten Network
- Chris Hassel: (2013–2017), among the 100 staffers who were let go by ESPN on April 26, 2017; now with CBS Sports
- Darren M. Haynes: (2014–2017), now with KCAL-TV in Los Angeles
- Fred Hickman: (2004–2008), formerly with WVUE-DT in New Orleans, Louisiana as a sports director for the station and later a news anchor at WDVM-TV in Hagerstown, Maryland; died in 2022
- Jemele Hill: (2017–2018), now with The Undefeated
- Mike Hill: (2008–2013), now with FS1
- Cassidy Hubbarth: (2012–2025), now with Amazon Prime
- Jason Jackson: (1995–2002), now a broadcaster for the Miami Heat
- Dana Jacobson: (2002–2006 and 2011–2012), now with CBS News and Sports.
- Brian Kenny: (1997–2011), now with MLB Network
- Nabil Karim: (2019–2022), now with Turner Sports
- Doug Kezirian: (2012–2023)
- Lisa Kerney: (2014–2018), now with FanDuel, NBC Sports and USA Sports
- Michael Kim: (1996–2013), now with Stadium
- Craig Kilborn: (1993–1996), later host of Comedy Central's The Daily Show from 1996 to 1998 and CBS's The Late Late Show from 1999 to 2004, now an actor
- Suzy Kolber: (1993–1996), (1999–2023), studio host for NFL Insiders and host of Monday Night Countdown, anchored SportsCenter on occasion
- Lee Leonard: (1979), was host of a public affairs program on the Comcast Network until that network folded in October 2017; died in 2018
- Bob Ley: (1979–2019), retired on June 30, 2019
- David Lloyd: (1998–2026)
- Sal Marchiano: (1979–1984), longtime New York area sportscaster, now retired
- Kenny Mayne: (1994–2021)
- Chris McKendry: (1996–2016), now an on-site host for ESPN's tennis coverage
- Jade McCarthy: (2012–2017)
- Tom Mees: (1979–1996) drowned in 1996
- Zubin Mehenti: (2011–2025)
- Gary Miller: (1990–2004), now an anchor at WKRC-TV in Cincinnati
- Chris Myers: (1987–1998), now with Fox Sports
- Katie Nolan: (2017–2018) (Snapchat edition)
- Dari Nowkhah: (2007–2011), now with SEC Network
- Arda Ocal: (2017–2018 and 2021–2026)
- Keith Olbermann: (1992–1997, 2013–2015 and 2018–2020)
- Bill Patrick: (1990–1998), now with NBC Sports and NBCSN
- Dan Patrick: (1989–2006), formerly co-hosted NBC's Football Night in America from 2008 to 2017, now a senior writer for Sports Illustrated and host of The Dan Patrick Show on Premiere Networks and Peacock
- Bill Pidto: (1993–2008)
- Samantha Ponder: (2019–2024)
- Molly Qerim: (2018–2025)
- Scott Reiss: (2001–2008), now with KRON-TV
- Dave Revsine: (1999–2007), now lead anchor of Big Ten Network
- Robin Roberts: (1990–2004), now co-anchor of ABC's Good Morning America
- Karie Ross: (1988–1990)
- Dianna Russini: (2015–2023)
- Stuart Scott: (1993–2014), died of cancer in 2015
- Will Selva: (2007–2011), now an anchor for NFL Network
- Bill Seward: (1984 and 1996–2000), now a sports anchor at NBC Sports and CBS Radio
- Jaymee Sire: (2013–2017), among the 100 staffers who were let go by ESPN on April 26, 2017; she is now with the Food Network
- Michael Smith: (2017–2018), now with NBC Sports and Amazon Prime Video
- Ryan Smith: (2019–2026)
- Michele Steele: (2011–2026)
- Sage Steele: (2007–2023)
- Charley Steiner: (1987–2001), now a play-by-play commentator for Los Angeles Dodgers radio broadcasts
- Bob Stevens: (1995–2002), started announcing Savannah State football games in 2006
- Mike Tirico: (1991–1997), was a play-by-play commentator for ESPN's Monday Night Football, NBA play-by-play commentator for ESPN and ESPN on ABC; Tirico is now with NBC Sports
- Adnan Virk: (2010–2019), terminated February 3, 2019; now with MLB Network
- Pam Ward: (1996–2004), now a college football and women's college basketball play-by-play commentator for ESPN
- Whit Watson: (1997–2002), now with Golf Channel
- Bram Weinstein: (2010–2015), now the radio play-by-play voice of the Washington Commanders
- Steve Weissman: (2010–2015), now with NFL Network and Tennis Channel
- Matt Winer: (2001–2010), now with Turner Sports and NBA TV
- Trey Wingo: (1997–2020)

=== Current SportsCenter reporters ===
- Chris Connelly: (2001–present) essayist
- Sal Paolantonio: (1995–present) Philadelphia and New York City-based bureau reporter; NFL reporter
- T. J. Quinn: (2007–present) investigative reporter and Outside the Lines fill-in host
- Lisa Salters: (2002–present) Los Angeles-based bureau reporter; Monday Night Football sideline reporter (since 2012)
- Jeremy Schaap: (1996–present) New York City-based bureau reporter, Outside the Lines host and E:60 co-host (since May 14, 2017)
- Joe Schad: (2005–present) college football reporter
- Adam Schefter: (2009–present) NFL reporter/insider
- Shelley Smith: (1993–present) Los Angeles-based bureau reporter
- Ed Werder: (1998–2017 and 2019–present), rejoined ESPN on August 12, 2019, as a Dallas-based bureau reporter; he was previously an NFL reporter for ESPN during his first stint with the network until he was laid off on April 26, 2017

=== Former SportsCenter reporters ===
- David Aldridge: (1996–2004), now a reporter for NBA on TNT and NBA TV
- David Amber: (2005–2010), now with Sportsnet
- Erin Andrews: (2004–2012), currently with Fox Sports
- Anne Marie Anderson: (2007), now with the Pac-12 Network
- Bonnie Bernstein: (1995–1998 and 2006–2009), now a co-host of The Michael Kay Show on WEPN in New York
- Jenn Brown: (2009–2012)
- John Clayton: (1995–2017), NFL reporter, died March 18, 2022.
- Colleen Dominguez: (2004–2014), Los Angeles-based bureau reporter
- Jeannine Edwards: (1995–2017), retired on December 29, 2017
- Alex Flanagan: (1998–2006), formerly a reporter for the NFL Network and NBC Sports, now with the Montag Group
- Peter Gammons: (1990–2009), MLB reporter for ESPN, now in same capacity for the MLB Network
- Hank Goldberg: (1993–2022) Miami-based bureau reporter; died on July 4, 2022
- Pedro Gomez: (2003–2021) West Coast based reporter; died on February 7, 2021
- Ann Kreiter (formerly Ann Werner): (1990–2000), now an anchor and studio host at BTN
- Andrea Kremer: (1990–2006), now with NFL Network
- Mark Malone: (1994–2004), now a football color commentator for Westwood One Radio Network
- Mike Massaro: (2001–2014), was with NBC Sports as a pit reporter for the network's NASCAR coverage until December 2016, he is now with MAVTV
- Chris Mortensen: (1991–2023) Atlanta-based bureau reporter; National Football League reporter; died on March 3, 2024
- Rachel Nichols: (2004–2013 and 2016–2022) NBA reporter, now with Monumental Sports Network
- Wendi Nix: (2006–2023) Boston-based bureau reporter; she is also one of the hosts of College Football Live, an in-studio contributor on Sunday NFL Countdown (since 2014) and anchors SportsCenter on occasion
- Pam Oliver: (1993–1995), now with Fox Sports
- Lou Palmer: (1979–1985); died on October 18, 2019
- Tom Rinaldi: (2003–2020) New York City-based bureau reporter; First Take fill-in co-host; now with Fox Sports
- Jimmy Roberts: (1988–2000), now with NBC Sports
- Shannon Spake: (2007–2016), now with Fox Sports
- Melissa Stark: (1999–2003), now a sideline reporter for NBC Sunday Night Football, had worked concurrently with NBC Sports and NFL Network until April 2024, when she was laid off from the latter
- Michele Tafoya: (2000–2011), was most recently with NBC Sports

== See also ==
- List of SportsCenter segments and specials
