= List of SportsCenter segments and specials =

This is a list of current and former SportsCenter segments seen since that show debuted on September 7, 1979.

== Segments ==
=== Current ===
==== In-show ====
===== B =====
- Barry's Best – Former NHL coach Barry Melrose picks his top hockey highlights of the night which are divided into the top goals, saves, and hits. This segment returned in 2009, when Melrose rejoined ESPN. This was ended when Melrose retired from the network in 2023.
- Baseball Tonight Extra – A segment showing highlights of Major League Baseball games currently in progress at the time of a given SportsCenter broadcast. The highlights that are shown are presented by the evening's host and analyst of Baseball Tonight. This segment was discontinued after the 2013 MLB season.
- Break Down – A nightly segment in which an analyst breaks down a certain key game in the world of sports; the segment is sponsored by McDonald's.
- By the Numbers – A segment featuring numerical stats (for example, 27 – the number of World Series championships won by the New York Yankees).

===== C =====
- Call of the Day – Often seen during the "Top Ten" segment, this features a call from a play-by-play and/or color commentator from a radio and/or television sports broadcast benefiting from the day's sports highlight.
- Chevy Clubhouse (formerly Diamond Cutters) – A segment in which baseball analysts are asked questions involving baseball, similar to "Coors Light Cold Hard Facts" and "Gatorade Cooler Talk." This segment, which is sponsored by Chevrolet, is seen during the baseball season.
- Chris Berman's 2-Minute Drill – In this weekly segment, which airs on Fridays during the NFL season, Berman previews the week's top NFL matchups, and takes his picks from that week's key games (for example, the St. Louis Rams and the Miami Dolphins). "Swami Slate" (Berman's records for the week and season) and "Swami Sez" (Berman's game picks) are usually seen towards the end of the segment.
- Closing Number – This segment, which is seen at the end of the 6:00 p.m. ET editions, shows a particular statistic – the day's "closing number" (for example: 19,921, the number of SportsCenter broadcasts from Studio A of the ESPN studios (where the program was produced from 1994 to 2004, before it moved to the Digital Center on June 7, 2004)).
- Contender or Pretender – Usually an analyst(s) will debate whether a team can contend for a pennant, division, or championship.
- Coors Light Cold Hard Facts – A series of six questions directed to an analyst on a certain sport.
- Credits Roll – Traditionally airs after the Christmas Eve 11 p.m. broadcast or thereabouts; a complete closing credits package featuring the names of all 7,000+ employees in each ESPN division worldwide set to Christmas carols customized to feature accents from the SportsCenter theme and This is SportsCenter ads (the This is SportsCenter ads were replaced by memorable sports moments from the past year due to ESPN replacing This is SportsCenter with "My Life, My Team" in 2024). The 2011 version filled an entire half-hour timeslot.
- Cup of Joe –

===== D =====
- Did You Know? – At the end of each show, an interesting and usually hardly known fact would be presented regarding a major issue in the sports headlines that day. This segment is now seen during (but not at the end of) the program on occasion.
- Dilfer's Dimes – After every week of NFL football play, this segment was presented by Trent Dilfer, in which he analyzed the best quarterback throws for that week. This segment was discontinued following the 2016 NFL season.
- Doin' Too Much – this segment, which debuted February 6, 2017 on the revamped 6:00 p.m. ET edition of SportsCenter and was carried over from their former show, His & Hers, co-presenters Michael Smith and Jemele Hill count down the day's moments in which people are "Doin' Too Much." The segment was discontinued after Hill's departure from the show and also, after the final SC6 show aired on February 2, 2018.

===== E =====
- ESPN Deportes Update – An ESPN Deportes personality provides highlights of sporting events outside of the United States. This segment is seen during the late editions of SportsCenter.

===== F =====
- Fact or Fiction – Usually an analyst(s) will debate whether something is plausible or not (for example, Sammy Sosa will make the Hall of Fame).
- Film Session – Seen on Mondays during the NFL season, with ESPN NFL analyst Merrill Hoge.
- Football Fix – A segment that focuses on all of the day's news in either college football or the NFL.; seen during the football season.
- Friday Funnies – A segment shown on Fridays at the end of the overnight editions in which the three funniest plays from the week's sporting events are shown. This segment is sponsored by GEICO.

===== G =====
- Game Count – This segment, which was very similar in concept to "Closing Number," shows the number of games a certain player or team has played in entering that day; it was seen on the 6 p.m. ET editions until it was discontinued sometime in 2009.
- Gatorade Cooler Talk – Seen on SportsCenter and during ESPN telecasts of NBA games, reporters of various sports are asked questions involving certain news stories; this segment is similar to "Coors Light Cold Hard Facts" and "Chevy Clubhouse."
- GMC Postgame – Suzy Kolber and Steve Young recap the night's Monday Night Football game, along with highlights and analysis from the site of that night's game.
- Good Call, Bad Call – A segment seen on Tuesdays during the college football season, with ESPN college football analyst Kirk Herbstreit; this segment is sponsored by Miller Lite.

===== H =====
- Hammerin' Hank – This segment features Hank Goldberg providing his picks for the week's upcoming NFL games; it is seen on Sunday mornings during the NFL season.
- Hard in the Paint – This segment, which debuted February 6, 2017 on the premiere edition of SC6, displayed moments where athletes were going "hard in the paint," or doing a lot at one moment. Like the aforementioned "Doin' Too Much" segment, this too, was discontinued after February 2, 2018.
- Hardly the Usual Top Ten (formerly the Not Top Ten) – This segment features the 10 worst plays of the week in sports (the opposite of the "Top Ten"). However, this had been retitled "Hardly the Usual Top Ten" in later weeks, due to sponsorship from Mike's Hard Lemonade. In that case, some of the plays featured could be good as well as bad. In either case, the background music seen in the segment was much more goofier than the normally upbeat background music in a standard Top Ten. This segment was discontinued in 2007, but returned in 2009 as a Friday segment (see "Not Top Ten" further down this page).
- Hummer Press Pass – This segment, first introduced in the spring of 2007, gave viewers an all-access pass to a certain school preparing for the upcoming college football season. This segment also focused on a variety of different subjects, such as the MLB trade deadline winners and losers. This segment was discontinued in 2009.

===== I =====
- Inside the Huddle – This segment is hosted by NFL insider John Clayton, in which he provides updates on the news and notes from around the league. It was formerly hosted by Chris Mortensen.
- "I Love Week ____" – This segment, which was seen towards the end of the Sunday night edition of SportsCenter through the NFL season, was a barrage of thinly related football highlights linked together with awkwardly worded lyrics to the tune of the short-lived Coors Light commercials which were related to that week's action (the trademark line "...and twins!" was also featured in these highlight songs). This segment was discontinued after the 2005 NFL season and was replaced by the "NFL Blitz" segment, which in turn, debuted in the first week of the 2006 NFL season on September 10 of that year.

===== K =====
- Keys to Victory – Seen on Mondays after Monday Night Football during the NFL season, Sean Salisbury joins the show for post-game analysis. This segment, which is sponsored by GMC, ends with the Keys to Victory poll.
- King of the Night – Presented "your way" by Burger King; this segment is seen on Tuesdays.
- Kiss It Goodbye - This segment showcases MLB players hitting home runs. If there are many home runs that day, it usually shows the ones which go further.

===== M =====
- Midweek Exam – Seen on Wednesdays during the football season (from September to December) with ESPN NFL analyst Merrill Hoge.
- Miller Lite Countdown to Kickoff – Seen towards the end of SportsCenter Monday Kickoff with ESPN NFL analyst and former Chicago Bears head coach Mike Ditka. This segment was discontinued at the end of 2012.

===== N =====
- "NASCAR Now" Pit Pass – News from the day in NASCAR, presented by the evening's host and analysts of NASCAR Now. This segment was seen during the NASCAR (Nationwide Series and Sprint Cup Series) season until the network's contract with NASCAR ended in 2014.
- NFL Blitz – Airing on the Sunday 11:00 p.m. ET editions during the NFL season, Chris Berman and Tom Jackson present clips of some of the NFL games from that day, with Boomer Esiason and T.J. giving their analysis of the game, similar to NFL Primetime. The segment is sponsored by Nike.
- NFL Field Pass – In this weekly segment, which airs on Thursdays and Fridays during the NFL season, the league's top games for the weekend are previewed. Contributors for this segment include John Clayton, Ron Jaworski, Mark Schlereth, and Sean Salisbury.
- NFL Quick Hits – A segment featuring daily headlines from around the league; it is seen during the NFL season.
- Not Top Ten – Revived in 2009 as a weekly segment, this is a Friday segment that takes a look at the 10 worst plays of the day, week, month or year in sports (the opposite of the "Top Ten"). The goofy background music is played during this segment, much like its aforementioned predecessor, "Hardly the Usual Top Ten."

===== O =====
- Off The Top Rope – Hosted mostly by then-former WWE employee Jonathan Coachman but sometimes by other former WWE employees Todd Grisham (who left ESPN at the end of 2016) and Max Bretos when Coachman is out or on an assignment. The segment aired on Wednesday night. It featured highlights of Monday Night RAW, SmackDown Live, and pay-per-view events. The segment also featured an interview with a current or former WWE wrestler. The segment was discontinued following Coachman's departure from ESPN in October 2017.
- One Big Thing – This segment, which appears in SportsCenter with Scott Van Pelt, features Van Pelt talking about his "one big thing" from the previous day in sports. This is usually a story line which will be a large part of the show.

===== P =====
- PTI's Big Finish: Pardon the Interruption hosts Tony Kornheiser and Michael Wilbon (both of whom are referred to by the anchors as the "PTI Guys") debate one sports topic, followed by the "Big Finish." This segment, which debuted in the summer of 2005, is seen only on the 6 p.m. ET edition of SportsCenter every weeknight (except when PTI is pre-empted by other programming, such as golf). "PTI's Big Finish" was discontinued in 2011, when PTI reverted to its original format.
- PTI Debate: Kornheiser and Wilbon debate one sports topic for 60 seconds. This segment, which replaced the aforementioned "PTI Big Finish" segment in 2011, was discontinued in 2016, but returned two years later (2018, when the 6pm ET SportsCenter returned to its previous format following the failed SC6 experiment in 2017).
- Pump Up The Volume: A segment in which certain sports highlights are shown, along with the radio call from the play-by-play announcers of the team benefiting from the highlight (such as a touchdown pass, field goal block, etc.).

===== Q =====
- Question of the Night – A segment in which the night's poll question, along with the choices, are seen on both SportsCenter and ESPN.com (for example, "Who do you think Ohio State's opponent will be in the BCS title game? A. Michigan; B. Notre Dame; C. USC; D. Florida"). Results of the poll question are shown either at the end of the show or at the end of the following night's show.

===== R =====
- Road Coverage – This segment, which was sponsored by State Farm and was seen during the NASCAR season, featured a recap of the day's NASCAR Nationwide or Sprint Cup Series race and analysis. This segment was discontinued in 2009.

===== S =====
- Spanning the Globe – A reporter or anchor stands in front of a graphic containing a map of the world and narrates segments on different sports issues transpiring throughout the U.S., as well as the rest of the world. The segment, which generally appears on Sundays, was originally hosted by ESPN Radio's Colin Cowherd (now with Fox Sports).
- SportsCenter Express – A brief video recap of sports highlights from the day or night before.
- SportsCenter Home Video – This occasional segment, which debuted in the summer of 2006, features home video footage of a sports highlight (such as a last-second shot at the buzzer in a high school basketball game). The anchor then talks to one of the people who appeared in that home video highlight.
- SportsCenter Reset – A segment in which the anchors reprise the day's and night's top stories.
- SportsCenter Right Now – A brief summary of the day's and night's top sports stories; also seen outside of the program.
- Star of the Night – Similar to the "Three Stars" in ice hockey, both anchors of the 12 a.m. edition name their "Star of the Night" from the day's sporting events; they may be an athlete or team who had extraordinary in-game performance, reached a milestone, or had an off-field achievement. The anchors often choose an athlete from a sport not usually covered, such as mid-major college athletics or sports with smaller popularity. At the end of the show, a Twitter user is chosen to award America's "Star of the Night".
- Stock Up, Stock Down – Debuting on August 11, 2008, this segment seen during the daytime editions of SportsCenter looks at the day's and/or week's (or weekend's) highs and lows of a certain sports star and/or team (for example: "Stock Up: Redeem Team's gold medal win at the 2008 Summer Olympics; Stock Down: Washington Nationals' 12-game losing streak").
- Sunday Conversation: An interview with a newsmaker. This segment is seen on the 11 p.m. broadcast on Sunday nights.

===== T =====
- Take Your Pick – Usually an analyst(s) will pick who will win a regular season game, or a postseason game or series, similar to "Fact or Fiction" and "Contender or Pretender."
- The Bracket – An occasional segment where the Sklar Brothers debate a number of things and decide the "winner".
- The Buzz/Morning Buzz – Debuting on August 11, 2008, this segment seen at the start of the daytime editions of SportsCenter, features a brief summary of the day's top sports stories.
- The Highlight - Seen at the beginning of the 9:00 a.m. ET editions, this segment shows full highlights from a specific sporting event from the previous day (or night).
- The Rush/Morning Rush –
- The Vent – The segment, which debuted on July 11, 2006, features a sportswriter who reacts to the results of several poll questions on ESPN.com.
- The Week that Was – A segment seen on Sundays, which rebroadcasts clips seen on the ESPN family of networks from the past week.
- Top Ten (a.k.a. Top Plays) – The 10 best plays of the day, week, month, or year in sports.
- Top Stories from ESPN.com – This segment, which is seen towards the end of the 6 p.m. edition, features the top sports news stories of the day from ESPN.com. This is also similar to Top Ten.

===== U =====
- Ultimate Highlight – A weekly segment that showed a montage of sports highlights from the past week, accompanied by a song from various musical artists or groups (such as Linkin Park, The Black Eyed Peas and Papa Roach). This segment (discontinued in 2009), which was sponsored by Gatorade, was seen on the 11:00 p.m. ET SportsCenter broadcast on Sunday nights.

===== V =====
- Victory Lane – This weekly segment was hosted by NASCAR insider Mike Massaro, in which he recapped all off the happening following the previous race on Sunday. This segment was discontinued at the end of 2014; Massaro left ESPN after that year to rejoin NBC Sports for its NASCAR coverage beginning in 2015.

===== W =====
- What 2 Watch 4 – The final segment of most shows, which promotes broadcasts of key games or events either later in the day or in the coming days, many on ESPN. This is usually shown at the end of the program, after the last commercial break.
- Who Said That? – A quotation usually said by either a past or present professional athlete or manager about a current situation or story in the sporting world. The quote is usually shown before a commercial break, where the speaker is often unknown. The reveal of the person who said the quote is revealed after the commercial break.
- Word on the Street –

==== Out of show ====
- SportsCenter 30 at 30: This is a short segment that appears for 30 seconds every 30 minutes in primetime from 7 to 11 p.m. ET. The anchor of this segment, which varies, delivers three big news stories and sometimes a highlight. Anchors of 30 at 30 have included John Buccigross and Matt Winer.
- SportsCenter In-Game: This segment appears during a live game telecast, when the studio host provides up to the minute highlights of an ongoing game, when someone scores or when something of importance happens.
- SportsCenter Minute: This is a short segment, very similar to "SportsCenter 30 at 30" (as shown above), that appears during a game being broadcast on ABC. The current presenting sponsor for the SportsCenter Minute is Vizio.
- SportsCenter Right Now: This is a minute-long update on the hour during the afternoon that is hosted by one of the anchors of the upcoming SportsCenter. This segment is also seen during the program.

=== Former ===
- 4 Downs – A segment featuring "The Professor" John Clayton going head-to-head with quarterback Sean Salisbury on four different topics once a week during the football season.
- Bud Light Freeze Frame – A segment seen on Wednesdays, in which images (still photos) from the past week are shown, followed by an ESPN.com poll question and viewer e-mails about the week's images.
- Budweiser Hot Seat – A figure (sports or non-sports) will be interviewed usually out-of-studio, in which they are asked to take sides on issues, teams, etc.
- Bumps, Bites and Bruises – A former segment (seen during the early 1990s) shown only on Mondays, highlighting the most vicious tackles and plays from that week's NFL games.
- Nick Bakay's Tale of the Tape - This segment, which aired occasionally, featured actor and writer Nick Bakay pits together both sides of a sports issue in a comedic tale of the tape. The issue would feature a category. Then both sides get weighed, and then an advantage is issued in that category. Bakay then ends the segment by announcing a "winner" and claiming it was done scientifically. This was also a column on ESPN.com's "Page 2." An example of Tale of the Tape.
- Open Mike – In this segment, which appeared early in the week during the NFL season, ESPN NFL analyst and former Chicago Bears head coach Mike Ditka and former Dallas Cowboys wide receiver Michael Irvin gave their respective takes on the NFL games from the past week. This segment was discontinued in 2008.

==== Special SportsCenter segments ====
These are the special SportsCenter segments that have aired over the years (in chronological order):

- SportsCenter Old School ran from August 8 to August 12, 2004 to celebrate the program's and ESPN's 25th anniversary and paired former SportsCenter hosts Craig Kilborn, Charley Steiner, Gayle Gardner, Greg Gumbel, and George Grande with current anchors Dan Patrick, Bob Ley, Stuart Scott, and Chris Berman. The show's graphics resembled those that appeared on ESPN in the early 1980s.
- 50 States in 50 Days aired on SportsCenter from July 17 to September 5, 2005. Each day for 50 consecutive days, the program, also called "SportsCenter Across America", visited every American state and the District of Columbia, covering various sporting events from the grassroots to the big leagues. The purpose of "50 States in 50 Days" was to "celebrate the uniqueness of each of our 50 states". The segment featuring Louisiana aired only once because it was scheduled for around the same time that Hurricane Katrina made landfall in the state. The song, Open Road by Bryan Adams, was used as the theme song. "50 States in 50 Days" did return for its 20th anniversary on June 27, 2025.
- My Wish is an annual week-long series of episodes on ESPN, usually in late June and/or early July. The first series aired on SportsCenter from July 9 to July 20, 2006 and ran through 10 episodes over two weeks. These features focused on children with various illnesses that have their sports dreams fulfilled in conjunction with the Make-A-Wish Foundation. ESPN co-parent The Walt Disney Company made a large donation to the foundation to help pay for the logistics of the segments. The children wrote about their experiences for ESPN.com. A full recap of the 2006 My Wish series aired on the 6 p.m. ET edition of SportsCenter on July 27, 2006. My Wish returned with five new segments that aired from June 24 to June 28, 2007, again in conjunction with the Make-A-Wish Foundation. A full recap of the 2007 My Wish series aired on the 6 p.m. ET edition of SportsCenter on the following day. The 2008 My Wish series aired from June 29 to July 3, 2008, with a full recap aired on July 4. The 2009 My Wish series aired from July 5 to July 10, 2009. There was no "My Wish" series in 2011, but the series returned in 2012. The song, My Wish by Rascal Flatts, is used as the theme song.
- ESPN the Weekend was an annual series of episodes on ESPN, usually in March. There were usually nine episodes during their time at the Walt Disney World theme park, two on Friday, three on Saturday, and four on Sunday. Various anchors appeared on location at Disney World, while others remained at the network's Bristol, Connecticut and LA Live studios. This segment has since been discontinued.
- Who's Now was a daily series that aired throughout July 2007, in which fans and ESPN.com users helped SportsCenter determine the ultimate sports star by considering both on-field success and off-field buzz. Based on fan nominations, ESPN Research selected the 32 finalists, who then squared off in a single-elimination bracket. The segments began airing on July 1, 2007 concluding with the final results of Who's Now, which were announced on the August 5, 2007 editions of SportsCenter. Tiger Woods was selected as the winner of Who's Now, receiving 65.1% of the fans' vote. LeBron James, who was the runner-up, received 34.9% of the fans' vote. The song, Big Things Poppin' by T.I., was used as the theme song.
- The Mitchell Report was released at 2 p.m. ET on December 13, 2007 during this SportsCenter Special, which was anchored by Karl Ravech and Bob Ley. This special broadcast ran for six hours, from 1-7 p.m. ET. The early evening edition of SportsCenter (anchored by Chris McKendry and Brian Kenny), which aired an hour later than usual at 7 p.m. ET, picked up that lead story.
- The Greatest Highlight with Chris Berman was a daily series that aired throughout February 2008, in which fans and ESPN.com users helped SportsCenter determine the greatest sports highlight of all time. Based on fan nominations, ESPN Research selected the 16 greatest sports highlights of all time, which then squared off in a single-elimination bracket. The final results of The Greatest Highlight were announced by segment host Chris Berman on March 2, 2008. The 1980 U.S. Olympic Hockey Team's "Miracle on Ice" was selected as The Greatest Highlight, receiving 59% of the votes. The Boise State Broncos' Statue of Liberty play in their 43-42 overtime win over the Oklahoma Sooners in the 2007 Fiesta Bowl, which was the runner up, received 41% of the fans' votes. This segment was very similar to 2007's Who's Now segment.
- TitleTown USA was a month-long segment that aired throughout July 2008. This series began airing on July 4 and ended on July 7, 2008. SportsCenter visited 20 finalist cities during the month. Based on online fan voting, Valdosta, Georgia was the winning city of "TitleTown USA". This segment was very similar to 2005's 50 States in 50 Days segment. Switchfoot's song "This Is Home", from The Chronicles of Narnia: Prince Caspian movie soundtrack, was the theme song used for the TitleTown USA segment, which was sponsored by Verizon Wireless, Wendy's and Dick's Sporting Goods.
- Mt. Rushmore of Sports was a month-long segment that aired throughout February 2009.
- Fan Feast was a segment that aired throughout July 2009. This segment was hosted by Mike Greenberg and Kenny Mayne.
- 30th Anniversary SportsCenter was a special edition of SportsCenter that aired September 6, 2009, one day before ESPN's 30th anniversary (September 7, 2009). Anchored by Chris Berman, Bob Ley and John Saunders, this show took a look at clips from the last 30 years in sports during the ESPN era, which was mixed in with news and highlights from the day in sports. This edition also celebrated the 30th anniversary of SportsCenter and ESPN.
- Honoring America's Heroes is the network's annual salute to the United States military, seen during the Veterans Day holiday. In addition to video tributes and features, SportsCenter aired live from the USS Carl Vinson in San Diego in 2011 and from Ramstein Air Base in Germany in 2012. On each occasion, a college basketball game followed: Michigan State and North Carolina on November 11, 2011 and MSU and Connecticut on November 9, 2012, both from the respective locations. In 2012, ESPN ran a scroll with the names of current employers who had served in the military. USAA is a sponsor of this segment. SportsCenter aired live from the United States Naval Academy in Annapolis, MD on November 8, 2013. On November 10, 2017, SportsCenter:AM was live on location in Parris Island, SC with Randy Scott, Sage Steele & Jay Harris as anchors.

== Other special editions of SportsCenter ==
- SportsCenter Monday Kickoff was seen on Mondays during the NFL season from 2006-2013, and ran for 16 weeks. It featured highlights and analysis of NFL games from the day before, previewed the night's Monday Night Football matchups, and all of the day's other sports news. The presenting sponsors for SportsCenter Monday Kickoff were Miller Lite and Coors Light. On September 17, 2012, SportsCenter Monday Kickoff had its runtime cut in half, from 60 minutes to 30 minutes only, due to Monday Night Countdown being moved up to the 6:30 p.m. ET timeslot. Chris Berman anchored SportsCenter Monday Kickoff during the 2013 NFL season. SportsCenter Monday Kickoff did not return for the 2014 season, due to Monday Night Countdown being moved up to the 6:00 p.m. ET time slot on ESPN and also, the 6:00 p.m. ET edition of SportsCenter being moved to ESPN2 on Mondays during the league's regular season.
- The Year in Review of SportsCenter (a.k.a. The Best of SportsCenter) is seen annually during the month of December, featuring a look back at the past year in sports, including highlights of the top games of the year (such as the 2006 Rose Bowl), as well as the top news stories of the year. This program is also available on DVD; the 2006 version was sold exclusively at Walmart.
- SportsCenter's Top Ten Games of the Year is also seen annually during the month of December, featuring a look back at the calendar year's top ten games, such as the World Series, the Super Bowl, the NBA Finals, and the NCAA men's and women's basketball championships.

== Vignettes ==
- SportsCentury, which later became a documentary series on ESPN Classic, began as a multimedia series in 1998. These included one-minute sponsored vignettes tying significant sports events to the day they occurred. This ran through February 14, 2000.
- SportsCenter In 2004, ESPN contributed to the ESPN25 project by counting down the 100 most significant sports events and news stories of the previous 25 years.
- In 2007, ESPN aired "Ultimate NASCAR", a series of one-minute features of significant events in the history of NASCAR. It celebrated the return of coverage rights to the network. These vignettes were rebroadcast through July 29, 2007, when ESPN aired the Allstate 400 at the Brickyard. That race was also the network's first NASCAR Sprint Cup telecast since the Atlanta fall race in November 2000 (when the Sprint Cup Series was then known as the Winston Cup Series).
- "After Jackie" was a series of vignettes that honored the role sports has played in the struggle for civil rights in the United States. These one-minute pieces premiered on March 25, 2007 and aired until April 15 of that year, 60 years to the day of Jackie Robinson's debut as the first African American player in Major League Baseball. This series also led up to the Jackie Robinson commemorative baseball game that night between the San Diego Padres and Los Angeles Dodgers. Between April 3 and 4, 2007, the series was sponsored by Suzuki.
- At the end of the network's final SportsCenter of 1999 (December 31, 1999), ESPN played a special seven-minute video called "Images of the Century" (commonly referred to on various video sites as "ESPN SportsCentury" or similar variants) that recalled some of the most memorable images, plays, athletes, and calls of the previous century of sports. The song used for the video was Dream On by Aerosmith.
- "Remembering the House that Ruth Built" was a series of vignettes featuring significant events in the history of Yankee Stadium, the home of Major League Baseball's New York Yankees. The 2008 season was also the ballclub's last at Yankee Stadium, which opened in 1923. These 30-second pieces, narrated by Baseball Tonight host and SportsCenter anchor Karl Ravech, originally aired on the ESPN family of networks in March 2008. This series was sponsored by Bank of America.

== See also ==
- SportsCenter
- Pardon the Interruption
- List of SportsCenter anchors and reporters
- 50 States in 50 Days
