= Chet Simmons =

American television executive

- Born: Chester Robert Simmons; July 11, 1928; New York City, New York, U.S.
- Died: March 25, 2010 (aged 81); Atlanta, Georgia, U.S.
- Occupation: Sports Television Executive
- Years active: 1952–2010
- Known for: ESPN; United States Football League; NBC Sports; ABC Sports; Sports Programs Inc. Dancer Fitzgerald

Chester Robert Simmons (July 11, 1928 – March 25, 2010) was an American television executive. He worked at ABC Sports, NBC Sports, and ESPN, and was the first commissioner of the USFL. From 1957 to 1964, he helped build ABC Sports into a leader in sports programming and was a key part of the development of Wide World of Sports. He joined NBC Sports in 1964, where he stayed for 15 years, becoming the network's first president in 1977. At NBC, he pioneered instant replay and coverage of the Olympics and NCAA Men's Basketball Final Four. In 1979, he left NBC to join the soon to launch ESPN, becoming its second president. At ESPN, he oversaw the launch of the network, the development of SportsCenter, the first broadcasts of the NFL draft, coverage of the early rounds of the NCAA Men's Basketball Final Four and the development of Chris Berman, Bob Ley, George Grande, Greg Gumbel, and Dick Vitale. In 1982, he became the first commissioner of the United States Football League and led it through three championships and players including Herschel Walker, Jim Kelly, Reggie White, Steve Young, and Anthony Carter.

He is the 2005 recipient of the Sports Emmy Lifetime Achievement Award and a member of the University of Alabama College of Communications and Information Sciences Hall of Fame. He was inducted into the Sports Broadcasting Hall of Fame in 2010.

== Early life and education ==
Born in New York City on July 11, 1928, Simmons was raised in Ossining, New York, and Pawtucket, Rhode Island. His father, Leonard Simmons, a Polish immigrant, manufactured women's house dresses. His mother, Rose "Kitty" Suffin, was a first-generation American. Chet went to West High School in Pawtucket where he played baseball, football, and cards. His love for sports began when he was a child listening to Brooklyn Dodgers games on the family car's radio. After high school, he first attended George Washington University but later transferred to the University of Alabama where he graduated with a bachelor's degree in broadcasting in 1950. He went on to receive a Master of Science in television from Boston University. While in college, Simmons became a brother of Alpha Epsilon Pi. He served in the United States Coast Guard after completing his graduate studies. While in the Coast Guard, he was stationed in Cape May and was the sports editor of the Coast Guard's Newspaper. Following his Coast Guard assignment, he started his media career in NYC at advertising agency Dancer Fitzgerald Sample.

== Career ==
Simmons counted Mel Allen, Vin Scully, Tony Kubek, Joe Gargiola, Jack Buck, Greg Gumble and Chris Schenkel as broadcasting influences.

In 1957, while working at the ad agency Dancer Fitzgerald Sample, Simmons accepted an invitation from Edgar Scherick to join Sports Programs Inc., which would evolve into ABC Sports four years later. Along with Sherick and Roone Arledge, Simmons help pioneer ABC Sports to become the leader in Sports Television in the United States with the creation of Wide World of Sports and full coverage of the Olympics. While at ABC Sports, he became vice president and general manager of programing. Called by colleague Roone Arledge "the sanest of my office mates", Simmons played a major role in laying the groundwork for helping ABC to carve its own niche in the world of network sports.

In 1964, Simmons moved over to NBC Sports first as Director of Programming and moving up in 1977 to become the first President of NBC Sports. During his 15-year career at NBC, Simmons was instrumental in the creation of "instant replay" and securing major sports properties, including the American Football League, National Football League, Major League Baseball, National Hockey League, NCAA basketball, the Rose and Orange Bowls, Wimbledon and the 1972 and 1980 Olympics (although the 1980 Olympics were boycotted by the United States and NBC's coverage was significantly reduced).

Slightly more than five weeks prior to ESPN's official launch on September 7, 1979, Simmons joined as President bringing along fellow NBC Sports executive and long time friend Scotty Connal to head production and operations. Leaving the prestige and comfort of NBC Sports was natural for Simmons and Connal who strongly believed in the idea of a 24-hour sports network. However, at the time cable and satellite channels were just in their infancy with HBO launching in 1975 and CNN yet to go on the air. Simmons and Connal and the young ESPN team got the network up on time launching with the first SportsCenter hosted by George Grande and Lee Leonard followed by a slow-pitch softball game. Together, Simmons and Connal led the company through its infancy building a first class operation in Bristol, Connecticut. During his three years, Simmons gave start to some of ESPNs most important franchises including SportsCenter, The NFL Draft and full coverage of the early rounds of the NCAA Men's Basketball Tournament. Additionally, he is credited for the hiring of Chris Berman, Bob Ley, Greg Gumbel, Bryant Gumbel, George Grande, and many others. He left ESPN to become Commissioner of the USFL in 1982.

George Bodenheimer, co-chairman of Disney Media Networks/president of ESPN, says that Simmons, working closely with Scotty Connal, shaped ESPN into something that was real and connected with sports fans. Simmons also forged a culture that is still ESPN's defining advantage in the marketplace, according to Bodenheimer. "He treated everyone like a colleague," says Bodenheimer, who was a driver in the mailroom at the time. "And you had these two icons from the broadcast-sports industry who moved to a funny cable startup and got the best out of everybody."

In July 2014, Forbes magazine named Simmons as one of 7 CEOs Who Took A Gamble and Scored. Included in the list are Bill Gates (Microsoft), Larry Page (Google), Steve Jobs (Apple), Larry Ellison (Oracle), Fred Smith (FedEx) and Karen Kaplan (Hill Holiday). "He left his stable position at NBC Sports in 1979 to become president of a new cable sports network dubbed ESPN. In his three years there, he turned the upstart 24-hour sports network into a powerhouse in the TV industry."

During Simmons time at ABC, NBC and ESPN, he helped discover, launch and develop the careers of some of the top announcers in Sports including Jim Simpson, Merlin Olsen, Jim McKay, Chris Schenkel, Greg Gumbel, Bryant Gumbel, Dick Enberg, Curt Gowdy, Tony Kubek, Joe Garagiola, Sandy Koufax, Vin Scully, Bud Collins, Donna de Varona, Bucky Waters, George Grande, Chris Berman, Bob Ley, Tom Mees, Dick Vitale, Cliff Drysdale, Sharon Smith, Tim Ryan, Marv Albert, and Jack Buck.

=== United States Football League (USFL) ===
In June 1982, Simmons was appointed the first Commissioner of the United States Football League a month after its formation. The spring and summer time professional football league was founded by David Dixon, a New Orleans entrepreneur. The League, headquartered in New York, launched with 12 teams in Philadelphia, Tampa, Washington, D.C., Birmingham, Oakland, Boston, Chicago, Denver, Michigan, Arizona Los Angeles, and New Jersey/New York. Owners included Myles Tannebaum, John F. Bassett, Alfred Taubman, J. Walter Duncan, and Bill Daniels. With Simmons success with the NFL Draft on ESPN, the League's first draft was held in NYC on January 4, 1983 where the Los Angeles Express selected quarterback Dan Marino of the University of Pittsburgh. Marino chose to pass on the Express and signed with the Miami Dolphins of the NFL who chose him 27th in the 1st Round. Understanding the importance of big name players and coaches, the owners with Simmons and his top deputy Steve Erhart worked hard to land big names in the first year including running back Tim Spencer (Ohio State) who signed with the Chicago Blitz, Herschel Walker (University of Georgia) the New Jersey Generals (a three-year contract worth $1.2 million per year with a $1 million signing bonus, and ownership in one of J. Walter Duncan's oil wells), Greg Landry the Chicago Blitz, Chuck Fusina and Kelvin Bryant both with the Philadelphia Stars, Steve Spurrier to coach in Tampa Bay, George Allen as the coach of the Chicago Blitz, Red Miller formerly of the Denver Broncos to coach the Denver Gold, and Canadian Football League coaching legends Ray Jauch joining the Washington Federals and Hugh Campbell, joining the L.A. Express.

Under Simmons leadership, the USFL expanded to 18 teams including Pittsburgh, Houston, Oklahoma, Jacksonville, San Antonio, Memphis and New Orleans (moved from Boston), secured TV rights with ESPN, and crowned three Champions – Michigan Panthers (1983), Philadelphia Stars (1984), and Baltimore Stars (1985). The lineup of stars to play in the USFL included Brian Sipe, Steve Young, Bobby Hebert, and Doug Flutie.

Due to Simmons' background in television, there was a perception that the USFL was a "made for television" entity. One of the USFL's first accomplishments under Simmons watch was the signing of a two-year contract with ESPN. It was the cable network's first-ever agreement with a sports league to televise select regular-season games. The USFL also had a two-year deal with ABC, consummated before Simmons' hiring.

The league incurred heavy financial losses and Simmons increasingly came under fire from some club owners for failing to negotiate a more lucrative network television deal. On January 14, 1985, Simmons' resigned as Commissioner. He was replacing by Harry Usher, an attorney who had served as the executive vice president and general manager of the Los Angeles Olympic Organizing Committee. After Simmons's departure, the league tried to move a traditional fall schedule for the 1986 season, but the USFL filed an antitrust lawsuit against the NFL. The USFL did win the case, but was awarded $1 in damages, and the league shut down.

== Personal life ==
Simmons and his wife Harriet met in NYC where she was working as a medical technologist. Harriet was born and raised in Lynn, Massachusetts, with roots in Savannah, Georgia. Their first date included the Elbow Room at the Beekman Towers, and her finishing his meal. They were married in Brentwood, New York, at Simmons' uncle's farm in 1956. Harriet and Chet started their life together in Queens, New York, while Simmons was working in Manhattan in the ad agency business and then later at Sports Programs Inc. founded by Edgar Sherick and later merged with ABC Sports. While living in Jericho, Long Island, their first child Pam was born in 1959 (the same year the Dodgers beat the White Sox to win the World Series) and then Jed in 1960 (the same year the US won Olympic Gold in Men's Ice Hockey in Squaw Valley). With his growing life in sports, the family moved to Manhattan, where son Pete was born in 1969 (the same year the Jets won Super Bowl III and the Mets won the World Series, both broadcast live on NBC Sports). While still with NBC, Chet and Harriet settled in Old Greenwich, Connecticut, in 1971 and had Nicole (Nikki) in 1972 (the year NBC Sports televised the XI Olympic Games in Sapparo, Japan). In 1979, the family moved to West Hartford, Connecticut, near where ESPN was unfolding in Bristol. The USFL called for a return to NYC and life in Greenwich, Connecticut, in 1982. Harriet and Chet moved to Savannah in 1986, and settled on Tybee Island in 1992.
