= ESPN25 =

ESPN Anniversary

- Genre: Sports
- No. of episodes: 25

Original release
- Network: ESPN
- Release: September 7, 2004

ESPN25 was a special event conducted to mark the 25th anniversary of ESPN.

During the run-up to the anniversary date of September 7, 2004, the network counted down the top sports moments of the last 25 years (the "ESPN era"). Each Tuesday, a new 25-to-1 list was unveiled, as was the next headline in that 25-to-1 countdown. In addition, each day during SportsCenter, the next moment in the list of the top 100 moments of the ESPN era was shown. The celebration concluded by declaring the Miracle on Ice hockey game between the United States and the Soviet Union at the 1980 Winter Olympic Games the #1 moment, game, and headline of the last 25 years.

== The Headlines ==
ESPN also had a weekly series, The Headlines, hosted by Bob Ley, counting down the top 25 stories since 1979, "stories that at some point jumped off the sports page, and onto the front page."

== Old School Week ==
Several former ESPN anchors were invited back to co-anchor the nighttime Sportscenter broadcast with ESPN anchors of the time, during an "old school week".

- Craig Kilborn, alongside Dan Patrick, broadcast Sunday, September 8, 2004;
- Charley Steiner, alongside Bob Ley, broadcast Monday, September 9, 2004;
- Gayle Gardner, alongside Stuart Scott, broadcast Tuesday, September 10, 2004;
- Greg Gumbel, alongside Chris Berman, broadcast Wednesday, September 11, 2004;
- George Grande, alongside Chris Berman, broadcast Thursday, September 12, 2004.

== Who's #1? ==
Immediately following The Headlines (before The Headlines in the early portion of the summer), Stuart Scott hosted Who's #1?, which counts down the top 25 of the last 25 years in some category. Who's #1 has since expanded into a weekly series on ESPN Classic, with additional categories and a new host, Trey Wingo. In the weekly series, only 20 items are revealed, and, in a post-show segment, the "Second Guessers" debate the choices.

== Missing footage ==
Conspicuously absent from the entire ESPN25 series was all but a few seconds of footage from National Football League games. During the Headlines show about 9/11, ESPN aired the entrance of Dallas Cowboys defensive back George Teague entering Texas Stadium with the American flag when the NFL resumed play after the attacks; otherwise, it had to air still photographs whenever the league was mentioned. Neither the league nor ESPN explained why the footage was absent, but the network had just shown Playmakers, a weekly drama show about a fictitious professional football team called the Cougars. The show's blunt treatment of off-the-field problems drew criticism from NFL officials, and reports surfaced that the NFL threatened not to renew ESPN's television contract with the league if Playmakers was renewed for a second season. The show was not renewed.
