= Robert Flores =

American sports journalist (born 1970)

- Born: Robert Flores; July 7, 1970 (age 56)
- Education: University of Houston
- Occupation: Sportscaster
- Notable credit: SportsCenter (2007–2016)

Robert Flores (born July 7, 1970) is a sports journalist, who works for MLB Network and NHL Network as a studio host for each. He fills in for Hot Stove on MLB Network. Flores formerly worked at ESPN. Joining the network in 2005, Flores was an anchor for ESPNEWS and for ESPN's SportsCenter (2007–2016). Flores provided studio updates during each game of ABC College Football, and Saturday Night Football. He also served as a substitute studio host for ESPN2's Friday Night Fights. Flores hosted the live afternoon edition of SportsCenter from noon - 3 p.m. with Chris McKendry until early September 2009, when he was replaced with John Buccigross. He was also a substitute host for Baseball Tonight. Flores announced on February 4, 2016, that he would be leaving ESPN after ten years. In Fehburary of 2026, San Diego Studio Announced that he will be the play by play in Diamond dynasty, the same day Jessica Mendoza will be announcing for the NCAA baseball playoffs. He does play by play in Play vs CPU, Mini Seasons, Dimaond Quest, Battle Royale, Event Games, Ranked Seasons, etc.

Flores is a native of Houston, Texas. He attended J. Frank Dobie High School in Houston and is in the JFD Hall of Fame. He graduated from the University of Houston with a B.A. in Radio/Television in 1992.

A noted fan of professional wrestling, Flores is also the owner of a Louisville Slugger Ric Flair model bat, autographed by Flair himself.

== Notable incidents ==
In 2006, Flores was co-anchoring ESPNEWS with Danyelle Sargent when she made her now infamous statement "What the fuck was that," due to technical difficulties. Flores was once fired for muttering the same curse word on-air in 2004 when he worked for KEYE in Austin, Texas, on a taped segment that was not intended for air.

In March 2015, he made a comment on SportsCenter that Iggy Azalea is "killing hip-hop" leading to numerous verbal jabs between him and Azalea's then boyfriend NBA shooting guard Nick Young.
