= Jersey's Talking =

Jersey's Talking was a New Jersey prime-time television talk show that ran from 1996 to 2002. It was seen in more than two million cable households throughout the state on News 12 New Jersey. Hosted by Lee Leonard, the live, one-hour, interview program featured celebrities, authors, actors, musicians, and newsmakers of interest to New Jersey residents. The show featured three guests per show, each interviewed for approximately 15 minutes. The show frequently featured live music performances, viewer call-ins, trivia contests, and prize giveaway segments.

Airing live from 8-9 pm, Monday through Friday, the program held a repeat broadcast later in the evening, in addition to the following day, from 1-2 pm. It also aired Saturdays and Sundays.

The show was originally titled What Jersey's Talking About and aired live from 1-2 pm, Mondays through Fridays, with additional rebroadcasts.

== Host ==
The host, Lee Leonard, was a familiar face and voice to people living in the tri-state area for hosting a variety of news and talk programs on television and radio. Leonard worked previously for CBS Sports’ The NFL Today, NBC Sports, ABC Talk Radio, WNBC-AM, WABC-AM, WNEW-TV’s Midday Live and Sports Extra, and CNBC. Leonard was also the former co-host of Showbiz Today on CNN, and was a New York correspondent for Entertainment Tonight. Leonard had more than 20 years of interview experience with thousands of celebrities, including Frank Sinatra and Elvis Presley

== Producers ==
Christopher Welch co-wrote, co-booked, and produced the program from 1996 to 2000.

While at News 12 New Jersey, Welch also co-produced Fred Friendly Seminars, hosted by Jack Ford, which aired on News 12 New Jersey and PBS. Welch also produced the News 12 New Jersey town meetings "Is It Safe to Learn?", hosted by David Toma, and "New Jersey: Uncovered," hosted by Jim McQueeny.

Welch left Jersey's Talking in 2000. He previously worked as an assistant editor at New Jersey Monthly magazine.

David DeVita was a long-time co-writer and co-booker for the program.

== Theme ==
The opening music and "bump" music featured two instrumental pieces by Tom Timko and the Horndogs.

== Guests ==
Guests included U.S. Sen. Bill Bradley, Mary Higgins Clark, Uncle Floyd, Gov. Florio, John Shelby Spong, Gail Sheehy, Theodore Edgar McCarrick, Ed Koch, Steve Allen, Peter Maas, Charles Cummings, John Cunningham, Clement Price, Ed McMahon, Sen. Robert Torricelli, David Toma and Dave Frieder New York's Bridge Photographer.

Musical guests included Rick Danko, Aaron "Professor Louie" Hurwitz, Barry Mann, Richie Havens, Maureen McGovern, Stanley Jordan, Melba Moore, Al Di Meola, Clint Holmes, Vanessa Rubin, Jerry Vale, Julie Wilson, Bucky Pizzarelli, John Pizzarelli, Gloria Gaynor, Jimmy Roselli, Rockapella, Jon Lucien, Margaret Whiting, Jane Monheit, Stacey Kent, Cyro Baptista, and David Broza.
