= Who's No. 1? =

- Presented by: Stuart Scott

Original release
- Network: ESPN25
- Release: 2004

Who's No. 1? is a sports series that debuted on ESPN25 in 2004 to celebrate the 25th anniversary of ESPN. Hosted by Stuart Scott, the show counted down a “Top 25 over the last 25 Years” list, counting down to #1, in such categories as Best Teams, Worst Teams, Biggest Flops, Greatest Records, Most Outrageous Characters, Biggest Controversies, etc. during the history of ESPN, which debuted on September 7, 1979. The final episode, “The Best 25 Games over the Last 25 Years,” was televised on September 7—ESPN's 25th birthday. The show made its ESPN Classic debut on May 2, 2005 with Trey Wingo as host; this series is similar to its ESPN25 predecessor but has a Top 20 list and new features such as Best Masters, Best College Football Bowls, Greatest Game 7s, etc. and counts down to the top of all time, rather than the last 25 years. It also concludes with a "Second Guessers" segment where some of the rankings are questioned.
