= Ann Kreiter =

American television host

Ann Kreiter (formerly Ann Werner) is a sports producer for WMAQ-TV in Chicago, Illinois. Formerly she was a studio host for the Big Ten Network, which she joined when that network was launched in 2007 until her departure in 2010.

== Personal ==
Kreiter is a native of Wisconsin. She graduated from Northwestern University in 1993.

== Career ==
Kreiter began her career working at stations in La Crosse, Wisconsin and Green Bay, Wisconsin. During her tenure at ESPN, Kreiter was a reporter for SportsCenter and NFL Countdown. She worked there beginning in 2000. She may be best known for reporting from Milwaukee, Wisconsin, on the days following the September 11, 2001 attacks. She covered Major League Baseball commissioner Bud Selig's decision to suspend play as the nation mourned. Kreiter produces for WTTW-11, the PBS affiliate in Chicago, Illinois. She also spent two years with Fox Sports Net in Chicago .
