= Gary Striewski =

American news anchor

Gary Lee Striewski (born January 11, 1987) is an anchor for ESPN best known for his work on SportsCenter and SportsCenter on Snapchat.

He graduated from Metropolitan State University of Denver in 2010. He is also a former sideline anchor for the Boston Red Sox on the New England Sports Network and a former co-host of the children's program NESN Clubhouse. Striewski announced that he was leaving NESN on Jan. 31, 2017. He joined ESPN in March 2018.

== Early life ==
Striewski is part Polish on his father's side and Korean on his mother's side. He married TV host Abbey Carnivale on July 18, 2026.
