= Courtney Cronin =

American sport journalist (born 1990)

Courtney Cronin (born August 1, 1990) is an ESPN reporter who covers the Chicago Bears football organization. She was a panelist on Around the Horn and makes appearances on First Take and SportsCenter, among other ESPN shows. She joined the network in 2017 as a Minnesota Vikings reporter before moving to report for the Chicago Bears in 2022. She was promoted to the Bears reporting duties after the death of Jeff Dickerson.

== Early life and education ==
A native of Glenview, Illinois, Cronin attended Indiana University Bloomington from 2008 to 2012, graduating with degrees in journalism and Spanish. During her time at IU, she was employed at Indiana University Student Television and served as sports director during her final senior year. She assisted in launching IUSport.com. After completing four years of college, she accepted a postgraduate internship in digital communications at the NCAA.

== Career ==
Once her postgraduate internship was completed, Cronin accepted a reporter and editor position at The Clarion-Ledger in Jackson, Mississippi, in 2013 covering Southeastern Conference and high school athletics. In 2016, she became a multimedia sports reporter for the San Jose Mercury News, and joined ESPN a year later. She made her Around The Horn debut on June 1, 2022.
