= Gayle Gardner =

American sportscaster

Gayle Gardner (born c. 1950) is an American sportscaster who worked for ESPN and NBC Sports beginning in 1987 until 1993. Gardner is considered a pioneer in sports broadcasting, having been the first female sports anchor to appear weekly on a major network.

== Career ==
Gardner graduated from Brooklyn College in 1969 and earned a master's degree in film and broadcasting from Boston University in 1971.

Gardner started her career in Boston under the name Gail Granik. She began working as an intern for WBZ-TV and after graduating from BU she became an associate producer for the station's Sonya Hamlin Show. By 1974, she was the show's executive producer. She then worked as the producer of the Pat Collins Show on WCBS-TV. She returned to WBZ in 1976 as the executive producer and interviewer for the station's New England Patriots pregame show. In 1977, she began making appearances on WBZ's news broadcasts, serving as a tertiary sports anchor behind Len Berman and Jimmy Myers. In 1978, she became the nightly sports anchor for WDIV-TV in Detroit. At the time of her hiring she was the only woman to serve as a daily sports anchor in a top-10 market. She then worked as a reporter and weekend sports anchor for WJZ-TV in Baltimore.

After being hired by ESPN in 1983, Gardner served as a SportsCenter anchor for three years. Gardner then worked for NBC from 1987 to 1993. Among the assignments that she undertook included anchoring NBC's New Year's Day college football bowl game coverage, NFL Live!, Major League Baseball: An Inside Look, NBC's 1988 and 1992 Summer Olympics coverage, the French Open, Wimbledon, and NBC's "Prudential Sports Updates". In 1989, she became the first woman to regularly host Major League Baseball games for a major television network, NBC.

In January 1989, Gardner was a member of the NBC broadcast team for Super Bowl XXIII (San Francisco vs. Cincinnati).

On August 3, 1993, Gardner became the first woman to do televised play-by-play of a baseball game when she called the action of a game between the Colorado Rockies and the Cincinnati Reds.

Gardner later worked on the Food Network before writing a screenplay. She spent three years on the Food Network.

In 2004 (to celebrate the 25th anniversary of SportsCenter), Gardner returned to anchor a special "old school" edition of SportsCenter alongside Stuart Scott.

== See also ==
- Women in baseball
