= SportsCenter =

American sports news television series

- Created by: Chet Simmons
- Presented by: For current anchors and analysts, see section below (for past on-air staff, see SportsCenter anchors and reporters)
- Theme music composer: Vangelis (1979–1985); John Colby (1989–2007); Annie Roboff (2007–present); Timbaland (2015–2020); Trouble Funk (2020–present)
- Opening theme: "Pulstar" (1979–1990) "SportsCenter Theme" (1990–present)
- Ending theme: Same as opening
- Country of origin: United States
- Original language: English
- No. of seasons: 48
- No. of episodes: 60,000+

Production
- Production locations: Bristol, Connecticut (daytime and evening editions); Washington, D.C. (Scott Van Pelt edition); Los Angeles (1:00 a.m. ET edition) (2009–2025)
- Camera setup: Multi-camera
- Running time: 30–90 minutes (depending on content)
- Production company: ESPN

Original release
- Network: ESPN (1979–present); ESPN2 (2009–present); ESPNews (2010–present); ABC (2020–present)
- Release: September 7, 1979 – present

SportsCenter (SC) is an American television sports news broadcasting show broadcast on ESPN and ABC. Originally anchored by Chris Berman, George Grande, Greg Gumbel, Lee Leonard, Bob Ley, Sal Marchiano and Lou Palmer, it premiered on September 7, 1979. Cristina Alexander, Matt Barrie, Nicole Briscoe, John Buccigross, Madelyn Burke, Linda Cohn, Kevin Connors, Courtney Cronin, Brian Custer, Michael Eaves, Rich Eisen, Jay Harris, Alyssa Lang, Steve Levy, Keiana Martin, Molly McGrath, Kevin Negandhi, Kelsey Riggs Cuff, Treavor Scales, Randy Scott, Amina Smith, Hannah Storm, Gary Striewski, Scott Van Pelt, Sara Walsh, and Christine Williamson currently serve as anchors. The show covers various sports teams and athletes from around the world and often shows highlights of sports from the day. Originally broadcast only once per day, SportsCenter now has up to twelve airings each day, excluding overnight repeats. The show often covers the major sports in the United States including basketball, hockey, football, and baseball. SportsCenter is also known for its recaps after sports events and its in-depth analysis.

The show has broadcast more than 60,000 episodes, more than any other program on American television; SportsCenter is broadcast from ESPN's studio facilities in Bristol, Connecticut, Washington, D.C. and Los Angeles.

== Overview and format ==
As of October 2026, SportsCenter normally runs live at the following times:

- Weekdays: 7:00–8:00 a.m., 5:00–5:30 p.m., 6:00–7:00 p.m. and 11:00 p.m.–1:00 a.m. ET.
- Saturday: 7:00 a.m.–9:00 a.m., and 12:00 am.–2:00 a.m. ET.
- Sunday: 7:00–9:00 a.m., and 11:00 p.m.–12:30 a.m. ET.

The program's runtime and starting time depend on the games' runtime. In case a game overlaps the starting time of any SportsCenter edition, it is occasionally moved to either ESPN2 or ESPNews (depending on whether one of the networks is carrying an event) until the event concludes. Conversely, SportsCenter may start early and run longer if the preceding event finishes early or breaking news requires it.

Most editions of the show originate from a studio at ESPN's headquarters in Bristol, Connecticut. However, the Scott Van Pelt edition of SportsCenter has been produced out of a studio in Washington, D.C., inside the ABC News bureau since 2020, in the former studio of Around the Horn. The 1 a.m. Eastern edition of SportsCenter has been produced out of ESPN's Los Angeles Production Center at L.A. Live since 2009; that edition also is repeated during the overnight hours.

ESPN also produces short 90-second capsules known as SportsCenter Right Now, which air at select points within game telecasts on the network and sister broadcast network ABC to provide updates of other ongoing and recently concluded sporting events.

In addition to providing game highlights and news from the day in sports outside of the scheduled slate of games (including team player and management transactions, injury reports and other news), the program also features live reports from sites of sports events scheduled to be held or already concluded, extensive analysis of completed and upcoming sports events from sport-specific analysts and special contributors, and feature segments providing interviews with players, coaches, and franchise management in the headlines. In addition to airing simulcasts or network-exclusive editions on sister networks ESPN2 and ESPNews, the program also produces short in-game updates during sports events aired on ABC and until 2017, an interstitial play countdown segment for fellow network Disney XD.

=== Conditions to showing highlights ===
Some sports leagues and organizations, including the National Basketball Association (NBA), National Hockey League (NHL), and college athletic conferences that are members of the National Collegiate Athletic Association (NCAA) and the National Association of Intercollegiate Athletics (NAIA), allow for brief highlights to be shown while a game is in progress. From 2006 to 2013, Major League Baseball only allowed ongoing game highlights to air during SportsCenter within the Baseball Tonight Extra segments in the broadcast. The National Football League (NFL) does not permit the use of highlights for games that are ongoing at all, outside of those featured within its own live game broadcasts on the league's broadcast partners.

ESPN is traditionally unable to air highlights of Olympic events until after they have aired on tape-delay on NBC (which currently holds the American rights to the Olympic Games through 2032) or its co-owned sister cable networks. ESPN began showing more Olympics highlights on-air and online beginning with the 2006 Winter Olympics, with the network obtaining these extended rights from NBC as part of the 2006 deal that saw ABC release Al Michaels from his contract, in order to join John Madden and key production personnel for the new NBC Sunday Night Football (this same deal also reverted rights to the Walt Disney-produced Oswald the Lucky Rabbit cartoons from Universal Pictures, which originally distributed the shorts).

In addition, there are many anecdotal reports of various television networks (such as CBS Sports, NBC Sports, and BeIN Sports) that will not release highlights of certain sporting events to ESPN, unless the originating U.S. broadcaster's name is displayed on-screen for the entire length of the highlight (for example, "Courtesy NBC Sports").

Starting in 2007 and until its final season of broadcasting in 2014, ESPN stopped displaying the actual name of the NASCAR Nationwide Series or Sprint Cup Series race during highlights of such events (for example, the "Allstate 400 at the Brickyard" was referred to as the "Brickyard 400 pres. by Golden Corral"), unless the title sponsor of the race is paid for to the network; a similar stipulation also applied to the network's IndyCar Series coverage until 2018.

== History ==
SportsCenter was conceived in 1979 and created by ESPN executives Chet Simmons and Scotty Connal. The program was originally anchored by Chris Berman, George Grande, Greg Gumbel, Lee Leonard, Bob Ley, Sal Marchiano and Tom Mees.

=== 1970s ===
Grande introduced the country to ESPN when he co-anchored the premiere episode of SportsCenter on September 7, 1979, with Leonard, a longtime New York City sports broadcaster. According to Entertainment Weekly, Leonard said in the opening of the show: "If you're a fan, what you will see in the next minutes, hours, and days to follow may convince you that you've gone to sports heaven." Grande spent ten more years with ESPN and SportsCenter until he left the network in 1989.

Chris Berman joined ESPN one month after its launch and became a fixture on the program until the early 1990s, when his efforts became more focused on National Football League and Major League Baseball coverage. He does, however, still occasionally appear as a substitute anchor. Bob Ley, who also hosted Outside the Lines, regularly appeared on the Sunday morning edition of SportsCenter until his retirement in 2019.

=== 1980s ===
In 1988, the program's format was changed by executive producer Walsh from focusing on individual sports or leagues to a "newspaper-style" structure, prioritizing stories by importance rather than by sport.

The program's title sequence during its early years included various kinds of sports balls flying outward, set to a rapid-fire electronic music version of "Pulstar" by Vangelis. By 1989, the first of several theme songs to incorporate ESPN's trademark six-note fanfare went into use. The theme music was originally composed by John Colby, who served as ESPN's music director from 1984 to 1992, creating and producing music for various sporting events and programs seen on the network. The current version of the theme was composed in 2006 by Annie Roboff, who also co-wrote Faith Hill's 1998 hit "This Kiss".

=== 1990s ===
In 1994, ESPN launched the This Is SportsCenter advertising campaign, a series of humorous, tongue-in-cheek spots featuring anchors and crew, based on the show's opening tagline. The ads ran from 1995 to 2024 when the campaign was replaced by "My Life, My Team." The team of Dan Patrick and Keith Olbermann—who anchored the 11:00 p.m. (Eastern) edition of the program—achieved great popularity during the late 1980s and the 1990s, a period interrupted by Olbermann's brief move to spin-off channel ESPN2 upon that network's launch in 1993. After Olbermann left ESPN in 1997, Kenny Mayne became Patrick's co-anchor on the late broadcast; when Patrick was moved to the 6:00 p.m. edition, Rich Eisen and Stuart Scott became the show's primary anchor team.

=== 2000s ===
In 2001, Toronto-based Bell Globemedia and ESPN (which received a minority stake) jointly acquired The Sports Network (TSN). As part of its shift to ESPN-influenced branding, the specialty channel rebranded its existing sports news program SportsDesk and changed its name to SportsCentre, using the same introductions and theme music as the ESPN version, except with its title rendered using Canadian spelling.

On September 11, 2001, ESPN interrupted regular programming at 11:05 a.m. Eastern to cover the immediate aftermath of the terror attacks that day through a simulcast of ABC News coverage. ESPN considered suspending that night's editions of SportsCenter, before deciding to air a half-hour edition in which they announced the cancellations of major upcoming sporting events.

On June 7, 2004, SportsCenter began broadcasting in high definition. Along with the conversion, the program introduced a new set designed by Walt Disney Imagineering (situated in a studio located at ESPN's new "Digital Center"), and a new graphics package titled "Revolution" that was developed by Troika Design Group. During that summer, ESPN celebrated its 25th anniversary, by counting down the top 100 moments in sports over the previous 25 years. The countdown was seen on each SportsCenter broadcast daily beginning on May 31, 2004; the countdown concluded with the #1 moment, the United States men's national ice hockey team's victory over the USSR during the 1980 Winter Olympics, airing on September 7, 2004.

During the summer of 2005, SportsCenter premiered a segment called "50 States in 50 Days", where a different SportsCenter anchor traveled to a different state each day to discover the sports, sports history, and athletes of the state.

On April 4, 2006, SportsCenter began to show highlights of Major League Baseball games in progress at the program's airtime; the rights to broadcast these highlights while games were ongoing was previously given exclusivity to fellow ESPN program, Baseball Tonight; the in-progress highlights are shown as part of the "Baseball Tonight Extra" segment. Prior to that date, video footage from MLB games was not shown on any SportsCenter broadcasts until the games completed play.

On February 11, 2007, following the NBA game between the Chicago Bulls and the Phoenix Suns, SportsCenter aired its 30,000th broadcast. The special milestone edition was anchored by Steve Levy and Stuart Scott; Bob Ley, Chris Berman and Dan Patrick made guest appearances to recap events as well as bloopers from the first 10,000 shows (all three men individually counted down each set of 10,000 clips). ESPN also debuted the SportsCenter Minute, a one-minute SportsCenter update that is streamed exclusively on ESPN.com.

Four months later on May 6, another major change to SportsCenter was introduced on that night's 11:00 p.m. (Eastern) edition, with the debut of a "rundown" graphic that appears on the right-side third of the screen. This feature was originally only shown during rebroadcasts of the overnight edition on Monday through Saturday nights, and on the main Sunday night telecast; on ESPNHD, the sidebar graphic filled the right pillarbox where the ESPNHD logo would usually appear when standard definition footage was presented.

The 6:00 p.m. edition of SportsCenter moved one hour earlier to 5:00 p.m. Eastern Time on May 28, 2007; at that time, the early-evening edition was, for the first time, expanded to three hours. During that broadcast, ESPN aired live coverage of Roger Clemens's second start for the New York Yankees' minor league affiliate in Scranton, Pennsylvania. The 11:00 p.m. Eastern Time edition of SportsCenter on August 7, 2007, which was anchored by John Buccigross and Cindy Brunson, showed live coverage of Barry Bonds's 756th career home run, which broke the old MLB record set by Hank Aaron (ESPN was carrying the game live on ESPN2). In August 2008, the former WWE employee Jonathan Coachman joined ESPN to anchor the show.

On August 11, 2008, during the opening week of the 2008 Beijing Olympic Games, SportsCenter began airing live from 9:00 a.m. to 3:00 p.m. Eastern Time. The original plan was to start the live block three hours earlier at 6:00 a.m. Eastern; however, the network decided to scale back the length of the daytime broadcast before the expansion occurred.

That same year, Hannah Storm (former NBC Sports reporter and anchor of CBS's The Early Show) joined ESPN to anchor the 9:00 a.m. to 12:00 p.m. block of the program. The new format included two teams of two anchors in three-hour shifts:

- 9:00 a.m. – 12:00 p.m. Eastern Time: Kevin Negandhi (originally Josh Elliott) and Hannah Storm
- 12:00 p.m. – 3:00 p.m. Eastern Time: Jay Crawford (originally Robert Flores, then John Buccigross) and Chris McKendry

In addition, Sage Steele would provide updates every 30 minutes from 9:00 a.m. to 3:00 p.m. The changes also included a new website for the program – SportsCenter.com, which launched on August 11, 2008 – to promote more interaction with viewers. To promote these changes, ESPN held an employee casting call to see who would be featured in almost 25 live and unscripted commercials per day. Steve Braband, an International Programmer for the network, won, and was featured in ads shown about every half-hour (excluding from 2:00 to 5:00 p.m. Eastern Time) on ESPN. Additionally, the network launched the website, steveislive.com, featuring Braband's daily appearance schedule, blog, and video clips of past appearances and audition footage.

Upon that network's launch on February 13, 2009, SportsCenter began producing a countdown segment, the SportsCenter High-5, for sister channel Disney XD (which is owned by ESPN majority owner The Walt Disney Company).

On April 6, 2009 (starting with the 9:00 a.m. to 12:00 p.m. Eastern Time edition, which was anchored by Hannah Storm and Sage Steele), SportsCenter debuted a new graphics package that saw the "rundown" graphic – shown during the daytime editions – being shifted to the left side of the screen. On that same date, SportsCenter began producing its 1:00 a.m. Eastern Time edition of SportsCenter live from ESPN's production facilities in the newly constructed L.A. Live complex (just across from the Staples Center) in Los Angeles. The set is virtually identical to the setup at the main facilities in Bristol, and the late-night West Coast broadcast would be produced as simply another edition of the program. Neil Everett and Stan Verrett were appointed as the primary anchors for the Los Angeles-based editions of SportsCenter. A new BottomLine ticker was also unveiled that day on four of the five ESPN networks (ESPN, ESPN2, ESPN Classic and ESPNU); the redesigned ticker was quickly dropped, reverting to the old BottomLine design – which had been in use since April 2003 – due to an equipment failure (however, this ticker was operational for the 2009 NFL draft and the 2009 NBA draft). After technical issues with the revamped BottomLine were fixed, the new BottomLine was reinstated on July 8.

The 2009 U.S. Open Golf Championship, which was repeatedly delayed due to weather, aired on both NBC and ESPN. Portions of ESPN's broadcast, including the early parts of the Monday final round, were presented under the "SportsCenter at the U.S. Open" banner – using a similar branding as the segments-within-the-show focusing on nightly highlights and analysis of a particular event originating from the event locations (such as "SportsCenter at the Super Bowl" and "SportsCenter at the World Series"). In August 2009, Robert Flores – co-anchor of the program's 12:00 to 3:00 p.m. block – was replaced on the early-afternoon broadcasts with John Buccigross.

=== 2010s ===
On August 30, 2010, ESPN expanded SportsCenter to ESPNews, airing an additional seven hours of the program in separate blocks from 3:00 to 6:00 p.m. and 7:00 to 11:00 p.m. Eastern Time, canceling the channel's self-named rolling coverage. By late 2010, the "rundown" graphic was expanded to all editions of SportsCenter. On April 22, 2011, Josh Elliott – original and main co-anchor of the 9:00 a.m. to 12:00 p.m. Eastern Time block of SportsCenter – left ESPN to become news anchor for ABC's Good Morning America and was replaced on the late morning block of the program by Kevin Negandhi.

By mid-2011, shortly after ESPN and ESPN2 both converted to a 16:9 letterbox format (in compliance with the #10 AFD code) on their primary standard definition feeds, SportsCenter began showing all high-definition and standard-definition footage in the appropriate aspect ratio on the SD feed (with stylized pillarboxes adorned with the ESPN logo used on footage presented in standard definition). That same year on October, the former WWE employee Todd Grisham joined ESPN to anchor the show. The move required the letterboxed image to be shrunk in order to be displayed in that manner, with the "rundown" graphic continuing to be placed on the left side of the screen. In August 2011, John Anderson – who previously served as the 11:00 p.m. (Eastern) anchor – was moved to the early-evening 6:00 p.m. broadcast, replacing Brian Kenny (who departed ESPN to become a program host for the MLB Network). ESPN launched a completely redesigned SportsCenter.com website on October 16, 2011.

On August 25, 2012, the BottomLine was used to acknowledge the death of astronaut Neil Armstrong, the first man to walk on the Moon. It was reportedly only the fifth of six times that an outside news event not involving an athlete was reported on the ticker, alongside the news of the September 11 attacks, the death of civil rights pioneer Rosa Parks in 2005, the election of Barack Obama as President of the United States in 2008, the Killing of Osama bin Laden, and the later death of former South African president Nelson Mandela on December 5, 2013.

On December 3, 2012, Lindsay Czarniak became the main co-anchor of the 6:00 p.m. edition of SportsCenter. On February 8 and 9, 2013, the 11:00 p.m. editions of SportsCenter on both nights were broadcast from Los Angeles, due to a massive snowstorm in the Northeastern United States that prevented some staff from conducting the program out of ESPN's Bristol headquarters. Stan Verrett anchored both editions from the network's Los Angeles studios.

In late March 2013, David Lloyd and Sage Steele, both of whom were previously co-anchored the weekend morning editions – moved to the weekday early-afternoon block (from 1:00 to 3:00 p.m. Eastern). The current daytime format, which was implemented that month, now features three teams of two anchors in two-hour shifts. On June 21, 2013, a large LED high definition monitor placed behind the main anchor desk was added to the main SportsCenter set in the network's Bristol facility.

In February 2014, production of the weeknight 1:00 and 2:00 a.m. (Eastern Time) editions of SportsCenter was temporarily relocated back to Bristol, due to renovations being made at the network's SportsCenter studio in Los Angeles. In addition, Neil Everett and Stan Verrett – both of whom had anchored SportsCenter from Los Angeles since 2009 – were moved back to the network's headquarters, before both hosts and the program's production returned to the then-newly renovated Los Angeles studio on June 23, 2014.

On June 22, 2014, SportsCenter began broadcasting from Studio X of ESPN's new Digital Center 2 facility, which concurrently resulted in a major overhaul to the program's production and on-air appearance. The new studio incorporates over 114 displays – including two touchscreens, large vertical screens, and a "multidimensional" video wall consisting of 56 monitors of varying sizes and positions that can be used to create pseudo-3D effects. The monitor displays can be used to show video content (such as highlights) and other relevant imagery (such as statistics), emphasizing the ability for anchors to present content on-set through means other than just through voiceovers. A new graphics package was also introduced, emphasizing a bolder, yet more simplified look – in both their appearance and the level of content. To coincide with the redesign of SportsCenter, a revised variant of ESPN's BottomLine ticker was introduced to complement the new graphical design, using a dark grey color scheme. A downscaled replica of DC2's set was constructed for broadcasts originating from ESPN's Los Angeles studio.

On February 2 and 3, 2015, Lindsay Czarniak anchored the 6:00 p.m. (Eastern) edition of SportsCenter from ESPN's Los Angeles facilities, due to a major snowstorm that hit the Northeastern United States the previous weekend, which also affected ESPN's main facilities in Bristol. The previous week from January 26 to 30, Czarniak had co-anchored the 6:00 p.m. edition alongside John Anderson from the parking lot of the Scottsdale Fashion Square in Scottsdale, Arizona as part of the program's coverage of Super Bowl XLIX. After that week, Anderson was moved back to the 11:00 p.m. broadcast, making Czarniak the solo anchor of the 6:00 p.m. editions on weeknights starting on February 2.

On September 7, 2015, Scott Van Pelt became the solo anchor of a revised 12:00 a.m. (Eastern) edition of the program, which is more freeform than other SportsCenter editions and promoted as SportsCenter at Night, or SC@Night for short. In addition to featuring highlights and discussion panels, it features Van Pelt's analysis of sports events in a style similar to that conducted on his former radio talk show SVP and Russillo, during the replacement of Danny Kanell as the new co-host of Russillo Show alongside Ryen Russillo, and utilizes a modified version of the show's theme (composed by Timbaland), as well as a different lighting and graphics set.

In October 2015, Ronda Rousey became the first female athlete to guest host on the show.

On February 8, 2016, SportsCenter moved its start time from 9:00 to 7:00 a.m. Eastern Time, with the launch of a new three hour morning block from 7:00 to 10:00 a.m., titled SportsCenter:AM, also branded SC:AM. Maintaining a faster-paced format, the program focuses on highlights from the previous night in the first hour, the top plays and moments of the previous night's sporting events in the second hour, and the upcoming day in sports in the third hour. SportsCenter:AM also shares resources with Good Morning America and ESPN2/ESPN Radio's Mike & Mike.

On October 11, 2016, ESPN named His & Hers co-hosts Jemele Hill and Michael Smith as co-anchors of the 6:00 p.m. ET edition of SportsCenter, effective February 6, 2017 (the day after Super Bowl LI). They replaced Lindsay Czarniak, who had been anchoring the 6:00 p.m. ET edition of the show since December 3, 2012.

On November 13, 2015, ESPN interrupted regular programming around 3:00 p.m. Eastern Time, to cover the immediate aftermath of the terror attacks on Stade de France and downtown Paris as well as the hostage situation in the Bataclan theatre, where a concert by American rock band Eagles of Death Metal was interrupted by terrorists who killed 89 people. ESPN FC correspondent Jonathan Johnson, as well as then French president François Hollande, were attending the game in the Stade de France, around which the three explosions occurred. While Hollande was evacuated from the stadium at half-time, Johnson remained in the stadium, and after the game he described to the viewers the panic of the fans who attended the game and then rushed the field, after being noticed by the Stade de France's PA announcer. After the hostage crisis ended, a special edition of the program was aired, featuring analysis and reports on the impact that the Paris attacks had on the sports world and social media reactions of sportspeople to the attacks, announcing the postponements of some major European sporting events that had been announced up to that weekend.

On January 3, 2017, the 10:00 a.m. and 11:00 a.m. ET editions of SportsCenter moved from ESPN to ESPN2, effectively switching channels with the two-hour debate program First Take, which moved from ESPN2 to ESPN.

On February 6, 2017, the newly revamped 6:00 p.m. ET of SportsCenter, known as SC6 with Michael/Jemele (pronounced SportsCenter at 6), debuted with Michael Smith and Jemele Hill as co-anchors. This new format featured some elements taken from Smith and Hill's former show, His & Hers and, like SportsCenter with SVP, was more freeform than other editions of SportsCenter. In addition, SC6 focused on the night ahead in sports, as well as breaking sports news as warranted.

On April 26, 2017, SportsCenter anchors Jay Crawford, Chris Hassel, Jade McCarthy, Sara Walsh and Jaymee Sire (who had co-anchored SportsCenter:AM since its debut on February 8, 2016) were among the 100 staffers who were let go by ESPN.

Several notable changes were implemented for SportsCenter beginning on August 28, 2017. Sage Steele and Randy Scott replaced Sire (who was laid off four months earlier) and Kevin Negandhi as co-anchors for the weekday editions of SportsCenter:AM joining Jay Harris, while Matt Barrie and Elle Duncan co-anchor the weekend editions of SportsCenter:AM alongside Negandhi (who has since left that show to co-anchor the weeknight 6:00 p.m. ET editions of SportsCenter with Steele). In another notable change, the "rundown" graphic has been permanently removed after a decade and (with the exception of the midnight ET edition with Scott Van Pelt) it has now been replaced by a bug on the lower-left portion of the 16:9 screen. The bug now identifies specific editions of SportsCenter (such as SC:AM, SC@Night and so on).

ESPN debuted a brand new advertising campaign for SportsCenter which was created by Droga5 in late 2017. It was originally expected to replace the long-running This Is SportsCenter advertising campaign as it would be discontinued. As of 2020, the latter advertising campaign (This is SportsCenter) is still being shown.

On November 29, 2017, within an announcement of 150 behind-the-scenes staff members being laid off, ESPN announced the end of the primetime SportsCenter editions airing on ESPNews as of November 30 (breaking sports news coverage will be maintained where needed).

Following Jemele Hill's departure from SportsCenter for The Undefeated after the final SC6 show on February 2, 2018, Michael Smith became the solo anchor of the 6:00 p.m. ET edition of SportsCenter, which itself reverted to that title on February 5; Smith himself departed from SportsCenter on March 9. As of March 1, 2021, the weeknight 6:00 p.m. ET editions of SportsCenter are now co-anchored by Kevin Neghandi and Elle Duncan, the latter of whom replaced Sage Steele (who in turn, moved to the noon ET edition).

With the debut of Get Up! on ESPN on April 2, 2018, SportsCenter:AM moved to ESPN2 (the first hour of the latter show has since moved back to ESPN), while Golic and Wingo moved to ESPNews. Consequently, the 10:00 a.m. ET edition of SportsCenter on ESPN2 was eliminated.

On September 6, 2019, in honor of the 40th anniversary of ESPN's launch, Keith Olbermann and Dan Patrick made a surprise on-air reunion as guest hosts for the late-night edition, which featured tributes to their time at the network.

=== 2020s ===
On March 11, 2020, the NBA announced that it would suspend the 2019–20 NBA season indefinitely following the conclusion of that night's games as a result of Rudy Gobert testing positive for COVID-19 before a game between the Utah Jazz and the Oklahoma City Thunder at Chesapeake Energy Arena in Oklahoma City, which caused the game to be initially postponed. The following day, all of the other major sports leagues followed suit in suspending their seasons for an indefinite period in order to combat the COVID-19 pandemic, and several major college basketball tournaments were also canceled after plans to initially play the games without an audience fell through. After the cancellations were announced, ESPN aired a special edition of the program chronicling the effects of the pandemic and its impact on sporting events and the athletes' reactions to the pandemic via social media.

As a result of the pandemic, ESPN significantly reduced the production of SportsCenter, which at the time aired live three times each weekday (noon, 6:00 and 11:00 p.m., all times Eastern) and twice each on Saturday and Sunday.

Beginning with the weekend of September 12, 2020, and also, the week of September 14, 2020, SportsCenter:AM returned to its regularly scheduled daily 7:00 a.m. ET time slot. On weekdays, the first hour of the show is now aired on ESPN from 7–8 a.m. ET, with the remaining two hours on ESPN2 from 8–10 a.m. ET. On weekends, ESPN airs a two-hour block of the show from 7–9 a.m. ET.

On August 29, 2022, SportsCenter debuted a newly revamped Studio X, complete with a larger LED video wall, new LED monitors and a bigger news desk to accommodate in-studio guests. Studio X underwent a second revamp the following summer and on September 7, 2023 (coincidentally the 44th anniversary of ESPN's launch), SportsCenter returned to the main news desk in the same studio, starting with that day's inaugural 2pm ET edition (which replaced the noon ET edition; that time slot has since been filled by The Pat McAfee Show).

On September 10, 2026 to coincide with the start of the 2026 NFL season, the 2pm ET edition of SportsCenter was eliminated and replaced with a new hourlong show, Big Day with Peter Schrager.

== On-air staff ==
=== Current on-air staff ===
Anchors (as of August 2026)

- Cristina Alexander
- Victoria Arlen
- Matt Barrie
- Nicole Briscoe
- John Buccigross
- Madelyn Burke
- Kevin Connors
- Courtney Cronin
- Brian Custer
- Michael Eaves
- Rich Eisen; also with NFL Network
- Jay Harris
- Alyssa Lang
- Steve Levy
- Keiana Martin
- Skubie Mageza
- Molly McGrath
- Kevin Negandhi
- Kelsey Riggs Cuff
- Treavor Scales
- Randy Scott
- Amina Smith
- Hannah Storm
- Gary Striewski
- Scott Van Pelt
- Sara Walsh; also with NFL Network
- Christine Williamson

== Other editions ==
=== SportsCenter Australia ===
SportsCenter Australia is shown on ESPN Australia.

=== ESPN America version ===
On March 1, 2010, ESPN launched a special domestic edition of SportsCenter on its European channel ESPN America. The half-hour program, anchored by Michael Kim, aired Monday through Fridays at 6:00 a.m. Western European Time (7:00 a.m. Central European Time), with a late-night broadcast at 10:30 p.m. WET/11:30 p.m. CET.

In April 2012, the ESPN America edition of the program was expanded to weekends, and moved to 8:00 a.m. WET (9:00 a.m. CET). At that time, a localized version of the program that was previously produced was discontinued and was replaced with an edited version of the 2:00 a.m. Eastern Time telecast from Los Angeles, recut to fit a 45-minute time block through the removal of commercial breaks and stories on European sports (such as soccer); the program began to be repeated at 8.45 a.m., 4:00 p.m. and 4.45 p.m. (WET).

=== ESPN Radio SportsCenter ===
ESPN Radio broadcasts ESPN Radio SportsCenter, which features scores, stats and news headlines, every half an hour throughout all talk programming and every 20 minutes throughout MLB and NFL broadcasts. The updates can be accessed on-demand using the ESPN website/mobile app. The current half hour's file is usually available within 10 1/2 minutes after its first broadcast.

=== SportsCenter AM ===
SportsCenter AM was a radio show on ESPN Radio hosted by ESPN Radio SportsCenter anchor Jay Reynolds. The show has been replaced by First and Last in July 2017. SportsCenter AM featured scores from all major sporting events including the NFL, NBA, NHL, and MLB. The show usually played audio highlights for last minute shots, game winning homers, and other exciting events from the previous day's sporting events.

SportsCenter AM lasted one hour from 4:00 a.m. to 5:00 a.m. ET, re-airing at 5:00 am ET. The show led into Mike and Mike in the Morning. It ran much like the SportsCenter program on ESPN television. Reynolds recapped scores and played audio highlights and earlier interviews from a variety of sports. No live interviews or call-ins took place during the hour. Bob Picozzi did one SportsCenter update at 4:30 a.m. A SportsCenter Express, hosted by Doug Brown, took place where the normal SportsCenter breaks would be, at 4:20 and 4:40 a.m.

=== TSN SportsCentre ===
SportsCentre is the daily sports news television program on TSN, the Canadian sports network in which ESPN is a minority owner. The title is rendered in Canadian spelling. It uses the similar look and format to ESPN's SportsCenter, the current ESPN SportsCenter theme, as well as some of the same features and segments.

=== SportsCenter Philippines ===
SportsCenter Philippines is a local version of SportsCenter, as a result of the partnership between ESPN and Sports5 (now One Sports), a division of Philippine-based media company TV5 Network. It is launched on December 17, 2017, coinciding the 2017–18 season of the Philippine Basketball Association. SportsCenter Right Now, a bulletin version of the program, was launched earlier on November 24, during the Group B rounds of the 2019 FIBA World Cup Qualifiers.

=== SportsCenter on Snapchat ===
SportsCenter on Snapchat is a version of SportsCenter distributed exclusively on Snapchat, with a more relaxed take with host commentary. It debuted November 13, 2017. New episodes are released every day at 5:00 a.m. and previously also on weekdays at 5:00 p.m., both times ET. Hosts of past include Elle Duncan, Janelle Marie Rodriguez, Cassidy Hubbarth, formerly Jason Fitz, Cy Amundson, Gary Striewski, formerly Andrew Hawkins, formerly Treavor Scales, and formerly Mike Golic Jr. Katie Nolan was a host until the start of her show Always Late with Katie Nolan. In March 2018, it was nominated for a Sports Emmy Award for Outstanding Social TV Experience and gets 2 million unique visitors each day.

=== SportsCenter en Español ===
SportsCenter has a Spanish language version in the United States (including Puerto Rico) and Mexico, which is called SportsCenter en Español and is broadcast nightly on ESPN Deportes, ESPN Latin America and Star+. Antonio Valle, Fernando Tirado, Jorge Eduardo Sánchez, José Briseño, José Antonio "Toño" Rodríguez, Julia Headley, Kary Correa and Miguel Ángel Briseño are some of the show's reporters.

== Spin-offs ==
- BassCenter (2003–2006)
- ScoreCenter on ESPN MobileTV (2007–present)
- SportsCenterU (2006–present)
- X Center (2005–present)

== See also ==
- ESPN on ABC – sports programming division
- ESPNews – ESPN's 24-hour sports news network, which carries specialized editions of SportsCenter
- ESPN DTC – an interactive sports streaming service featuring supplementary programming content
- Fox Sports Live – a daily sports news program on Fox Sports 1, which served as the direct competitor of SportsCenter
- The 'Lights – a daily sports highlight program on NBCSN, that differed from both Fox Sports Live and SportsCenter in its use of voiceovers for presenting highlights in lieu of on-camera anchors
