= Sage Steele =

American sports announcer (born 1972)

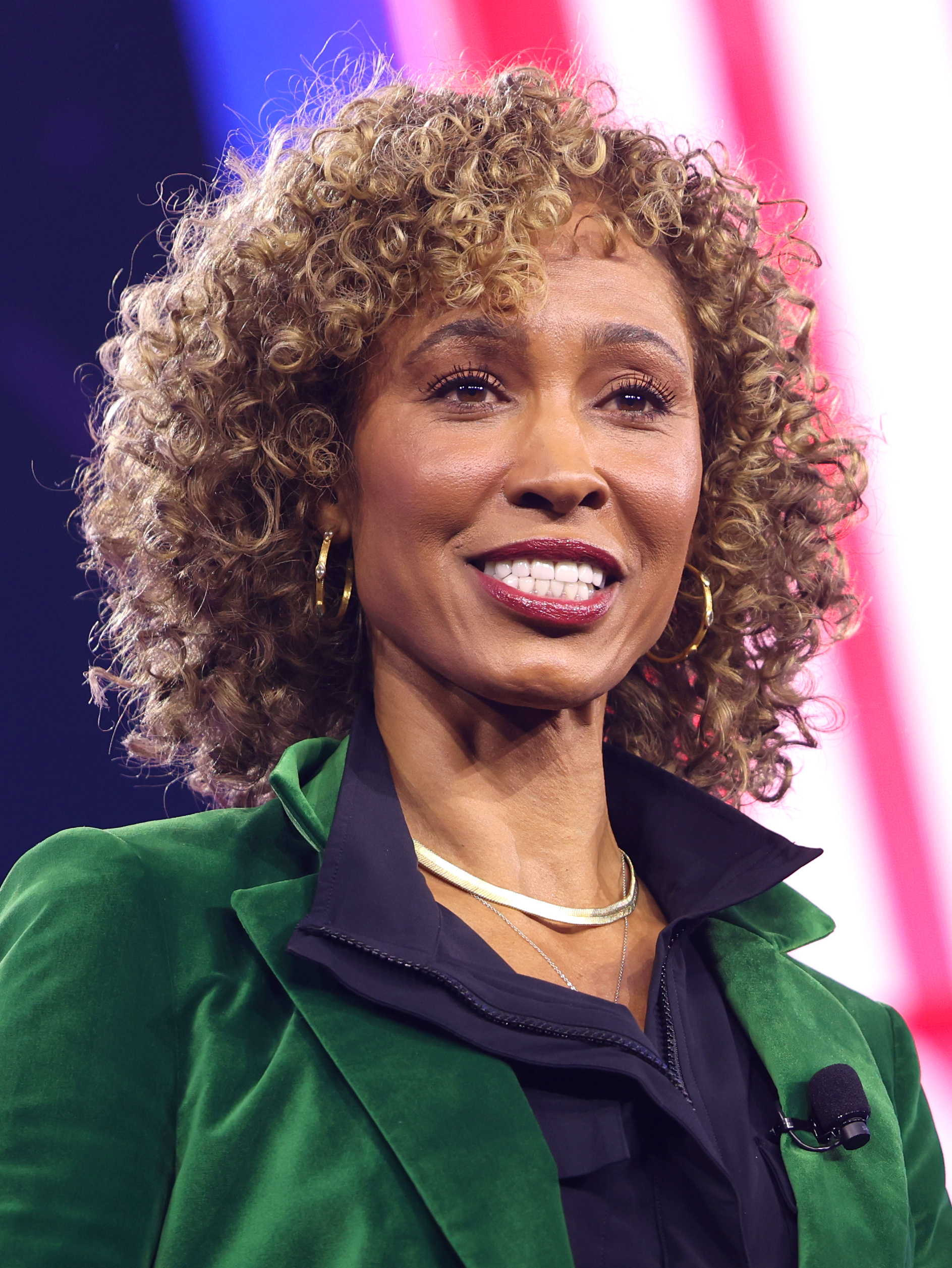
- Steele in 2024
- Born: Sage Marie Steele; November 28, 1972 (age 53); Panama Canal Zone
- Education: Indiana University, Bloomington (BS)
- Spouse(s): Jonathan Bailey (m. 1999; div. 2019) Dave Barbuto (m. 2025)
- Children: 3

YouTube information
- Channel: The Sage Steele Show
- Years active: 2024–present
- Genre: Interviews
- Subscribers: 242 thousand
- Views: 46.7 million
- Last updated: November 10, 2026

Sage Marie Steele (born November 28, 1972) is a former television anchor and co-host of the 12 noon (ET) SportsCenter on ESPN. She also hosted SportsCenter on the Road from various sporting events such as the Super Bowl and The Masters, and NBA Countdown on ESPN and ABC for four seasons, ending in 2017. For five years prior to the NBA assignment, Steele was a full-time host of SportsCenter, ESPN's flagship show, and had previously contributed to ESPN First Take, Mike & Mike in the Morning, and SportsNation. Steele hosted SportsCenter's daytime coverage of the NBA Finals in 2012 and 2013, and covered every NBA Finals from 2012 to 2020.

== Early life ==
Steele is the daughter of Gary and Mona (O'Neil) Steele. Her father is African American and her mother is of Irish-Italian descent. Gary Steele became the first Black varsity football player at West Point during the mid-1960s. He was inducted into the Army Sports Hall of Fame in 2013 for his standout career on the Black Knights football and track & field teams. He retired from the army as a colonel after a career of 23 years.

Sage Steele was born in 1972 into an American Army family living in the Panama Canal Zone. Steele has two brothers, Courtney and Chad (senior vice president of media relations for the NFL's Baltimore Ravens).

The U.S. Army stationed Steele's family in several different states and countries, including Greece and Belgium, before moving back stateside to Colorado Springs, Colorado, in 1984 for her seventh grade year. After attending Thomas B. Doherty High School in Colorado Springs for two years, she moved to Carmel, Indiana, and attended Carmel High School as a senior, graduating in 1990.

She graduated from Indiana University Bloomington in 1995 with a Bachelor of Science degree in sports communication. Exactly 20 years later, she was the commencement speaker at the 2015 Indiana University undergraduate commencement, which she considers the greatest honor of her career.

== Broadcasting career ==
Steele's first television sports reporting job was at WSBT-TV, the CBS affiliate in South Bend, Indiana, as a news producer and reporter from 1995 to 1997.

From there, Steele moved to CBS affiliate WISH-TV in Indianapolis, Indiana. From 1997 to 1998 she worked as the weekend morning sports anchor and weekday reporter. Her reporting duties included the Indianapolis Colts, Indiana Pacers, Indianapolis 500 and Brickyard 400 auto races, and local college and high school sports.

Steele's next stop was the ABC affiliate WFTS in Tampa, Florida, from 1998 to 2001, where she was a sports reporter with former WFTS sports director and former SportsCenter host Jay Crawford and current "NFL RedZone" host Scott Hanson. She also worked at Fox Sports Florida as a reporter, continuing to cover teams throughout Central Florida, including the Tampa Bay Buccaneers, Orlando Magic, Tampa Bay Lightning and South Florida Bulls.

In 2001, Steele joined Comcast SportsNet Mid-Atlantic in Bethesda, Maryland, where she was an anchor and reporter for the network's nightly local sports news program, SportsNite, covering all sports in the Washington, DC/Baltimore region. Steele was one of Comcast SportsNet's original personalities, joining that network when it launched that year. She served six years as a reporter and anchor at CSN Mid-Atlantic (2001–2007), and she was a beat reporter for the Baltimore Ravens.

In 2007, she joined ESPN. She debuted on March 16, 2007, on the 6:00 p.m. ET edition of SportsCenter. In an interview with Awful Announcing, she mentioned that she'd actually been offered a job with the network in 2004, but had turned it down as she was then pregnant with her second child.

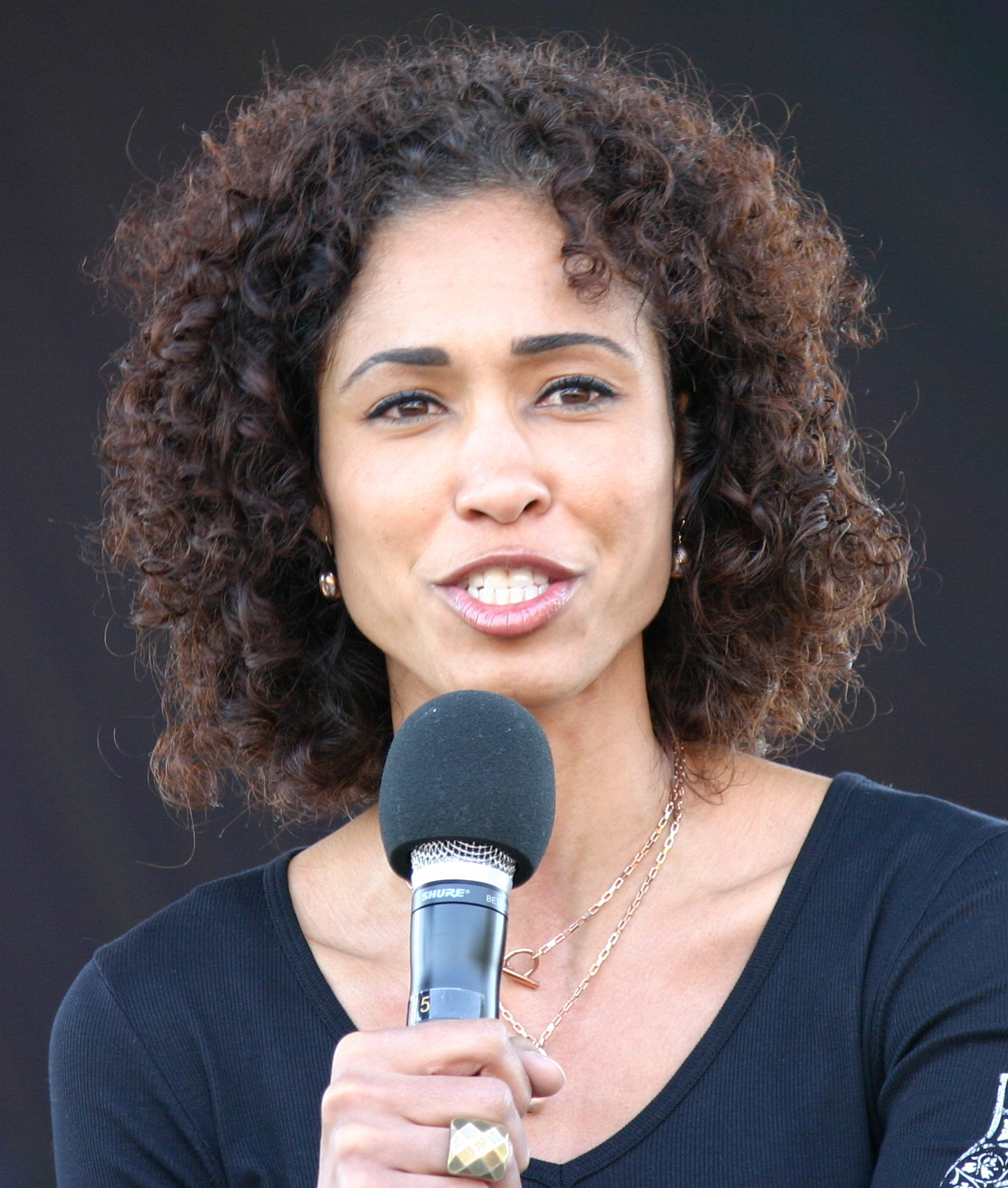
Steele in 2010

On July 28, 2013, she drove the pace car for the NASCAR Sprint Cup Series Brickyard 400. During the pace laps at the beginning of the race, she was bumped in jest by then-five-time Sprint Cup champion Jimmie Johnson.

Beginning in the 2013–14 NBA season, Steele became the host of NBA Countdown on ESPN and ABC, a post she held through 2017.

Steele co-hosted the Miss America 2017 & 2018 pageant on ABC with Chris Harrison. She hosted the Scripps National Spelling Bee from 2010 to 2013. In 2014 she was a guest host several times on The View.

She became the noon (ET) SportsCenter co-anchor with Matt Barrie in February 2021. She had anchored the 6 p.m. ET edition of the show for several years before moving to noon. Prior to that she had anchored SportsCenter:AM.

On October 5, 2021, Steele was suspended with pay by ESPN for remarks she made on Jay Cutler's September 29 podcast about COVID-19 vaccine mandates, women who dress in a way she feels is provocative, and Barack Obama calling himself black even though he, like Steele, has a white mother. In conjunction with her suspension, Steele issued an apology: "I know my recent comments created controversy for the company, and I apologize. We are in the midst of an extremely challenging time that impacts all of us, and it's more critical than ever that we communicate constructively and thoughtfully."

Steele filed a lawsuit against ESPN in April 2022, alleging that the network had retaliated against her in the months following the suspension. Steele's suit accused ESPN of taking opportunities away from her and steadily degrading her career, alleging that her free speech rights were being curtailed through ESPN's retaliation against her for comments she had made as a private citizen. Steele and ESPN settled the lawsuit in August 2023, at which point Steele left the network.

In March 2024, she was named the first podcast host on Bill Maher's Club Random Studios podcast network. Maher said, "I am looking for people who are not talking-point people. I'm looking for people who don't, before they speak, say, 'What's the right answer here?'", adding "She's the perfect choice to be our first new host because, like me, she pissed off Disney. There's a certain poetic symmetry to that."

In April 2024, Steele replaced Candace Owens in the animated series Mr. Birchum after Owens' departure from The Daily Wire, following the latter's "clashes with co-founder Ben Shapiro over the Gaza war".

== Personal life ==
Steele married Jonathan Bailey in 1999. Together, they have three children, two daughters and one son. They divorced in 2019. Steele married Dave Barbuto in 2025. In March 2021, Steele put her home in Avon, Connecticut, on the market for $1.6 million, after doing extensive renovations. Steele is Catholic.

Steele was on the board of the Pat Tillman Foundation.

Steele supports President Donald Trump and campaigned for him during the 2024 United States presidential election. In 2025 Trump thanked Steele for her support when he signed an executive order banning transgender women from women's sports.
