= Jay Harris (sportscaster) =

American journalist (born 1965)

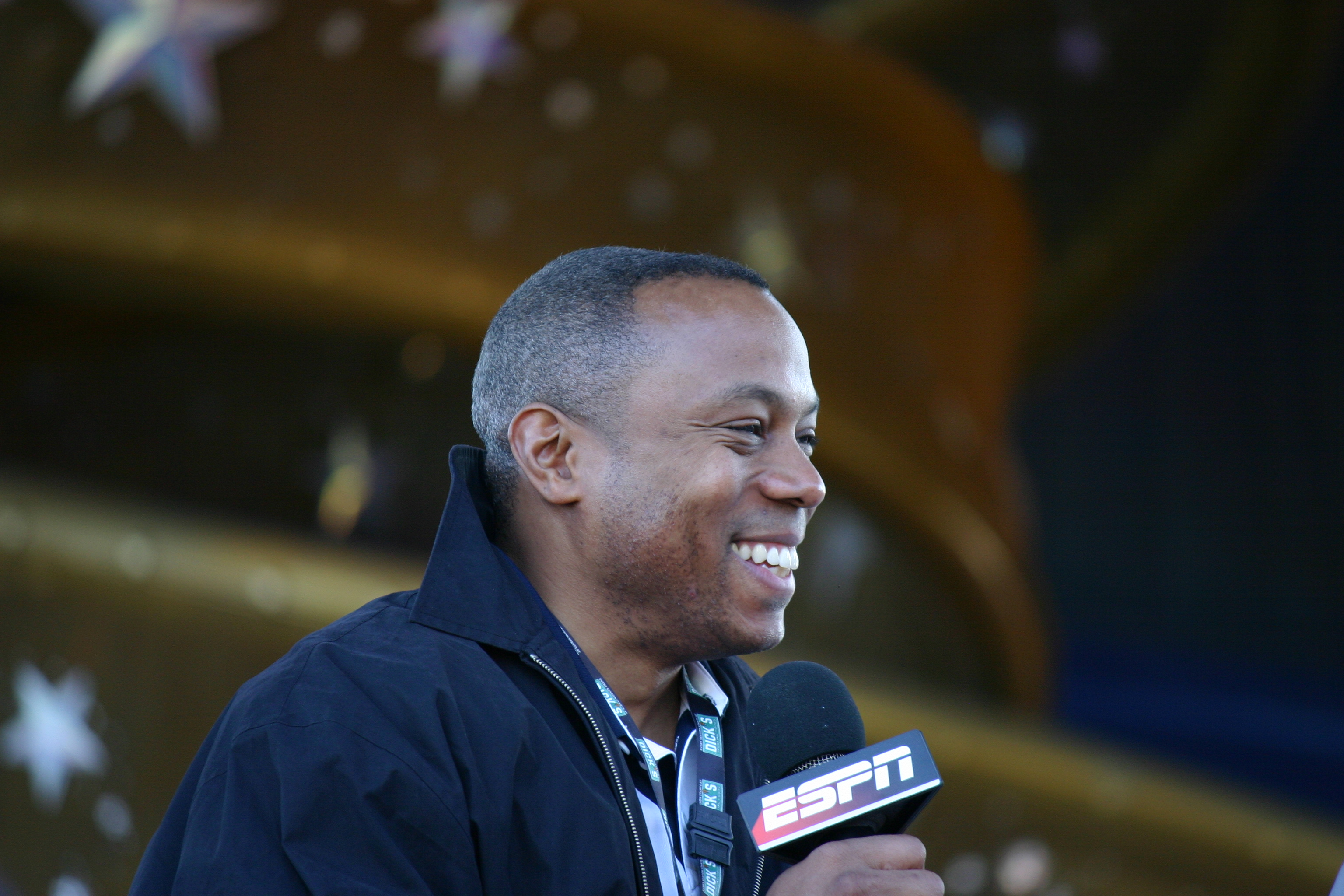
- Harris at ESPN the Weekend at Disney's Hollywood Studios in Orlando, Florida, February 2010
- Born: February 22, 1965; Norfolk, Virginia, U.S.
- Occupation: Journalist
- Spouse: Stephanie Prigmore
- Children: 2

Jay Harris (born February 22, 1965 in Norfolk, Virginia) is an American journalist who has worked for ESPN since February 2003. He works for late night broadcasts, primarily on the 11pm and midnight eastern editions of SportsCenter and previously on the west coast Sportscenter from Los Angeles. He has hosted a variety of shows during his tenure at the network including Sportscenter, Outside the Lines, NFL Live, Baseball Tonight, Cold Pizza, First Take, Friday Night Fights, and ESPN Sports Saturday on ABC.

== Background ==
Prior to ESPN, Harris worked for many years at WPGH-TV in Pittsburgh as a weeknight news anchor. He was also on morning radio broadcasts at WAMO-FM in national news at American Urban Radio Networks in Pittsburgh. He did local radio news at WOWI-FM in Norfolk, Virginia. He also worked for the San Jose Mercury News in San Jose, California and resigned on March 19, 2001, not wanting to fire employees after pressures from Knight Ridder.

== Accolades ==
Harris has received a Silver World Medal from the New York Festivals, a Robert L. Vann award from the Pittsburgh Black Media Federation, an Excel Award from the EXCEL from the Hampton Roads Black Media Professionals. He was part of two Emmy Award-winning Sportscenter shows. He is a 1983 graduate of Chapel Hill High School in Chapel Hill, North Carolina. A 1987 graduate of Old Dominion University in Norfolk, he received a Distinguished Alumni Award in 2003 and served as the keynote speaker for its 100th commencement ceremony and 2004.

== Personal life ==
Harris and Stephanie Prigmore are married and have two children. He is a member of the Nu Theta chapter of the Alpha Phi Alpha fraternity. On the February 22, 2008 episode of SportsCenter, Bill Walton surprised Harris, presenting him with a birthday cake. He told Harris that Harris shares the same birth date with Julius Erving, a famed basketball player with the New Jersey Nets and the Philadelphia 76ers in the NBA.
