= Randy Scott (sportscaster) =

American sportscaster

Randy Scott is an American sportscaster who currently works for ESPN. He previously served as a sports anchor for WNUR sports radio.

== Early life ==
Scott is a native of Vienna, Virginia. His dad served in the US Navy: "When my family finally settled in the Washington, D.C., area after moving around the country because of my dad’s service in the Navy, I remember watching Warner Wolf on the local CBS affiliate and George Michael on the local NBC affiliate. "

== Career ==
Scott was a stand-up comedian for a short period of time: "I tried my hand at standup comedy when I was living in Tampa, Fla. The high-water mark came in my second night on stage at the Improv in Ybor City. I won a newcomer contest, $100 for five minutes, and told my wife I thought maybe I could do that for a career. She informed me I was, in fact, incorrect."
