= George Grande =

American sportscaster (born 1947)

George Grande (born 1947) (pronounced like the English word "grand") is an American sportscaster who is a former broadcaster for the Cincinnati Reds of Major League Baseball.

Grande is also famous for having hosted the first broadcast of SportsCenter on ESPN in 1979.

== Early life and career ==
Grande graduated from the University of Southern California in 1969, where he played baseball for four years and was a member of the Trojans' team that won the 1968 College World Series. While at USC, he played with 14 future Major Leaguers, including Hall of Famer Tom Seaver and slugger Dave Kingman.

He began his broadcasting career as a USC student in 1967 as the sports director and news director of the university's radio station, KUSC-FM, followed by radio stints at KNX in Los Angeles; WERI in Westerly, Rhode Island, where he learned his craft from news director Steve J. Caminis; and WNHC in New Haven, Connecticut. He completed his radio broadcast career by handling the Boston Red Sox pre-game and post-game shows on WMEX. Prior to joining ESPN, Grande also served as a sportscaster at WTNH, a TV station in New Haven.

== ESPN ==
Grande and Lee Leonard were the first two people to be seen on ESPN upon its launch. After Leonard gave an introduction to viewers concerning what the network was all about, he tossed to Grande who was sitting at a desk dubbed the "ESPN Sports Center", which became the name of the fledgling network's nightly news broadcast. In the early years of the network, he served as host of the Inside Baseball weekly magazine program, which evolved into the current Baseball Tonight program on ESPN. Grande also served as one of the first hosts of ESPN’s coverage of the NFL Draft, alongside Howard Balzer and Paul Zimmerman.

== Major League Baseball play-by-play ==
Grande was a TV play-by-play announcer for Major League Baseball's New York Yankees in 1989 and 1990 and for the St. Louis Cardinals in 1991 and 1992.

He joined the Cincinnati Reds TV broadcast team and was its lead broadcaster from 1993 to 2009 for SportsChannel Cincinnati and Fox Sports Ohio. He teamed with former player Chris Welsh to form the longest-running TV broadcasting partnership in team history.

On October 4, 2009, Grande announced that he would step down after 17 seasons with the Reds, stating that he wanted to spend more time with his family. However, he has since returned for a notable number of games each season through 2018.

Grande also served as master of ceremonies for the National Baseball Hall of Fame's annual inductions for 31 years, from 1980 to 2010.

Grande is on the board of directors for USA Baseball.
