= Chris McKendry =

American sportscaster (born 1968)

Christine "Chris" McKendry
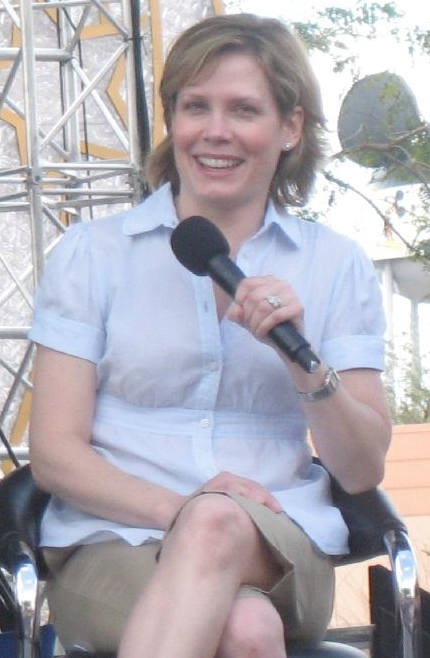
- McKendry in 2008
- Born: Christine McKendry; February 18, 1968 (age 58); Philadelphia, Pennsylvania, U.S.
- Education: Drexel University (BA 1990)
- Occupations: Television sports anchor, journalist
- Spouse: Eduardo Andrade
- Children: 2
- Awards: Regional Sports Emmy Award (1996)

Chris McKendry (born Christine McKendry; February 18, 1968) is an American journalist and television sports anchor for ESPN, where she has worked since 1996. She previously served as a long-time anchor on SportsCenter and currently works as the full-time on-site host for ESPN's tennis coverage of the Australian Open (until 2026, when she transitioned to play-by-play duties), Wimbledon, and the US Open. McKendry has the distinction of being the first woman to work as a television sports news anchor in the Washington, D.C. market and is a regional Sports Emmy Award winner.

== Early life and education ==
McKendry grew up in the Philadelphia area and attended Archbishop Ryan High School. She was a Division I scholarship tennis player at Drexel University, graduating in 1990.

== Career ==
=== Early career ===
Prior to joining ESPN, McKendry worked at WJLA-TV, an ABC affiliate in Washington, D.C., where she served as a sports reporter from 1994 to 1996. She has the distinction of being the first woman to work as a television sports news anchor in the Washington D.C. market during this period. In June 1996, she received a regional Sports Emmy in the Best Sports Segment Category for "NFL 101," which illustrated for novice fans how to watch football. While at WJLA-TV, McKendry also co-hosted Redskin Magazine, a one-hour, live pregame show.

Earlier in her career, she served as a sports anchor/reporter at All-News Channel/Conus in Minneapolis (1993–1994), an update anchor for USA Network (1993–1994) and Newsport (1994), and as a producer for Fox News Service in Washington D.C. (1992–1993).

=== ESPN ===
McKendry first anchored SportsCenter on July 27, 1996, initially shifting to ESPNEWS for the launch of the 24-hour sports news network. She returned to SportsCenter later that year, co-hosting the weekend morning and weekday 6 p.m. editions of the network's flagship news and information program.

McKendry's work beyond SportsCenter included a variety of assignments. She served as late-night host of ESPN's Wimbledon coverage in 2007 and covered the U.S. Open for SportsCenter from 2002 to 2006. She also served as co-host of ESPN's coverage of the Winter X Games, late-night host for the X Games in 1997 and 1998, and contributed to College Football Live during the 2007 season. She was the sideline reporter for ESPN, ESPN2, and ABC Sports' telecasts of the 1999 FIFA Women's World Cup, and since 2002 has hosted ESPN's coverage of the National Spelling Bee. McKendry also served as a columnist on ESPN.com's "Page Two" in 2001 and 2002.

In 1996, she was sideline and feature reporter for TNT and TBS during the NBA Playoffs.

=== Tennis coverage ===
McKendry co-anchored her final SportsCenter broadcast on March 31, 2016, and transitioned to cover tennis full-time for ESPN, beginning with the Australian Open in January and the U.S. Open in late summer. She serves as full-time on-site host for ESPN tennis coverage of the Australian Open (until 2026), Wimbledon, and the US Open.

== Personal life ==
McKendry is married to Eduardo Andrade. They have two sons.
