= Bob Ley =

American sports anchor and reporter (born 1955)

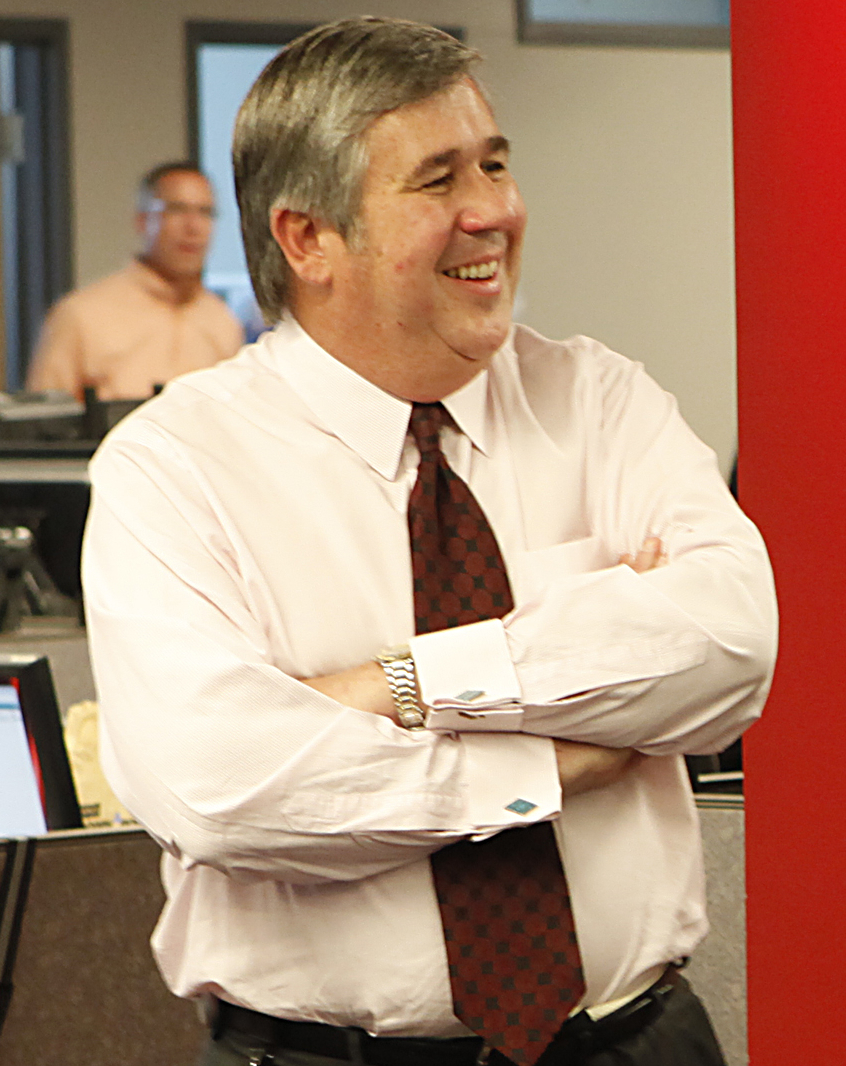
- Ley in 2010
- Born: March 16, 1955 (age 71); Newark, New Jersey, U.S.
- Education: Seton Hall University (BA)
- Employer: ESPN (1979–2019)
- Known for: Outside the Lines host, SportsCenter anchor, soccer broadcaster
- Spouse: Barbara Ley
- Children: 2

Robert A. Ley (/liː/ LEE; born March 16, 1955) is an American retired sports anchor and reporter, best known for his work at ESPN. A multiple Emmy Award-winner, he was the longest-tenured on-air employee of the network, having joined ESPN just three days after the network's 1979 launch and retiring from the network effective at the end of June 2019.

== Early life and education ==
Ley was born in Newark, New Jersey. He grew up in Bloomfield, New Jersey, where he attended Bloomfield High School. He got his start in broadcasting as a sportscaster and program director at WSOU at Seton Hall University, and interned as a production staffer at WOR-AM in New York City. After graduating magna cum laude with a Bachelor of Arts degree in Communications, Ley worked several minor broadcasting jobs, including public address announcer with the New York Cosmos soccer team, before landing his first major position with ESPN just three days after the network's launch in 1979.

== Career ==
In the mid to late 1970s, Bob was Sports Director at Suburban Cablevision TV3 out of East Orange, New Jersey, where he hosted an award-winning local-oriented sports show, Time In, alongside Bruce Beck, who would move on to WNBC, Channel 4 in New York. Ley joined ESPN on September 9, 1979. In 1980, he hosted the first televised NCAA Selection Show, though the airing would switch to CBS two years later. Starting in 1990, Ley hosted ESPN's investigative program Outside the Lines. He hosted SportsCenter for much of his career at ESPN, and on August 9, 2004, he hosted an "old school" edition with longtime broadcasting partner Charley Steiner.

Ley was the primary studio host for ESPN's telecasts of major international professional soccer tournaments, including the 2010 FIFA World Cup, the 2011 FIFA Women's World Cup, the 2012 UEFA European Championship and the 2016 UEFA European Championship. During the Night of 1000 Stars, Grantland.com's Men in Blazers, Michael Davies and Rog Bennett, presented Ley with the first Men In Blazers Golden Blazer for lifetime services to American soccer. During the presentation of the Golden Blazer, the Men in Blazers showed footage of Ley's anchoring of SportsCenter and presenting highlights of the United States men's national soccer team qualifying for the 1990 FIFA World Cup in Italy. It was the first time the USMNT qualified for the FIFA World Cup since 1950.

On September 7, 2014, in recognition of ESPN's 35th anniversary as a cable network, he was honored as one of 19 "ESPN Originals", employees who have been with the network from the beginning. Ley took an indefinite sabbatical from his ESPN hosting duties starting on October 1, 2018. On June 26, 2019, Ley announced his retirement from ESPN, effective at the end of the month.

== Personal life ==
Ley is married to Barbara, and has two children. He serves on the board of regents for Seton Hall University.

== Honors ==
- 1987 – Bloomfield High School Athletic Hall of Fame
- 1995 – Northeastern University Center for Study of Sport and Society and School of Journalism Excellence in Sports Journalism Award
- WSOU-FM Hall of Fame Member
- Eight Sports Emmy Awards for Sports Journalism
- Three CableACE Awards for Sports Information Series
- Four CableACE Awards (with Suburban Cablevision, East Orange, New Jersey)
- 2008 – Commencement speaker for the University of Hartford (West Hartford, Connecticut)
- 2013 – Golden Blazer of Fame for services to soccer in the United States
- 2018 – Sports Emmy for Outstanding Studio Host
- 2025 – Colin Jose Media Award
