= Lee Leonard =

American television personality (1929–2018)

- Born: Maxwell Lefkowitz; April 3, 1929; New York City, New York, U.S.
- Died: December 16, 2018 (aged 89); South Orange, New Jersey, U.S.
- Occupations: Radio and TV personality
- Spouse(s): Rona Rosenberg (m. 1954; div. 1963); Salome Jens (m. 1966; div. 1973) Kelly Bishop (m. 1981)
- Children: 1

Lee Leonard (April 3, 1929 – December 16, 2018) was an American television personality who was involved in the launch of cable television networks ESPN and CNN.

== Early life ==
Leonard was born Maxwell Lefkowitz on April 3, 1929, in New York City, the son of Estelle (Cohn), a beautician, and Daniel Lefkowitz.

After graduating from DeWitt Clinton High School in the Bronx, he attended Columbia University in New York City but did not graduate.

Leonard then served in the United States Army in Germany during the Korean War and developed an interest in broadcasting.

He was a midday radio personality on New York's WNBC-AM (660), shortly after it launched its "Conversation Station," a talk format, in 1964. He was part of a weekday talk-variety lineup that included "Big" Wilson, Robert Alda, Mimi Benzell, Sterling Yates, Bill Mazer, Brad Crandall and Long John Nebel and hosted a competition/quiz show for listeners called Fortune Phone.

== At CBS and NBC ==
In the early 1970s, Leonard was part of an even earlier network TV innovation, partnering on CBS-TV with Jack Whitaker on The NFL on CBS, a studio-based show wrapping around the network's coverage of the National Football League with pregame features and halftime and postgame highlights from around the league. As producers changed, Leonard and Whitaker were eventually succeeded by The NFL Today with Brent Musburger, Phyllis George, Jimmy "The Greek" Snyder and Irv Cross on one of network TV sports' longest-running studio-based programs. The core of the team would stay until the mid-1980s, while the show itself has aired continuously ever since, except for several years in the 1990s when CBS did not have NFL television rights.

As for Leonard, he would move to NBC and be teamed with Bryant Gumbel on its GrandStand show, where he would stay until just before ESPN was launched. Also during the mid-1970s, Leonard hosted Midday Live, the daily talk show on WNEW-TV (now WNYW) in New York City (he was replaced by Bill Boggs). While at WNEW, Leonard was one of the original co-hosts with Bill Mazer of Sports Extra – considered a pioneering show for the Sunday Evening Sports Wrap-Up show format.

== At ESPN and CNN ==
On September 7, 1979, Leonard was the first person to ever speak on ESPN. He gave a brief introduction before the network aired its first program, which was the first edition of SportsCenter. Afterwards, he made occasional appearances on the show.

A year later (1980), Leonard moved to CNN, where he hosted People Tonight, the network's first Los Angeles–based live entertainment news talk show. Many of today's major name celebrities made their first national talk show appearances on People Tonight, including Tom Cruise, Tom Hanks and Pee-wee Herman. The show was groundbreaking in its coverage of Hollywood red carpet premieres and many important breaking stories including the deaths of John Lennon and Natalie Wood. Robin Leach cut his teeth as a New York–based correspondent before signing on to do Entertainment Tonight and later launching the pop culture hit series, Lifestyles of the Rich and Famous. In the mid-to-late 1980s, Leonard co-hosted CNN's weekday entertainment-news program "Showbiz Today" with Liz Wickersham.

== Later career ==
From 1996 to approximately 2002, Lee Leonard hosted Jersey's Talking on News 12 New Jersey. Leonard also hosted a public affairs program on the New Jersey–based cable network CN8.

== Personal life ==
Leonard was married to actress Kelly Bishop, who played Emily Gilmore on the CW show Gilmore Girls as well as Marjorie Houseman in Dirty Dancing. He was married twice previously, including once to actress Salome Jens. He had one daughter. He died in South Orange, New Jersey, on December 16, 2018 after a long fight with cancer.
