= Kit Hoover =

American broadcast journalist

- Born: Catherine Hoover; July 29, 1970 (age 56); Atlanta, Georgia, U.S.
- Occupations: Television host, television personality, actress, journalist
- Years active: 1995–present
- Notable credit: Access Hollywood
- Spouse: Crowley Sullivan (m. 1999; separated 2024)
- Children: 3

Catherine "Kit" Hoover (born July 29, 1970) is an American television host, sportscaster and broadcast journalist. She is best known for her work in the Access Hollywood franchise, including as an anchor of Access Hollywood and a co-host of Access Daily; both programs ended in September 2026.

Earlier in her career, Hoover worked for Fox News and ESPN, including as a co-host of ESPN2's Cold Pizza and as a judge on Dream Job. She has also been a correspondent for the TV Guide Channel, a guest co-host on The View, and a host of Shaq Vs..

== Early life ==
Hoover attended Marist School in Dunwoody, Georgia. In a 2011 interview with Runner's World, Hoover said that she won both the mile and two-mile events at the Georgia state meet in three consecutive years, for six state titles in total. Marist lists Hoover, a member of its class of 1988, among former school athletes who went on to compete in college. In 2022, the school named her its Distinguished Alumni Award recipient.

Hoover earned a Bachelor of Arts in journalism from the University of North Carolina at Chapel Hill. She later said that she had also run competitively while in college and continued running throughout her adult life.

== Career ==
Hoover made her television debut as a cast member on the first season of MTV's Road Rules in July 1995, a reality television series that followed five strangers traveling across the United States in a recreational vehicle. The following year, she and fellow cast member Mark Long hosted the direct-to-video MTV's Road Rules Travel Guide: Tripping the Americas. Following Road Rules, Hoover was hired as an entertainment correspondent for the nationally syndicated magazine show American Journal. A Fox News biography published in 2003 states that Hoover joined the network in 1998 as a correspondent for the Fox Broadcasting Company newsmagazine FOX Files; later NBCUniversal and trade biographies have dated the start of her Fox tenure to 1999. At Fox, she was also an entertainment correspondent and co-host of Celebrity Spotlight. She also worked as a correspondent for The Pulse and hosted FOX Rules with Kit Hoover.

In 2003, Hoover joined ESPN as co-host of ESPN2's live morning show Cold Pizza. The program debuted on October 20, 2003, with Hoover and Jay Crawford as its principal co-hosts. She conducted interviews and presented features and highlights on the weekday program. During her ESPN tenure, Hoover was reported to have covered the 2004 Summer Olympics, Super Bowl XXXVIII, Super Bowl XXXIX, the 2004 NBA Finals, the 2003 World Series and the 2004 World Series. Beginning in 2004, she also worked as a feature and field reporter at tennis events including the Australian Open, Wimbledon and the French Open, focusing on features and interviews away from the court. In March 2005, Hoover and fellow Cold Pizza personality Thea Andrews left their regular roles on the program, with Dana Jacobson taking over hosting duties.

Hoover continued with ESPN in other roles, including as a judge on the reality competition Dream Job. Contemporary coverage identified her as one of the judges during the first season, and ESPN later described the series as having run for three seasons. Trade coverage later described Hoover as having worked for ESPN as a correspondent and Dream Job host through 2006. Hoover left ESPN in September 2006.

Hoover served as a correspondent for the TV Guide Channel from 2006 to 2008. On July 27, 2008, Hoover hosted Six Flags TV at multiple Six Flags theme parks around the United States. She hosted TLC's lifestyle makeover series Real Simple. Real Life. in 2008 and 2009. In 2010, she served as a host on the second season of Shaquille O'Neal's ABC reality program Shaq Vs., alongside Mike Goldberg. In 2014, she hosted the Lifetime series Celebrity Home Raiders, in which celebrities offered personal belongings for auction to benefit charities.

On September 13, 2010, Hoover became co-host of Access Hollywood Live with Billy Bush. She subsequently worked across the Access franchise, including the flagship Access Hollywood; by 2019, she was one of its anchors and co-hosted the daytime program then known as Access Live with Scott Evans. Later that year, Mario Lopez joined Hoover and Evans as a host of Access Hollywood and the renamed Access Daily. Hoover also co-hosted the franchise's half-hour companion program All Access from 2019 until its cancellation in 2021. Hoover and other Access hosts received Daytime Emmy Award nominations, including for Outstanding Informative Talk Show Host in 2018 and Outstanding Daytime Personality - Daily in 2025 and 2026. In 2024, Hoover launched the interview podcast The Coop with Kit. NBCUniversal announced in March 2026 that Access Hollywood and its daytime counterpart would end that September; the final week of the flagship program included a September 10 retrospective marking 30 years of Access.

== Personal life ==
Hoover married sports executive Crowley Sullivan in August 1999. They have three children, two daughters and a son. The couple separated on May 1, 2024. Hoover filed for divorce in Los Angeles County Superior Court on March 26, 2025, citing irreconcilable differences. Reporting in August 2026 continued to describe the divorce as ongoing.

Hoover enjoys fitness and exercising, especially running, which she has described as a regular part of her life since childhood. She has discussed exercise as a way of managing stress in Woman's World. She has been featured on the cover of Woman's World magazine and has shared health and running tips in publications including Self and Women's Health. In April 2020, she was named Women's Health magazine's "Mom Crush" and shared tips on how she stays active.

== Filmography ==
=== As a television host and personality ===
Television
Year	Title	Role	Notes
1995	Road Rules	Participant	First season
1996	MTV's Road Rules Travel Guide: Tripping the Americas	Co-host	Television special
1996–98	American Journal	Correspondent	
1998–2003	Fox Files	Correspondent	Fox's 2003 biography dates her start to 1998; later biographies use 1999.
1999	Full Nelson	Correspondent	
2001	Fox Rules with Kit Hoover	Host	
2002	The Pulse	Correspondent	
2003	The View	Guest host	
2003–05	Cold Pizza	Co-host	
2004–06	Dream Job	Judge	
2008–09	Real Simple. Real Life.	Co-host	
2010	Shaq Vs.	Co-host and sideline reporter	3 episodes
2010–19	Access Hollywood Live / Access Live	Co-host	Premiered September 13, 2010.
2014	Celebrity Home Raiders	Host	Lifetime series
2015	Sweat INC.	Guest judge	
2015–16	Celebrity Name Game	Celebrity player	6 episodes
2019–21	All Access	Co-host	
2019–26	Access Hollywood	Anchor	
2019	2020 Miss America Competition	Co-host	Television special
2019–26	Access Daily	Co-host	Previously titled Access Hollywood Live and Access Live.
2024	The Wager	Contestant	Episode: "Kit Hoover and Colton Underwood"

=== As an actress ===
Film and television
Year	Title	Role	Notes
2000	The Guiding Light	Reporter	Episode: "Episode dated 14 December 2000"
2015	Alvin and the Chipmunks: The Road Chip	Access Hollywood Anchor	Film
2015	Donny!	Kit Hoover	Episodes: "Boom Boom Abs!" and "Little League Dads Gone Wild!"
2018	Nashville	Kit Hoover	Episode: "For the Sake of the Song"
2020	Feliz NaviDAD	Laurel-Ann	Lifetime television film
2024	Girls5eva	Kit Hoover	Episode: "Cleveland"
2024	Mr. Throwback	Kit Hoover	Episode: "The Only Way Out Is Through"
2025	The Studio	Access Hollywood Reporter	Episode: "The Golden Globes"
