= List of personalities on Sporting News Radio =

This is a List of personalities on Sporting News Radio regarding American radio sports announcers for Sporting News Radio.

== Current ==
- Troy Aikman: Host, The Troy Aikman Show (?-present)
- Bob Berger: Host, Sports Saturday and Sports Sunday (?-present)
- Tim Brando: Host, The Tim Brando Show (?-present)
- Leslie Rolfe: Host, The Coach Les Show (2016–present)
- Dave Denicke: Host, SNR Sports Nightly (2008–present)
- Jason Goch: Update Anchor, (?-present)
- Jon Jeffries: Update Anchor, (?-present)
- Randall Mell: Contributor, Nationwide Golf Exchange (?-present)
- Tim Montemayor: Host, The Tim Montemayor Show (?-present)
- Tim Rosaforte: Contributor, Nationwide Golf Exchange (?-present)
- Brad Sham: Contributor, The Troy Aikman Show (?-present)
- Bob Shelton: Host, Sports Saturday and Sports Sunday (?-present)
- Arnie Spanier: Host, The Arnie Spanier Show (?-present)
- Matt Spiegel: Host, SNR Pregame and Fantasy Source (?-present)
- David Stein: Host, The David Stein Show (2005–present)
- Turk Stevens: Update Anchor (?-present)
- Doug Stewart: Host, 2 Live Stews (2008–present)
- Ryan Stewart: Host, 2 Live Stews (2008–present)
- Mark Wood: Host, Nationwide Golf Exchange (?-present)
- Todd Wright: Host, Todd Wright Tonight (2006–present)

== Former ==
- Johnny Renshaw: The Freak
- Rick Ballou: Host, The Rick Ballou Show (2000-2006)
- Tony Bruno: Host, The Tony Bruno Show (?-2008)
- James Brown: Host, The James Brown Show (?-2006, remains on as "special contributor")
- Papa Joe Chevalier: Host, "The Papa Joe Show" (-2005), went into independent syndication from KENO for a time. Died in 2011.
- Chet Coppock, host of the weekend Coppock on Sports (2000-2006)
- Elizabeth Hess: Host, Murray in the Morning (2004-2005)
- Bruce Jacobs: Host, "The Men's Room" with himself and Scott Wetzel: (1999-2001)
- Bob Kemp: Host, The Bob Kemp Show
- Bill Lekas: Host, The Morning Show (?-2007)
- Dan Manucci: Host, Calling All Sports with Roc & Manuch (2008-2008)
- Jay Mariotti: Host, Jay Marriotti Show with Jim Litke (?-2002)
- Andy Masur: Update Anchor, (?-1999)
- Mike Muraco: Host, Calling All Sports with Roc & Manuch (2008-2008)
- Bruce Murray: Host, Murray in the Morning (2002-2005)
- Chris Russell: Host, Russell Mania (?-2007)
- Doug Russell (sportscaster): Host, Reporter, and SportsFlash Anchor (2000-2007, 2011)
- Dave Smith: Host, The Dave Smith Show (2006-2008)
- Mark Vasko: Update Anchor, Reporter, Fill-In Talk Host (1998-1999)(2006-2008)
- Scott Wetzel: Host/Update anchor (?-2005?), has done occasional substitute work for the network since his departure
- Mark Willard: Co-Host, The Tony Bruno Show (?-2008)
