= 1st and 10 (2003 TV series) =

- Starring: Jay Crawford; Dana Jacobson; Skip Bayless guest panelists
- Country of origin: United States

Production
- Running time: 30 minutes

Original release
- Network: ESPN (2003–2008); ESPN2 (2008–2011)
- Release: October 20, 2003 – August 2011

1st and 10 was a sports talk and debate television program spun off from ESPN2's Cold Pizza morning show.

It began as a segment which ran every in 20 minute intervals during Cold Pizza, a two-hour program broadcast on the American cable television network ESPN2, each weekday morning. It first aired at 7 AM, then moved to 8 before settling in at 10:00 AM and noon ET and later became a standalone program on ESPN2 at 2:30 PM each afternoon. Brian Donlon was the original executive producer of both Cold Pizza and 1st & 10.

== History ==
The program is hosted by Jay Crawford and features a sports columnist Skip Bayless. Woody Paige, another columnist, was a founding co-host, but left the show before the move to Connecticut to return to his writing duties at the Denver Post. Dana Jacobson, First Take co-host, takes over the segments (and the spin-off show) when Crawford is away.

Guest hosts, in place of either Jacobson or Crawford, have included Josh Elliott, Tom Rinaldi, Michael Kim, Michelle Bonner, Sage Steele and Bayless himself. (On the show Bayless hosted, the brothers who make up the 2 Live Stews, Doug and Ryan Stewart, were on either side of him.)

On May 7, 2007, the program moved to ESPN's headquarters in Bristol, Connecticut, from its previous location in New York City. There have been occasional on-location segments as well.

During the show or segment, Bayless and another panelist discuss and debate ten items of significant sports news daily, with the full program ultimately divided into four segments, termed, as in American football, whence comes also the program's title, downs. Viewer e-mail is often read at the beginning of each segment and incorporated into discussion.

Crawford joined ESPN as co-host of Cold Pizza in 2003 having previously served as director of sports programming at WFTS-TV in Tampa, Florida. Paige, having frequently been a panelist on ESPN's Around the Horn while on the staff of the Denver Post, for which he had worked for more than thirty years, left the Post in 2004 to become a full-time employee of ESPN; however, he left the show on November 28, 2006, to return to the Post. Bayless, formerly a columnist for the Dallas Morning News, Miami Herald, and San Jose Mercury News, also left print journalism to join ESPN in 2004.

Since Paige left the show in December 2006 to return to Denver, Colorado, Bayless has been joined by a different guest panelist, whose run on the show has usually lasted for a week. The change affects both the main and spin-off programs. When the move to Bristol was originally announced, Bayless was no longer to be a regular on the show. Instead, he was to be part of a rotating group that will also include Patrick McEnroe, Stephen A. Smith, and Jemele Hill. However, Bayless has continued to be on the show every day since the move (except for vacation periods), and the basic format has not changed.

On August 11, 2008, the show moved to ESPN2 because ESPN unveiled its new live SportsCenter block in the mid-morning and afternoon.

In August 2011, parent show First Take underwent a drastic format change. Gone were the 1st and 10 segments, replaced with a more pronounced role for Skip Bayless. The show greatly increased the amount of debate segments, dropping the 1st and 10 name altogether and using the First Take name throughout.

In August 2011, ESPN rolled out a 1st and 10 podcast, featuring all of the debate topics condensed into a downloadable audio file. On September 13, 2011, the podcast was renamed the First Take podcast, effectively rendering 1st and 10 defunct.

== Comparisons to other ESPN talk shows ==
The show was similar in format to ESPN's other afternoon sports talk programs Jim Rome Is Burning, Around the Horn, and Pardon the Interruption.

What made the show different from others was its use of two panelists who talk about topics without any scoring system (as on Horn) or set amount of time given to a topic (PTI). Also, there are no "theme" segments or interviews with athletes and celebrities (several of the other shows), nor do either of the panelists face "elimination" at the end of a segment (also a feature of Horn).

== Guest panelists ==
=== Since Paige's departure ===
(In order of debut appearance)

==== First appeared in 2006 or 2007 ====
- Roy S. Johnson, Sports Illustrated
- Marty McNeal, Sacramento Bee
- Mark Cannizzaro, New York Post
- Jay Feely, NFL placekicker. He made his debut as a member of the New York Giants and has since played for the Miami Dolphins and New York Jets (current team in 2008).
- Tony Massarotti, Boston Herald
- 2 Live Stews (Doug and Ryan Stewart)
- Ray Buchanan, former NFL cornerback and Cold Pizza contributor
- Patrick McEnroe, former tennis pro and current TV analyst
- Chris Broussard, NBA beat writer for ESPN The Magazine
- Rob Parker, Detroit News
- Pat Forde, ESPN.com
- Kordell Stewart, former NFL quarterback
- Greg Anthony, ESPN NBA analyst
- Tim Smith, New York Daily News
- Damon Hack, The New York Times
- Jemele Hill, ESPN.com
- Lorenzo Neal, fullback for the San Diego Chargers
- Howard Bryant, The Washington Post
- Gene Wojciechowski, ESPN.com/ESPN The Magazine
- Jeffri Chadiha, ESPN The Magazine
- Jalen Rose, shooting guard for the NBA's Phoenix Suns
- Donnie Wahlberg, actor
- Lomas Brown, former NFL offensive tackle (once by himself, once in a joint appearance with Buchanan)
- Doug Gottlieb, ESPN college basketball analyst
- Jason Smith, ESPN Radio overnight host
- Sean Salisbury, former NFL quarterback and ESPN NFL analyst
- LZ Granderson, ESPN The Magazine
- Marcellus Wiley, former NFL defensive lineman

==== First appeared or returned in 2008 ====
- Shaun King, former NFL quarterback
- Donovan McNabb, Philadelphia Eagles quarterback
- Israel Gutierrez, Miami Herald
- Erik Kuselias, ESPN Radio
- Scoop Jackson, ESPN.com
- Marcos Bretón, Sacramento Bee
- Damon Jones, NBA free agent guard; Jones was traded from the Cleveland Cavaliers to the Milwaukee Bucks only hours after his debut in July 2008, then was granted his release on September 29
- Bobby Carpenter, Dallas Cowboys linebacker
- Cris Carter, former NFL wide receiver
- Jamal Anderson, former NFL running back
- Nelly, rapper

==== First appeared in 2009 ====
- Lil Wayne, rapper
- Nelly, rapper
- Chad Ochocinco, NFL wide receiver
- Bow Wow, rapper
- Andre Iguodala, NBA Player
- Stephen Bardo, former college basketball player for the University of Illinois at Urbana–Champaign and current ESPN analyst, author and motivational speaker
- Jean-Jacques Taylor, columnist for the Dallas Morning News
- Wale, rapper

==== After 2009 ====
- Terrell Suggs, NFL Outside Linebacker, Baltimore Ravens
- Mark Cuban, Owner of NBA Team Dallas Mavericks

=== Before Paige's departure ===
- Doug Gottlieb
- Stephen A. Smith
- Erik Kuselias
- Michael Irvin
