= Thea Andrews =

Canadian journalist and TV personality (born 1973)

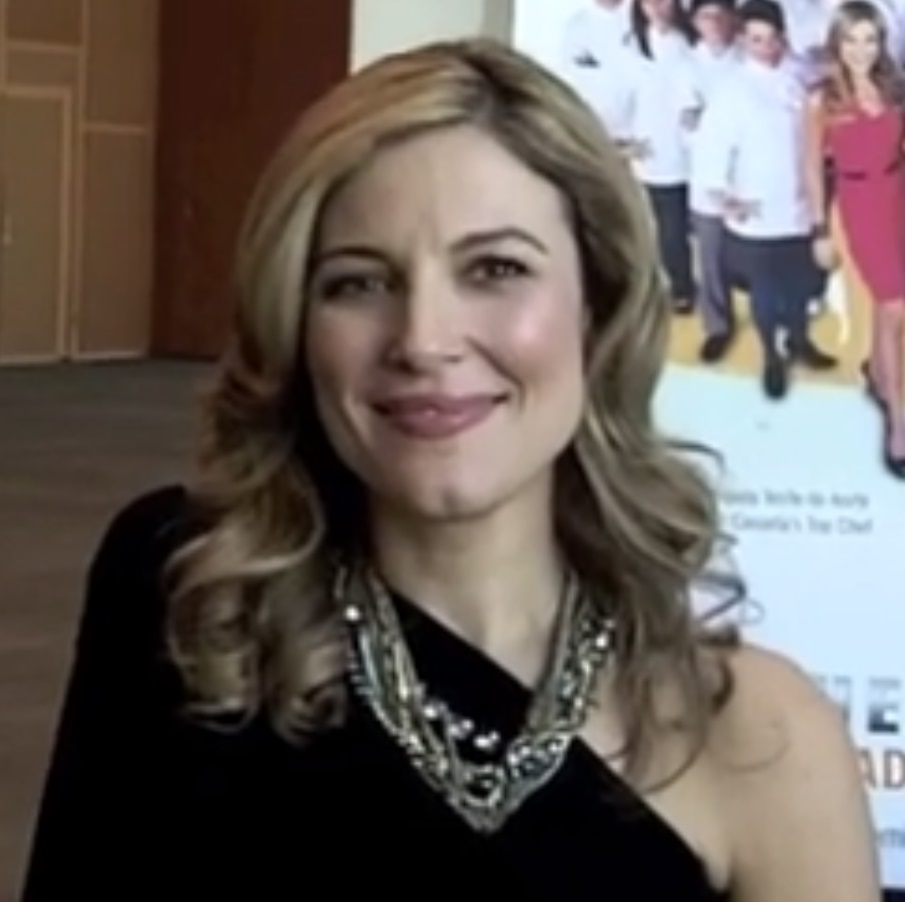
- Andrews discusses Top Chef Canada in 2011
- Born: October 4, 1973 (age 53); Toronto, Ontario, Canada
- Education: Bishop Strachan School; Queen's University
- Occupations: Journalist, TV personality
- Years active: 1992–present
- Known for: Former host of eTalk
- Spouse: Jay Wolf (m. 2007)

Thea Andrews (born October 4, 1973) is a Canadian journalist, sports and entertainment television personality, and reality competition and morning show host. From October 2003 to July 2006, she served as co-host on several ESPN shows such as Cold Pizza (2003–2005), Breakfast at Churchill Downs (2004–2006), Breakfast at Pimlico (2004–2006), The ESPY Red Carpet Show (2005–2006), ESPN Hollywood (2005–2006) and Sports and Hollywood (2006). Andrews reported on horse racing, college basketball and college football for the network.

She used to host a Saturday night counter-programming block against Hockey Night in Canada called Guys TV on TSN, and a Canadian cable show titled Cooking for Love. She was a correspondent and host on Entertainment Tonight from November 2006 to October 2009. Andrews hosted the first season of Top Chef Canada and Nigel Lythgoe's country music singing competition, CMT's Next Superstar. From January 2013 to July 2015, she co-hosted The Insider.

== Early life ==
Andrews was born in Toronto, Ontario to a Canadian businesswoman and a Macedonian lawyer. She attended Bishop Strachan School and was originally a "jock" before opting for theatre instead. A reporter for a local cable channel as a sophomore, Andrews starred in Prom Night IV: Deliver Us from Evil in 1992. After high school, she attended Queen's University and graduated with a degree in Spanish and Latin American studies. While at Queen's University Andrews co-hosted (with Cameron Dixon) Paradigm Shift, a weekly half-hour series which highlighted the works of Queen's University's Film Department.

== Career ==
By 1999, Andrews was a producer at FashionTelevision. The new millennium found her as host of the show Cooking for Love. Soon, she was hosting Guy's TV on TSN. Though both were canceled, Andrews continued to pursue her dreams. She became a reporter on the show etalk Daily and eventually the show's host.

=== Acting career ===
Andrews also has a list of theatre credits, including Cabaret in high school and The Vagina Monologues in 2001. She has also produced several shows in addition to writing internet columns for TSN. Andrews had a small role in the film Harold & Kumar Go to White Castle as the TV anchorwoman.

Andrews has also been featured as herself on the daytime drama The Young and the Restless and has played herself several times on HBO's True Blood.

=== ESPN/ESPN2/ABC Sports ===
Before her part on Cold Pizza, Andrews was seen in the ESPN series Playmakers (2003), in which she played the role of Samantha Lovett, a television sports news reporter. The role was highly controversial and The Association for Women in Sports Media formally filed a complaint for the portrayal of Lovett. Andrews disagreed with this complaint in an interview with The Plain Dealer in 2004.

Andrews joined ESPN in October 2003 as the national correspondent for Cold Pizza (2003–2005), ESPN2's signature morning show as she made her debut on October 20, 2003. Andrews' primary role on the daily weekday program (7-9 a.m. ET) was to provide live reports from sports and non-sports events as well as to present unique lifestyle features. The show was originally hosted by Jay Crawford and Kit Hoover. Eventually, Andrews became co-host.

From 2004 to 2006, she co-hosted the Triple Crown morning shows on ESPN2 such as Breakfast at Churchill Downs (2004–2006) and Breakfast at Pimlico (2004–2006), a program of the morning the Kentucky Oaks, Kentucky Derby and Preakness Stakes (2004–2006). She also contributed to ESPN's long extensive coverage of the Triple Crown afternoon shows (2004–2006) including the Belmont Stakes. She served as a reporter for the Breeders Cup Simulcast Show in 2004 and 2005.

After 17 months on Cold Pizza, the show began cutting both the airtime of Andrews and Kit Hoover. In an attempt to become more sports-oriented rather than a blend of sports, pop culture, and entertainment, the show dropped Andrews and Hoover altogether in March 2005. They were replaced by Dana Jacobson. While Hoover left the network in late 2006, Andrews had already agreed several months prior to being transferred to Los Angeles to co-host ESPN2's new evening entertainment show, ESPN Hollywood.

She also co-hosted The ESPY Red Carpet Show (2005–2006) with Stuart Scott in July 2005. She hosted it in July 2006 with Dana Jacobson. Andrews reported the sidelines for college football on ESPN and ABC.

Beginning on August 15, 2005, Mario Lopez and Andrews began hosting ESPN Hollywood (2005–2006). ESPN Hollywood was a weeknight entertainment show à la Entertainment Tonight which focused more on Hollywood's relationship to the sports world. Andrews also was the producer for ESPN Hollywood. The show would be cancelled in January 2006 after a management change at ESPN in which several shows were cancelled (Cheap Seats, Classic Now, etc.) and also due to poor initial ratings.

After ESPN Hollywood was cancelled, Andrews briefly hosted a segment of the latest news of the convergence between the sports and entertainment worlds called Sports and Hollywood (2006), a segment on Cold Pizza which began in April 2006. The tightened focus on sports news resulted in an end to that segment; however, actors and other performers still stopped by the Cold Pizza studios from time to time to pitch their projects and share their love of sports.

Also after ESPN Hollywood, Andrews often reported from the sidelines for College basketball for ABC Sports and ESPN and also covered Golf for ESPN. She was a contributor to ABC Sports' coverage of the 2006 Belmont Stakes.

=== Entertainment Tonight ===
On November 16, 2006, Andrews made her debut as a correspondent on Entertainment Tonight (ET) that is where she continued to work until October 2009. She was also a regular substitute host for the show as well. She also was the weekend host of ET.

Since joining Entertainment Tonight in November 2006, Andrews has interviewed many of the industry's most newsworthy celebrities, including Will Smith, Leonardo DiCaprio, Steve Carell, Hugh Jackman, Tom Cruise, Jim Carrey, Russell Crowe, Reese Witherspoon, Jennifer Aniston, Anne Hathaway, Kirk Douglas, Marie Osmond, and Ellen DeGeneres.

=== TNT/After ET ===
On January 23, 2010, Andrews became co-host for the "16th Annual Screen Actors Guild Awards" Red Carpet Show for TNT with People deputy managing editor Peter Castro. She was the host of the first season of Top Chef Canada, which premiered on April 11, 2011. She stepped down as host for the second season because she was nine months pregnant during taping and was replaced by actress Lisa Ray.

=== CMT's Next Superstar ===
Andrews was the host of CMT's Next Superstar, a reality competition series specializing in country music, which is produced by Nigel Lythgoe.

=== Top Chef Canada ===
Andrews was named as the host of Top Chef Canada in 2010.
