= Red Rowdies =

Group of fans of the Houston Rockets

The Red Rowdies are a group of fans of the Houston Rockets basketball team.

Before the start of the 2006-07 season, Rockets head coach Jeff Van Gundy held auditions to find what he deemed the most rabid fans of the team. The Rowdies get their own section at Toyota Center during home games. Van Gundy even offered to pay the fans' season tickets. The coach was responding, in part, to the team's 15–26 home record in the 2005-06 season; the Rockets were 28–13 at home in 2006–07.

The participants in the original tryout, held in late August 2006, were asked to show off why they were greatest Rockets fan. Entertainment ranged from speeches, scream shows, and re-enactments of the greatest moments in Rockets history to singing, running, and Indian, Hoola, and break dancing. Judges consisted of members of the Rockets organization and household radio names, such as Matt Jackson of Sportsradio 610.

In all, 32 Rowdies were selected from the first tryout. Two of them, Corry Worrell and Brandon Pittman, were guests on ESPN2's Cold Pizza on December 5, 2006.

The Rowdies made so much noise in the preseason that Rockets superstar Tracy McGrady decided to purchase twenty more tickets. Tryouts for the second audition were held at Dave and Busters during the regular season opener against the Utah Jazz. A remarkable number of approximately 200 people showed up for the tryout, much less than the estimated 70 who showed up for the first tryout.

Rowdies were obligated to attend approximately 40 out of the 48 home games. Brandon Pittman, who appeared on ESPN's "Cold Pizza", was honored for attending every single home game.

During Game 1 of the First Round of the Western Conference playoffs, TNT Sports reporter Craig Sager joined the Rowdies in watching the Rockets take on the Utah Jazz. Throughout the season, many reporters from ESPN, TNT, and Fox, as well as several other newspaper journalists, visited the Rowdy Section 114 on the lower bowl of the Toyota Center.

The Rockets gave Van Gundy permission to start the Red Rowdies and is sanctioning the program. There is mention of the group on the official web site.

Tryouts for the second class of Rowdies were held on September 22, 2007. Rockets guard Luther Head served as one of the judges. Approximately 60 people showed up for the tryout, and a total of 40 tickets were handed away. With the departure of former head coach Jeff Van Gundy, who sponsored the first installment, Adidas picked up the sponsorship of the Rowdies for year number two. The Rockets sponsored a road-trip to San Antonio for all Rowdies on November 16, 2007, providing tickets and charter bus.

The original name of the Red Rowdies was supposed to be "Van Rowdies", named after head coach Van Gundy, but because of Van Gundy's contractual situation, and because McGrady later bought tickets, Red Rowdies it was.
