= Shae Cornette =

American sportscaster (born 1986)

- Cornette on First Take in 2026
- Born: Shae Peppler; August 20, 1986 (age 40); Chicago, Illinois, U.S.
- Other name: Shae Peppler Cornette
- Education: Indiana University
- Occupation: Sports anchor
- Television: ESPN
- Spouse: Jordan Cornette (m. 2019)
- Children: 2

Shae Cornette (née Peppler; born August 20, 1986) is an American television sports anchor who is the host of ESPN's First Take.

== Early life ==
Cornette was born and raised in Park Ridge, Illinois. She attended Indiana University Bloomington, where she developed an interest in sports broadcasting, and graduated with her degree in broadcast journalism. During college, she completed internships with MTV Networks and Showtime Networks and was a production assistant for CBS coverage of Chicago Bears games.

== Career ==
Cornette began her career in Chicago with the Big Ten Network and Chicago Huddle on WLS-TV (ABC 7). She also worked for Campus Insiders (later Stadium) and appeared on Morning Dose on WGN-TV (the CW). She spent two years with WFLD (Fox-32) as a field reporter and weekend sports anchor, most prominently as an on-site correspondent during Chicago Bears games. She also co-hosted David Kaplan's talk show on WMVP (ESPN 1000).

In March 2020, Cornette moved to Connecticut and joined her husband as the co-host of ESPN Radio's weekly football show GameDay. They were the first married couple to host an ESPN Radio show. She also became a host for SiriusXM's NFL Radio channel. In October 2021, the couple became the hosts of the relaunched daily ESPN+ TV show SportsNation. Her role at ESPN grew as she became a regular anchor for SportsCenter. In October 2025, she was named to succeed Molly Qerim as co-host of First Take starring Stephen A. Smith.

== Personal life ==
Cornette met her husband, sports announcer and former Notre Dame basketball player Jordan Cornette, while working for Campus Insiders in 2014. The couple married on June 1, 2019. She gave birth to their son, Joey (named after Jordan's late brother Joel, a former Butler basketball player), in April 2021. Their daughter, Saylor, was born in January 2023.
