= 1st & Ten =

1st & Ten, 1st and Ten, or First & Ten may refer to:

- 1st and 10, a situation in American football which occurs at first down
- 1st and 10 (2003 TV series), a 2003 sports debate program that aired on the cable television networks ESPN and ESPN2
- 1st & Ten (1984 TV series), a 1984 situation comedy that aired on the cable television network HBO
- 1st & Ten (graphics system), a television graphics technology system used during American football television broadcasts more known as the "first down line" casually
