= Cooking for Love =

Canadian dating game show

Cooking for Love was a dating game show hosted by Thea Andrews where three contestants battled to win the heart of the mystery date by preparing an impromptu dish to impress the mystery date. The chosen cook gets a date with the mystery date. It was shown on the Women's Television Network and repeats are still shown on The Cooking Channel on most Canadian television stations.
