= 7 Hudson Square =

Office skyscraper in Manhattan, New York

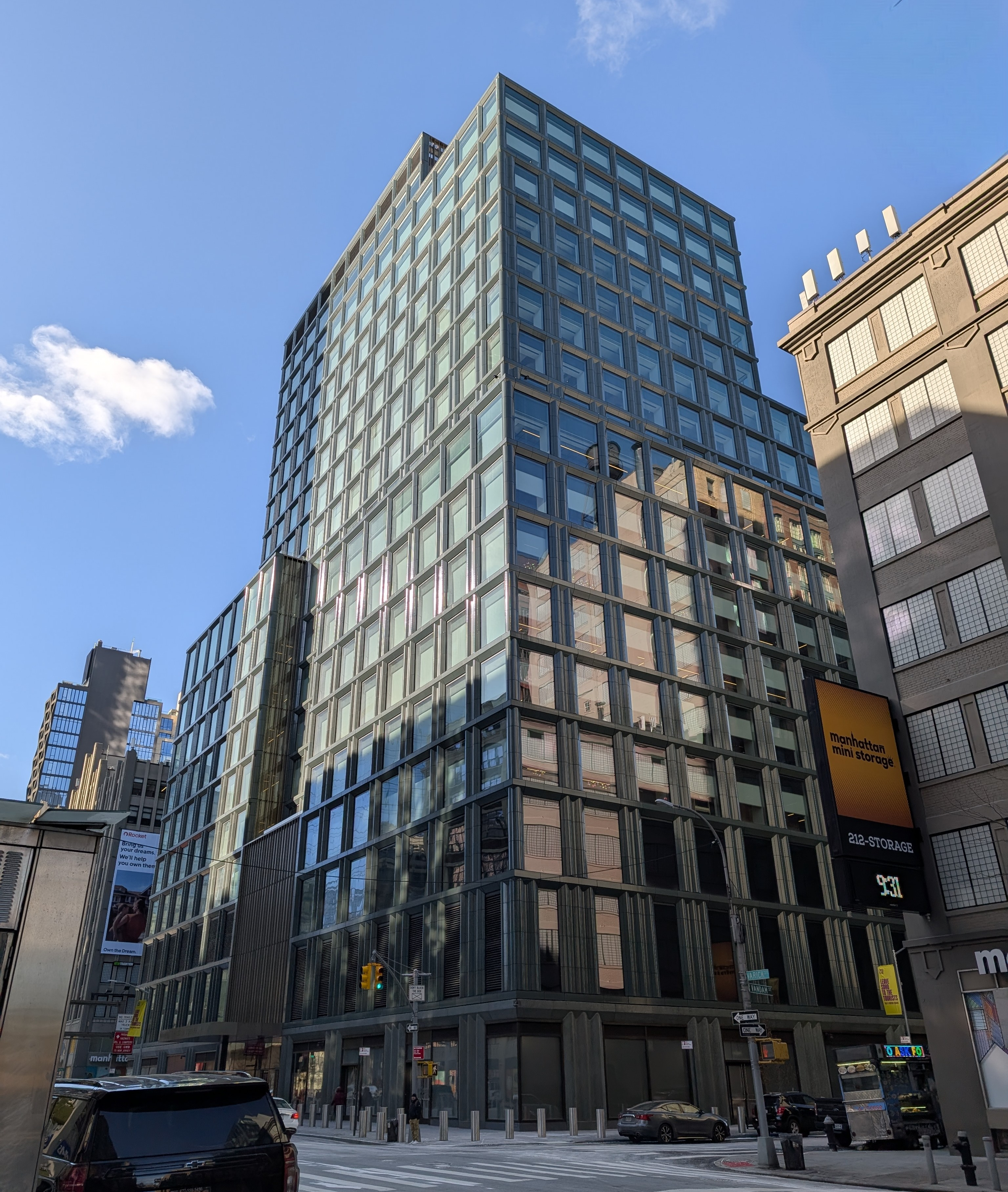
- Street angled view of 7 Hudson Square
- Alternative names: Robert A. Iger Building

General information
- Status: Completed
- Type: Office
- Architectural style: Contemporary modern
- Coordinates: 40.726185°N 74.007195°W
- Current tenants: The Walt Disney Company
- Construction started: 2020
- Opened: 2024

Height
- Roof: 338 ft (103 m)
- Top floor: 338 ft (103 m)

Technical details
- Floor count: 22
- Floor area: 1,200,000 sq ft (110,000 m^{2})

Design and construction
- Architect: SOM
- Developer: Silverstein Properties
- Structural engineer: Thornton Tomasetti
- Civil engineer: Langan
- Main contractor: Lendlease

7 Hudson Square is a 22-story, 338-foot-tall (103 m) office building in Manhattan, New York City. Completed in 2024 and designed by SOM, the contemporary terracotta building serves as the East Coast headquarters of The Walt Disney Company and several of its subsidiaries, incorporating studio facilities for ABC News, ESPN, and its flagship television station WABC-TV.

The building's official address is 137 Varick Street; its vanity address of 7 Hudson Square is in homage to WABC-TV, which broadcasts on virtual channel 7. It is also known as the Robert A. Iger Building, in honor of former Disney CEO Bob Iger. Other entrance addresses include 145 Varick Street.

== History ==
In 2018, The Walt Disney Company announced that it would move its New York offices from West 66th Street in the Upper West Side for Hudson Square, which is home to other businesses such as Google, Oscar Health, and Warby Parker. Disney signed a 99-year lease on the Hudson Square site, whose land is owned by the Trinity Church, for $650 million. The four structures previously on the site were demolished by Skanska. Architect Rafael Viñoly was one of the evicted tenants, whose business was at 50 Vandam Street since 1990. Demolition finished and excavation work started in 2020. New Hudson Facades began construction of the exterior facade in April 2021 and completed installation in the fall of 2023. Its tentative address when announced was 4 Hudson Square.

The building was completed in 2024; in September, ABC's daytime talk show The View became one of the first productions to relocate to 7 Hudson Square, the official address of the building. ABC News was projected to begin migrating its operations to the building throughout 2025; the ABC News late-night newscasts World News Now and Good Morning America First Look relocated in January, followed by WABC-TV in February, and World News Tonight in March. WABC-produced syndicated talk show Live with Kelly and Mark relocated in April, followed by New York-based editions of ABC's Sunday talk show This Week. ABC's morning show Good Morning America relocated in June, followed by ESPN's New York-based studio shows First Take, Sunday NFL Countdown and Get Up.

== Studio facilities ==
The building serves as the New York headquarters of The Walt Disney Company and several of its divisions, and consolidates the New York-based production operations of ABC News, ESPN, and its New York flagship television station WABC-TV (channel 7).

- WABC-TV (from 7 Lincoln Square)
  - Live with Kelly and Mark
  - Channel 7 Eyewitness News
- ABC News (mostly from 7 Lincoln Square)
  - Good Morning America (from Times Square Studios)
  - Good Morning America Weekend
  - GMA3 (from Times Square Studios)
  - World News Tonight
  - This Week (New York-based editions)
  - Nightline
  - 20/20
  - World News Now and Good Morning America First Look
- ESPN
  - First Take
  - Get Up
  - Sunday NFL Countdown
- The View
- Tamron Hall (from 7 Lincoln Square; shares The View's studio)

== Design and location ==
Designed by SOM and developed by Silverstein Properties, the 320-foot-tall building has a terra cotta exterior with a grid of rounded, lichen green columns, and has towers on the east and west sides. The green exterior mirrors Aldo Rossi's 2001 Scholastic Building in Soho, which also sports thick columns. All the building's windows feature Arnold Glas Isolar panels, which are designed to reduce bird–window collisions. At ground level, the southern Spring Street features an entrance hall and waiting area to accommodate studio audiences for ABC tapings so that the crowd is not exposed to the elements or crowding the sidewalks outside the building. Wide halls and large elevators help maintain crowd flow towards four underground taping facilities, engineered with Cerami & Associates, with a food court planned to serve refreshments to taping attendees. The building is lined with bollards for security and there is also 30,000 square feet of outdoor space.

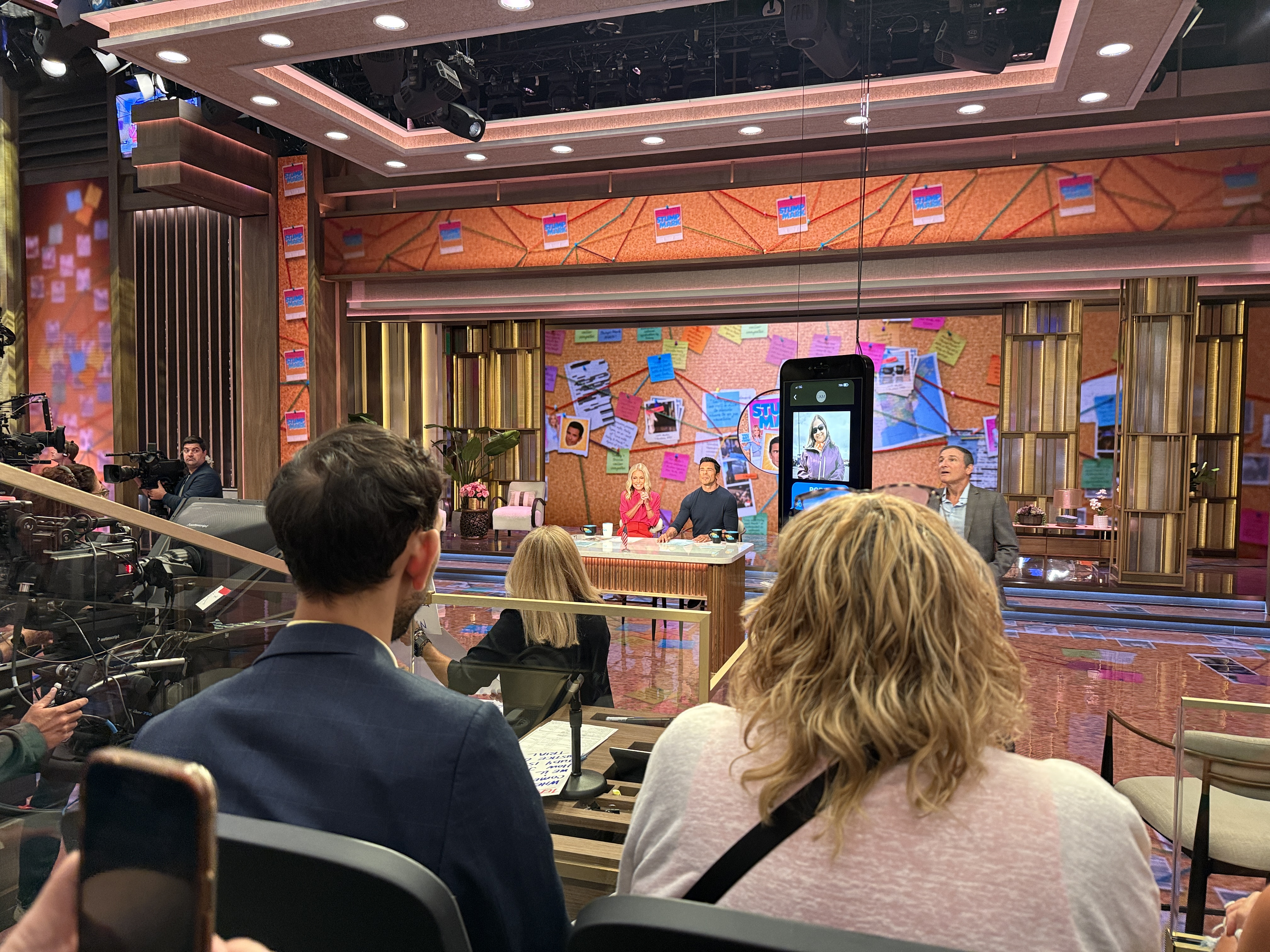
The Live with Kelly and Mark studio at 7 Hudson Square.

The building features a screening room, and a wood-paneled library and reading room with mini-exhibits of authentic artifacts from the histories of Disney, Pixar, ABC, and New York, including some from the 1964 New York World's Fair in Queens, and the cafeteria featuring reproductions of Disney's movie posters upon its walls. Sports memorabilia is housed in the reading room, and appropriate sports photography is highlighted along the walls of ESPN's floor. In the great room, there is a double-height space with louvered skylights and a wall-size screen. The hall forms a bridge between the two 19-story towers. The inspiration for the great room is cited as the Emeryville, California facility for Pixar, designed by Bohlin Cywinski Jackson.

ABC News oversaw the technical aspects of the new building in consultation with ESPN. ESPN's presence consists of three main studios; Studio 1X and 2Y are used by Get Up and First Take respectively, while Studio Q is used for ESPN Radio and podcasting, and a flex studio was allocated for New York-based contributors to other ESPN studio programs. As with its previous New York location on Pier 17, the facilities are linked to ESPN's main studios in Bristol, Connecticut over a fiber-optic network, with production conducted remotely.

The 10th floor acts as a communal space, which sits 155 feet above the ground, that also splits between the towers of the upper floors. From April 7–11, 2025, Live with Kelly and Mark broadcast from a temporary set in the space while final testing of its new studio was conducted, with segments throughout the week being used to highlight the new headquarters.

The building plans aimed to exceed the NYC energy code by at least 25 percent and to work with the Hudson Square Business Improvement District (BID) to aesthetically complement the surrounding sidewalks.

== Awards ==
- 2025 Interior Design Magazine's NYCxDESIGN Award for Creative Office
- 2025 Interior Design Magazine's Best of Year Award for Extra Large Corporate Office
- 2025 Interior Design Magazine's NYCxDESIGN Award for NYC's Shining Moment
- 2026 AIANY Design Awards, Merit Award

== See also ==
- Walt Disney Studios (Burbank)
