= 2 Live Stews =

Former American radio show

- Genre: Sports radio
- Country of origin: United States
- Language: English
- Home station: WQXI
- Hosted by: Doug Stewart; Ryan Stewart
- Produced by: Malcolm Brown; Keith Allen
- Recording studio: WQXI, Atlanta, Georgia
- Original release: 2001 – 2012
- Website: www.2livestews.com

The 2 Live Stews was an American syndicated sports talk radio show originating from WQXI (AM) 790 The Zone, in Atlanta, Georgia hosted by brothers Doug and Ryan Stewart.

== The hosts and cast ==
Both brothers were born and raised in Moncks Corner, South Carolina. Doug Stewart is a former running back at Newberry College who then transferred to South Carolina State University where he graduated. He was also a former sports agent, mortgage lender, and Foot Action USA store manager. Ryan Stewart (RJR) is a former Georgia Tech All-American and Detroit Lions football player. The brothers are members of Omega Psi Phi fraternity. The Stewart brothers both currently reside in Atlanta, and they support the local Atlanta charities, particularly Big Brothers, Big Sisters.

Quasimoto (Malcolm Brown) and Opie (Keith Allen) were the in-house producers with the Stews in Atlanta, GA. Marvin Byrd (a.k.a. Marvinsky) was the sound engineer. Kyle and Dave were the sound engineers in Houston, TX.

== History ==
Hitting the airwaves in 2001, Doug and Ryan Stewart have taken their hip hop style of sports talk from "the basement to the penthouse." Calling it a "keep it real show," the Stews try to tell the blunt, unvarnished truth, and encourage guests and callers to do the same. The show initially aired in the late evenings, was later moved to mid-days, and then the prime afternoon drive slot. Five years into their gig the 2 Live Stews had become Atlanta-based radio station 790 The Zone's highest-rated show.

In 2004, the Stews were voted "Best Air Talent of the Year" at the Sports Radio Awards presented by ESPN Radio. In 2005, The Stews signed on to do a show for ESPN2, which aired Wednesdays at 12:30am. In October 2005, after months of negotiation, the Stews announced a deal with Radio One and Reach Media to nationally syndicate their show; said deal ended with Radio One's departure from the syndication business in 2007.

On June 4, 2007, the Stews joined ESPN2's morning show First Take (formerly Cold Pizza) as regular contributors to the show. Additionally, they have done some work as analysts in the NFL Live studio.

On September 24, 2007, TV One Network signed The Stews to host Season Two of 'Black Men Revealed', the series that brings together males from all walks of life to frankly discuss and often explore the myths and truths surrounding black men.

== Future of the show ==
Original syndicator Syndication One left the syndication business in 2007; the show was subsequently picked up for a time by Sporting News Radio. The station is now off air. The Stews are not working in radio.
