= Shaq Vs. =

- Genre: Reality, Competition
- Directed by: Bob Levy
- Starring: Shaquille O'Neal
- Country of origin: United States
- Original language: English
- No. of seasons: 2
- No. of episodes: 10

Production
- Executive producers: Steve Nash; Shaquille O'Neal; Scott Messick; Perry Rogers; Trice Barto
- Running time: 60 minutes
- Production companies: Dick Clark Productions; Media Rights Capital

Original release
- Network: ABC
- Release: August 18, 2009 – August 31, 2010

Shaq Vs. is an American reality television series produced for ABC by Dick Clark Productions and Media Rights Capital starring American basketball star Shaquille O'Neal. It began airing on August 18, 2009.

Shaquille O'Neal claims to be "the greatest athlete" and challenged numerous top athletes in their own sports. It received generally negative reviews from critics.

== History/ format ==
The Washington Post has pointed out similarities to Shaq Vs. and Todd Gallagher's book Andy Roddick Beat Me with a Frying Pan saying the book and the show have "precisely the same premise" and that a TV show based on the book Gallagher was trying to sell was "the exact same show." TMZ later reported that Gallagher and O'Neal shared the same agent and the agent had previously shopped a virtually identical show with Gallagher. Gallagher's name appears in the credits of season 2 as a producer.

The Arizona Republic reported that in early 2008 Steve Nash, a former teammate of O'Neal's, had mentioned to O'Neal a reality show he was pursuing that would feature Nash taking on professional athletes in their own sport. O'Neal said Nash's idea was based on training with other athletes, not competing against them. Nash would not confirm the Republic's story and said, "We collaborated on parts of the show." Nash is an executive producer of the program.

Mike Goldberg, former play-by-play announcer for the UFC, has served as both the show's play-by-play announcer and one of the show's two co-hosts for all of its seasons. In season 1, Pat Tomasulo, sports anchor at WGN-TV, co-hosted with Goldberg while Charissa Thompson served as the sideline reporter. In season 2, Kit Hoover served as both the co-host and sideline reporter. Shaq's total record is 2 wins, 12 losses, and a tie.

The show did not return in 2011 for a third season.

== Episodes ==
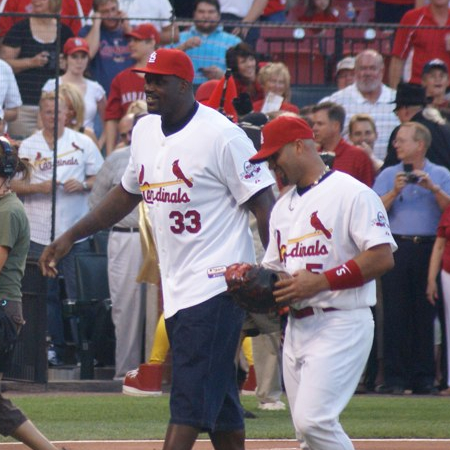
Shaq (left) threw a ceremonial first pitch to Pujols at the Busch Stadium on August 11, 2009, 2 days before a home run derby.

=== Season 1 ===
Each episode in Season 1 included preliminary challenges, banter from news conferences, and O'Neal and his rival negotiating a handicap. In each episode Shaq and his competitor do some form of charity work. Shaq mentions quite often that he loves to see the smile on the little kids' faces. The laughs come from "trash talking," but "when it comes to competing, there is no joking," O'Neal says.

No. overall	No. in season	Title	Original release date	Viewers (millions)
1	1	"Shaq vs. Ben Roethlisberger"	August 18, 2009	4.337
Shaq takes on reigning Super Bowl champ Ben Roethlisberger in a quarterback challenge. Both men train at the Pittsburgh Steelers' practice facility before taking on a traditional 7-on-7 game at Ambridge High School in Ambridge, PA. Shaq started with the ball and both scored twice to tie the game at 14 points. Shaq completed a few big plays to the endzone while Roethlisberger preferred to move the ball methodically to score. However, on Shaq's ensuing possession, he threw a pass that was intercepted in the endzone, giving Roethlisberger a chance to win on the last possession. After working the ball some, Roethlisberger completed a pass to the back of the endzone, giving him the win.: Handicap: Shaq gets to start each possession at the 20-yard line while Ben must start at the 40-yard line.; Winner: Ben Roethlisberger (Final Score: 21-14)
2	2	"Shaq vs. Misty & Kerri"	August 25, 2009	4.2
Misty May-Treanor and Kerri Walsh, Olympic gold medalists in beach volleyball, battle Shaq and his partner, Olympic gold medalist Todd Rogers and their ceremonial coach (another Olympic gold medalist) Phil Dalhausser, in a 2-on-2 match in Hermosa Beach, California. The competition consisted of a best of three sets, using rally scoring, 1st to 11 points, and a regulation net for women's beach volleyball. After Shaq lost the first set, he briefly replaced his partner Todd Rogers with Kerri Walsh's husband, Casey Jennings, in order to "get in her head". Shaq also lost the second set by a score of 11-8. Early in the show Shaq gets tips from tennis player Serena Williams on the psyche of female athletes.: Handicap: None.; Winner: Misty May-Treanor and Kerri Walsh (Final Score: 11-6, 11-8)
3	3	"Shaq vs. Albert Pujols"	September 1, 2009	3.26
Shaq challenges Albert Pujols, first baseman of the St. Louis Cardinals, to a home run derby at T. R. Hughes Ballpark in O'Fallon, Missouri.: Handicap: Shaq only has to hit the ball 250 feet to center. Pujols has to hit it 382 feet. Also, Shaq got ten outs per round, while Pujols got only five.; Winner: Albert Pujols (Final Score: 16-10)
4	4	"Shaq vs. Oscar De La Hoya"	September 8, 2009	3.85
Shaq battles championship fighter Oscar De La Hoya in a five-round sparring matchup at Planet Hollywood Resort & Casino in Paradise, Nevada.: Handicap: Both fighters wore protective headgear. Also, instead of fighting 12 three-minute rounds, they fought four two-minute rounds with a one-minute fifth round.; Winner: Oscar De La Hoya (Unanimous Decision)
5	5	"Shaq vs. Michael Phelps"	September 15, 2009	4.34
Shaq takes on Olympic gold medal swimmer Michael Phelps in a series of swimming races at Mangione Aquatic Center at Loyola University Maryland.: Handicap: Each race had its own different handicap (Race 1 - Shaq swam 25 yards while Phelps swam 50 yards with a 5-second head start; race 2 - Shaq, Dana Vollmer, Rebecca Soni, and Ariana Kukors each swam a 50 yard segment of a 200-yard medley relay, while Phelps swam an individual 200-yard medley; race 3 - Shaq swam 50 yards while Phelps swam 75 yards).; Winner: Michael Phelps (2 out of 3 races - Shaq won the first race; Phelps won the second and third races)

Final Record: 0-5

=== Season 2 ===
In February 2010, ABC announced that the series will return for a second season. Season 2 would premiere on August 3, and unlike Season 1 which relied on sporting matches, Season 2 would also feature comedic non-sports competitions such as a spelling bee, dance battle, or magic act. Shaq competes against Dale Earnhardt Jr. in a NASCAR race, track and field sprinter Tyson Gay in a race, chef and television personality Rachael Ray in a cook-off, pop musician Justin Bieber in a dance-off, Charles Barkley in a golf match, Joey Chestnut in a hot dog eating contest, national spelling bee champion Kavya Shivashankar in a spell off, Las Vegas magic duo Penn & Teller by performing classic stage-magic acts, and Shane Mosley in a boxing match.

No. overall	No. in season	Title	Original release date	Viewers (millions)
6	1	"Shaq vs. Dale Earnhardt Jr. / Shaq vs. Spelling Bee Champ"	August 3, 2010	5.44
Shaq heads to North Carolina to take on Dale Earnhardt Jr. in a head-to-head race at Concord Speedway. Guest appearance to start the race was Panthers Steve Smith. Also: a visit to Washington, D.C., to square off with National Spelling Bee Champion Kavya Shivashankar.: Spelling Bee Handicap: Shaq gets two free throws which he will ask his teammates for help.; Winner: Kavya Shivashankar, by one word (Shaq used both free throws); Race Handicap: 1st race - Shaq one lap up (5 laps total), 2nd race - Dale gets two pit stops in the race (10 laps total).; Winner: Dale Earnhardt Jr. (Won both races)
7	2	"Shaq vs. Shane Mosley / Shaq vs. Penn and Teller"	August 10, 2010	3.86
The 7-foot-1, 335-pound NBA star laces on the gloves to challenge 5-foot-9, 150-pound Shane Mosley in an exhibition boxing match in Las Vegas. Also: the big man attempts some hocus-pocus with magicians Penn and Teller. Prior to the fight, Shaq gets tips from trainer Freddie Roach.: Magic Trick Competition Handicap: Shaq gets Teller as his partner.; Winner: Penn (Shaq messed up his trick; Penn did not); Boxing Handicap: Rounds will be only 2 minutes (instead of 3), rest period will be 90 seconds (instead of 60), five rounds with the last round will only be one minute, Shaq gets to wear a lighter glove. 20-foot ring (instead of 16-foot ring) which gives Mosley room to move around.; Winner: Shane Mosley (Unanimous Decision; all three judges scored the fight 48-47)
8	3	"Shaq vs. Rachael Ray / Shaq vs. Tyson Gay"	August 17, 2010	5.07
Shaq goes shopping with Rachael Ray in New York City, where they pick up ingredients for a burger cook-off. Also: the big man gets help from Dwight Howard, Chris Johnson and DeSean Jackson in a 200-meter relay race against sprinter Tyson Gay in Los Angeles.: Cooking Handicap: Shaq declined a handicap, saying "it's just burgers." However, he received some tips from Rachael's husband.; Winner: Rachael Ray, by the score of 4-1 (Shaq did the dishes after that); Race Handicap: 1st race - Shaq on 30m mark & Tyson on 60m mark; 2nd Race - Shaq's team against Tyson team's in a 200m relay.; Winner: Tie, one race each (Shaq won the first race; Tyson won the second race)
9	4	"Shaq vs. Charles Barkley / Shaq vs. Competitive Eating"	August 24, 2010	3.96
Shaq travels to Dana Point, CA to tee off against Charles Barkley on the St. Regis Monarch Beach golf links, then heads to Las Vegas to challenge Nathan’s Famous Hot Dog Eating Champion Joey Chestnut outside Serendipity 3.: Eating Handicap: 5 minutes to eat hot dogs. Shaq gets 5 random people he pulled off the street to help him.; Winner: Shaq, by the score of 36-35 (Shaq ate the winning hot dog with 1 second left); Golf Handicap: None. Rules are 5 holes, and Shaq and Charles both get a pro golfer on their team. Shaq had Anthony Kim, and Charles had Bubba Watson.; Winner: Shaq, in a playoff (Both teams finished in 25 strokes; on the sudden-death hole, Shaq sank his 2nd shot, while Charles failed to)
10	5	"Shaq vs. Justin Bieber / Shaq vs. Jimmy Kimmel"	August 31, 2010	3.97
Shaq will take on Pop/R&B multi-platinum singing sensation Justin Bieber live and on stage in front of thousands of screaming fans in Orlando, FL. Before that, the two will face off against each other in various competitions, including a dance-off, bowling match, basketball game, and breath-holding contest. Shaq will then travel to Hollywood to issue a challenge to ABC’s late night host, Jimmy Kimmel, during his appearance on Jimmy Kimmel Live!.: Singing Handicap: None.; Winner: Justin Bieber (Won all of the competitions, except a dance battle); Comedy Handicap: Shaq gets Kimmel's sidekick, Guillermo Díaz.; Winner: Jimmy Kimmel (By audience reaction)

Final Record: 2-7-1

Overall Record: 2-12-1

== Legacy ==
=== Critical reception ===
On Rotten Tomatoes season 1 of the show has a "rotten" 33% rating. The Baltimore Sun remarked that the should have been a weekend daytime show shown on a Regional sports network rather than a primetime show. While Variety remarked that it was good idea that was terribly executed. Meanwhile, the AV Club was more positive, remarking that it was a pretty agreeable way to waste your time.

=== Later developments ===
In 2018 Shaquille O'Neal stated in an interview with TMZ sports that he "held back" in his fight with Oscar De La Hoya as he was friends with him, while he also stated that he "turned it up a little" in his fight with Mosley.
