= Todd Wright =

American sports radio personality

Todd Wright (born in Cincinnati, Ohio) is an American sports radio personality.

He founded and hosted ESPN Radio's AllNight with Todd Wright, and was a part of ESPN Radio from 1996 to 2005. Wright then took his popular national show to Sporting News Radio (later Yahoo! Sports Radio) in 2006 where it continued airing until 2012.

In addition, Wright served as host or analyst for multiple college football studio shows, general sports talk programming and Tampa Bay Rays World Series coverage on Sun Sports, a Fox Sports regional cable network in Florida, while also anchoring live tournament coverage for the PGA Tour Network and PGA Tour Entertainment.

Since his retirement from national radio, Wright often guest hosts the Steve Duemig show or other programming on 620 WDAE in Tampa. Wright and Duemig, as well as anchor/producer Darek Sharp, all worked together at WFNS, Tampa Bay's first ever sports talk radio station in the early 1990s.

Wright is the commissioner for the Todd Wright Tour since 2015. As of 2025 the Tour has hosted over 50 golf tournaments.
