= Mike Goldberg =

American sports commentator (born 1964)

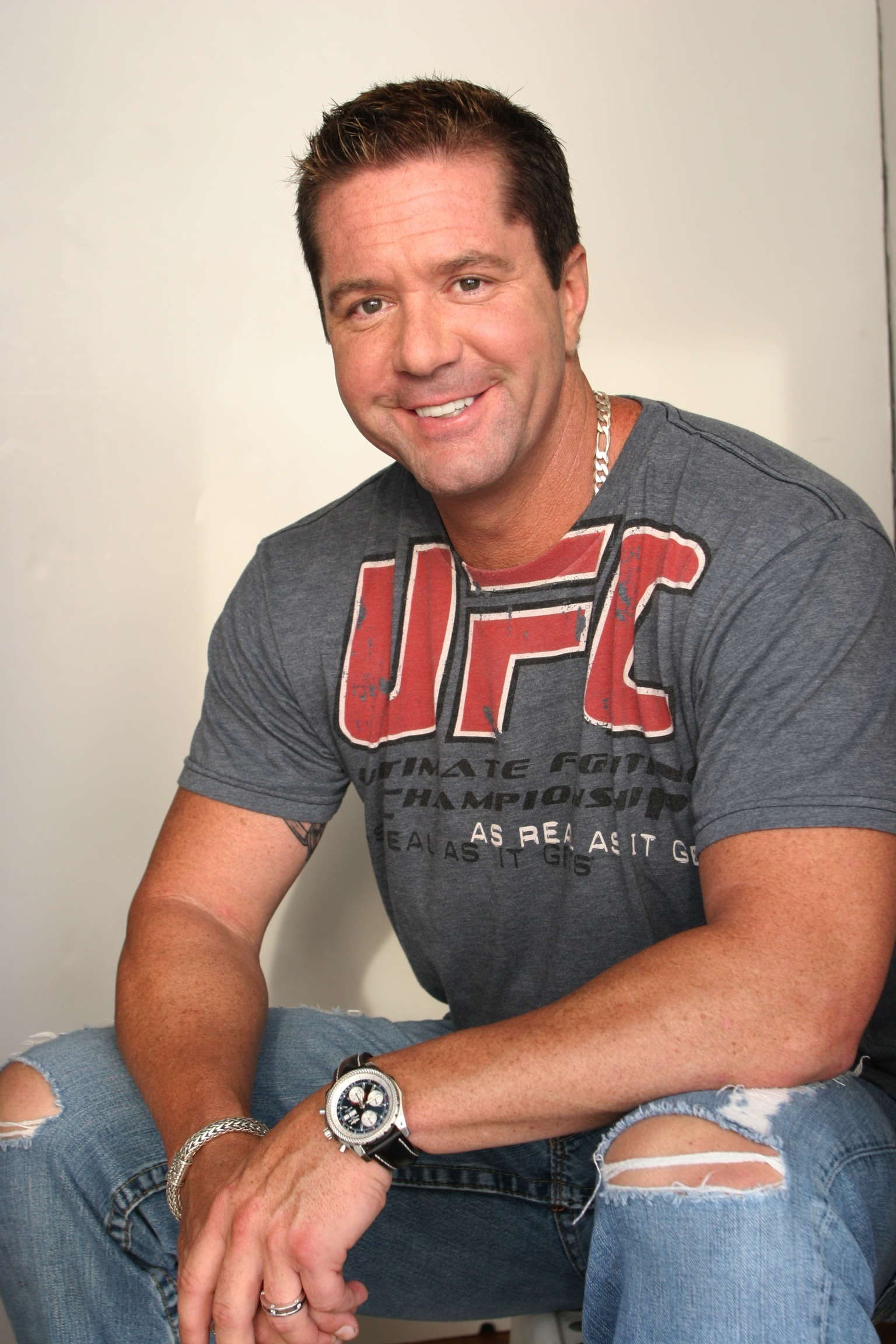
- Goldberg in 2008
- Born: November 24, 1964 (age 61); Cincinnati, Ohio, U.S.
- Education: Miami University
- Occupation: Play-by-play commentator

Mike Goldberg (born November 24, 1964) is an American play-by-play commentator currently working with BKB Bare Knuckle Boxing and ProBox TV, both alongside color commentator Paulie Malignaggi. He is mainly known for his work with the Ultimate Fighting Championship from 1997 until his departure in 2016. He also worked for Bellator MMA from June 2017 until April 2021.

== Broadcasting career ==
Born in Cincinnati, Ohio, Goldberg graduated from Miami University.

Goldberg also served as studio host for college football telecasts on FSN, as well as ACC Sunday Night Hoops, he also appeared as a guest host on The Best Damn Sports Show Period, and has been heard on Arizona Cardinals pre-season telecasts.

He is the former TV play-by-play announcer for the Detroit Red Wings, Minnesota Wild, and ESPN2 hockey, where he was paired with Brian Engblom, broadcasting over 900 NHL Games.

On December 21, 1997, Mike Goldberg made his UFC debut as commentator for UFC Japan: Ultimate Japan (also known as UFC Ultimate Japan or UFC 15.5) The event took place in Yokohama, Japan, and was available on pay-per-view in the United States.

From 2000 to 2002, Goldberg was a sideline reporter for the NFL on FOX.

In 2005, Goldberg was offered a contract to work for World Wrestling Entertainment (WWE), to be the head announcer on WWE's flagship show WWE Raw. Ultimately, Goldberg refused the WWE contract and signed a new deal with the UFC.

During his tenure with SportsChannel Chicago, he served as sideline reporter for the Chicago Bulls, including the Bulls' 1991, 1992 and 1993 World Championships. He has also called Big Ten, ACC and SEC college football and basketball games.

Goldberg also served as the host of Shaquille O'Neal's sports reality television show Shaq Vs.

On October 12, 2014, Goldberg made his NFL play-by-play debut. His foray into NFL announcing lasted just one game, as his mistake-filled broadcast, which included repeatedly referring to Minnesota Vikings coach Mike Zimmer as Don Zimmer, was widely panned. Afterwards, he engaged critical fans on Twitter with profane responses. This led to his swift removal from the following week's broadcast (replaced with Tim Brando) and the end of his NFL broadcasting career.

On December 28, 2016, the UFC announced that Goldberg would be leaving the promotion following UFC 207.

On June 24, 2017, Goldberg made his Bellator MMA debut at Bellator 180 in Madison Square Garden. In April 2021, it was announced that Goldberg and Bellator had parted ways.

He is known for his catchphrase "It is all over!", often said when a match ends in a knockout or submission.

== Personal life ==
Goldberg's father is Jewish and his mother is Catholic. Goldberg identifies as Christian and relatives of his died during The Holocaust. Goldberg is married to Kim Goldberg and has a daughter named Kiarra Goldberg who is an actress, and a son named Kole Goldberg.
