= Cold Pizza =

American TV sports talk show

- Genre: Sports; Talk show
- Directed by: Brian Hegner; Rob Katko; David Wexler
- Starring: Jay Crawford; Kit Hoover; Thea Andrews; Dana Jacobson; Woody Paige; Skip Bayless
- Country of origin: United States

Production
- Running time: 2 hours

Original release
- Network: ESPN2
- Release: October 20, 2003 – May 4, 2007

Related
- First Take

Cold Pizza is an American television sports morning talk show that aired weekdays on ESPN2 from October 20, 2003 to May 4, 2007. The show's style was more akin to Good Morning America than SportsCenter's straight news and highlights format. It included daily sports news, interviews with sports journalists, athletes, and personalities, and an assortment of other sports and non-sports topics.

The original co-hosts were Jay Crawford and Kit Hoover, with Thea Andrews serving as correspondent, and Leslie Maxie as the news anchor. The ESPN executive in charge of the program was James Cohen, who helped develop ESPN's popular talk show, Pardon the Interruption. The show was part of ESPN Original Entertainment overseen by ESPN programming chief Mark Shapiro. The executive producer/creator was Brian Donlon and he was assisted by Consulting Producer Steve Friedman, who oversaw NBC's Today Show during some of its most innovative and highly rated periods.

When it launched on October 20, 2003, it started at 7 am ET, but moved to 8 am just short of its first anniversary in an attempt to get male viewers who may be awaking a little later. The show repeated at 10 am for the West Coast and often updated the show for the west coast feed.

Although Cold Pizza was simulcast on ESPN2HD, it was not produced or presented in high definition. On October 2, 2006, DirecTV became the presenting sponsor with the show titled as Cold Pizza presented by DirecTV.

In the fall of 2004, in an attempt to heighten the sports news content of the program, newspaper columnists Woody Paige and Skip Bayless were added in a series of segments called 1st & 10. Moderated by Crawford, the segment aired four times per show covering 10 topics (just like in football where teams have four downs to cover 10 yards for a first down). Paige and Bayless would debate, discuss and cajole each other on the sports headlines of the day. By December 2004, re-edited segments and new wraps were transformed into a new half-hour program using the same name which aired on ESPN at 3 pm ET.

In March 2005, change came in front of the camera and behind the scenes. Kit Hoover and Thea Andrews were replaced by SportsCenter anchor Dana Jacobson. At the same time, Brian Donlon left as executive producer of Cold Pizza and 1st & 10 and was replaced by SportsCenter veteran producer Mike McQuade. More change followed, on November 28, 2006, Paige left the program citing health and personal reasons, leaving New York to return to the Denver Post, where he had been a longtime writer. He was not the last Cold Pizza member to leave the New York City studio location. In May 2007, the entire program shifted production to ESPN's Bristol headquarters. The final edition of Cold Pizza aired on May 4, 2007. The following Monday, May 7, the show was replaced by a very similar program, ESPN First Take, which initially maintained many features of Cold Pizza, but instead produced in high definition at ESPN's headquarters in Bristol, Connecticut. First Take (by this time with ESPN dropped from the show name) would eventually return to New York City in 2018 at the newly reconstructed Pier 17 at South Street Seaport.

== Broadcast history ==
Cold Pizza was notable for having its own version of ESPN's BottomLine, as their ticker not only gave sports scores, but also news headlines and weather forecasts from sports cities and is shown in its own color scheme. It also functioned differently: it constantly scrolled, while other ESPN "BottomLines" usually "flip" through the different scores, scrolling only for long statistical lines. This graphic was discontinued in the summer of 2006, when the "BottomLine" was changed to resemble those of other ESPN programs.

The program has gone on site for games and events quite often. On the road shows have included trips to Super Bowl XXXIX and XL and the Caesars Palace hotel and casino in Las Vegas. In 2004 the show had a regular series "Cold Pizza on Campus" where it went to colleges across the country big (such as Michigan State) and small (Mount Union College, a Division III football powerhouse. In an effort to save costs Friday's shows eventually originated from the College GameDay site. They went to New Orleans on September 25, 2006, for the re-opening of the Louisiana Superdome when the New Orleans Saints returned home to play the Atlanta Falcons.

The program also visited non-sports venues such as the Golden Globes and 2004 Democratic National Convention in Boston and Republican Convention in New York (which was held at Madison Square Garden directly across from Cold Pizza's Manhattan studio). The show's coverage of the intersection of politics generated positive reviews and media attention for the program. Appearing on Capital Report on CNBC on July 21, Cold Pizza Executive Producer Brian Donlon said “We’re a sports network and what we try to do is sit in the middle of the intersection of sports and sports lifestyles. If you look at the list of speakers, the list of delegates, some of the events, some of the parties -– there’s a Yankees-Red Sox game that kicks off the Democratic National Convention. The intersection of sports and politics is rich with stories and we’re going to be there to cover each and every one of them.”

Guests on the show have included Senator John McCain, Senator John Edwards, Rep.Dick Gephardt, Hank Aaron, rock star Bob Seger, who also served as the show's NBA analyst during the 2004 NBA Finals which featured the rocker's hometown Detroit Pistons, Pete Rose, Dennis Rodman, José Canseco, Senator Tom Davis, Mike Krzyzewski, Nick Lachey, X-Play Co-Host Morgan Webb and even the man that caught Barry Bonds' 715th home run ball.

On January 25, 2007 MediaWeek reported that ESPN would announce Cold Pizza's move from New York to the ESPN campus in Bristol, Connecticut. In addition to being able to cut costs and produce the program in high definition, the new locale allowed more live appearances by ESPN analysts (as opposed to satellite or telephone interviews). However, the move reduced the amount of live appearances by celebrities and non-sports figures. The official chronology shows that Cold Pizza ended on May 4, and was replaced by a new show, ESPN First Take, on May 7, though nearly all of the former show's features were incorporated into the new show.

== Format ==
From the show's inception through 2005, its format was similar to traditional network television morning shows such as Good Morning America and The Today Show, featuring discussion among the hosts on entertainment and sports topics. After poor initial ratings, the format was changed to be similar to that of SportsCenter and Pardon the Interruption, including sports headlines, analysis, and debate. Because of the format change, hosts Hoover and Maxie were let go due to lack of a sports journalism background, and Jacobson, Paige, and Bayless joined. Co-host Andrews was transferred by ESPN to Los Angeles to co-host ESPN2's new evening entertainment news show, ESPN Hollywood. That show was cancelled in January 2006, and Andrews remained with ESPN until November 2006, when she left the company to work as a correspondent for Entertainment Tonight.

The most recent format of the program featured the introduction graphic introducing the hosts and a show rundown. Following that was "The Top Story" of the sports world and an appropriate guest, followed by the "Morning Headlines," which included about four or five news items from around sports. The headline segment was repeated at the top of the second hour.

At 20 and 40 past the first and second hour, Crawford, Bayless and Paige (or a guest contributor after Paige's departure) were featured in segments entitled "1st and 10," which were edited into a stand-alone show that aired later in the day. The "Morning Slice," a look at offbeat sports video, was also part of the program.

== Personalities ==
- Skip Bayless: (Contributor, September 9, 2004 – May 4, 2007)
- Jay Crawford: (Co-host, October 20, 2003 – May 4, 2007)
- Dana Jacobson: (Co-host, March 2005 – May 4, 2007)
- Thea Andrews: (Co-host, October 20, 2003 – 2005)
- Kit Hoover: (Co-host, October 20, 2003 – 2005)
- Leslie Maxie: (Co-host, October 20, 2003 – 2004)
- Woody Paige: (Contributor, August 12, 2004 – November 28, 2006)
- Linda Cohn: (Co-host, 2006)
- Jay Harris (sportscaster): (Co-host, 2005)
- Tom Rinaldi: (Co-host, 2006–2007)
- Ahmad Rashad: (Co-host, 2006)
- Jeremy Schaap: (Co-host, 2005–2006)
- Matt Winer: (Co-host, 2006)
- Josh Elliott: (Co-host, 2006–2007)

== Segments ==
=== Daily ===
- Morning Headlines: This was a segment at the very beginning of each hour with Jacobson and Crawford run down the biggest headlines in the sports world.
- Here's the Latest: This segment was similar to Morning Headlines, but this informs viewers on the latest injury update and the latest on a developing story.
- The Top Story: This was at the beginning of the show when they go in-depth about a developing story and discuss it with insiders on the situation.
- 1st and 10: This segment appeared four different times during the program, when Crawford, Bayless, and a guest analyst debate some of the hottest topics in sports. This also airs at 3:00 p.m. ET on ESPN as its own show, and will continue on ESPN First Take.
- Morning Slice: This was when one of the hosts delivers an off the wall story. Sometimes called "Suzuki Way of Life."
- Top Plays:This segment appeared at different times throughout the show when they run down the top five plays of the day.
- Cover Two: This was when they are joined by two NFL columnists from all over the country to discuss different news and notes.
- MLB Doubleheader: This was when they are joined by two MLB columnists from all over the country to discuss different news and notes.
- Full Court Press: This was when they are joined by an NBA columnist from all over the country to discuss different news and notes.
- NBA News & Notes: This was when they are joined by another NBA columnist from all over the country to discuss different news and notes.
- SportsNation Question of the Day: This was a multiple-choice question for which fans get to vote at ESPN.com. The hosts give the result of the vote at the end of the show.
- NBA Minute: Highlights from the previous nights best games usually about 10 to 12 seconds per game for a total of 5 or 6 highlights.

=== Weekly ===
- Couch Potato: Every Friday, Howie Schwab, ESPN’s resident trivia guru, ran down the weekend's sports television viewing and Howie rates each of his choices with bags of chips, with five bags being the highest rating.
- The Gamers: Reviews of video games, also on Fridays. Sundance DiGiovanni, the president of Major League Gaming, had been the contributor to this segment.
- Gizmo Girl: This segment appeared weekly when they are joined by a guest to discuss a type of product that relates to sports.
- The Great Throwdini: This appeared every Friday during football season, when The Great Throwdini picks three NFL games by throwing knives blind folded at the teams logo.
- Plays of the Week: The top plays of the week, set to music.
- The Must List: Personal picks from Entertainment Weekly editor Peter Bonventre, every Thursday.
- Sports Doc: This was the weekly segment when Cold Pizza's sports medicine contributor Jonathan Glashow, MD gives analysis on one of the big injuries in the sports world. During the NFL season, it is called "Diagnosis NFL" and he is joined by Newsday columnist Bob Glauber.

=== Former ===
- When the show began, former NBA all-star Darryl Dawkins served as the gadget, fitness and relationship guru in a segment called Planet Lovetron. That was discontinued early in the show's run.
- Zach Leibowitz also contributed to the show at the halfway point when he mocked sideline reporters by grading Crawford and Hoover's performance in the first half of the show. This was also discontinued early on.
- After ESPN Hollywood was cancelled, Thea Andrews briefly hosted a segment of the latest news of the convergence between the sports and entertainment worlds called Sports and Hollywood which began in April 2006. The tightened focus on sports news resulted in an end to that segment in November 2006; however, actors and other performers still stopped by the Cold Pizza studios from time to time to pitch their projects and share their love of sports.

== Controversy ==
In February 2006, Texas Tech head basketball coach Bobby Knight was promoting a new reality show for ESPN entitled Knight School. Jacobson asked Knight at the end of the interview if he was interested in returning to his old coaching job at Indiana University. This made Knight angry, which ultimately led to him walking out of the interview. Jacobson was not at work the next day, but not because of the Knight incident; she had a planned vacation day, according to the network.

== Pre-emptions and cancellations ==
- One day in October 2005, the entire show was not seen. Crawford explained that unspecified technical difficulties made the show impossible to produce that day. ESPNEWS was simulcast on ESPN2 instead.
- Twice, Cold Pizza's rebroadcast has ended early due to breaking news: on September 27, 2006, due to conflicting reports as to whether Dallas Cowboys wide receiver Terrell Owens had attempted to commit suicide; and on November 17, 2006, when college football coach Bo Schembechler died from a heart attack. In both cases, SportsCenter was simulcast in the remainder of the scheduled time slot.
  - On the other hand, an altered, non-commercial version of the show was simulcast by ESPN on January 22, 2007, during the usual re-air slot, due to the resignation of Dallas Cowboys head coach Bill Parcells that was disclosed just before the end of the live show. This altered program ran from noon to 1:30 p.m. ET.
- On January 8, 2007, a mysterious gas-like odor was detected throughout New York City. Several buildings, including the Manhattan Center (where the show was produced) were evacuated. Cold Pizza was replaced with a simulcast of ESPNEWS, with the Mike & Mike Bottom Line informing viewers that "Cold Pizza will return Tuesday."

== See also ==
- 1st and 10
- First Take
