= Molly Qerim =

American sports anchor (born 1984)

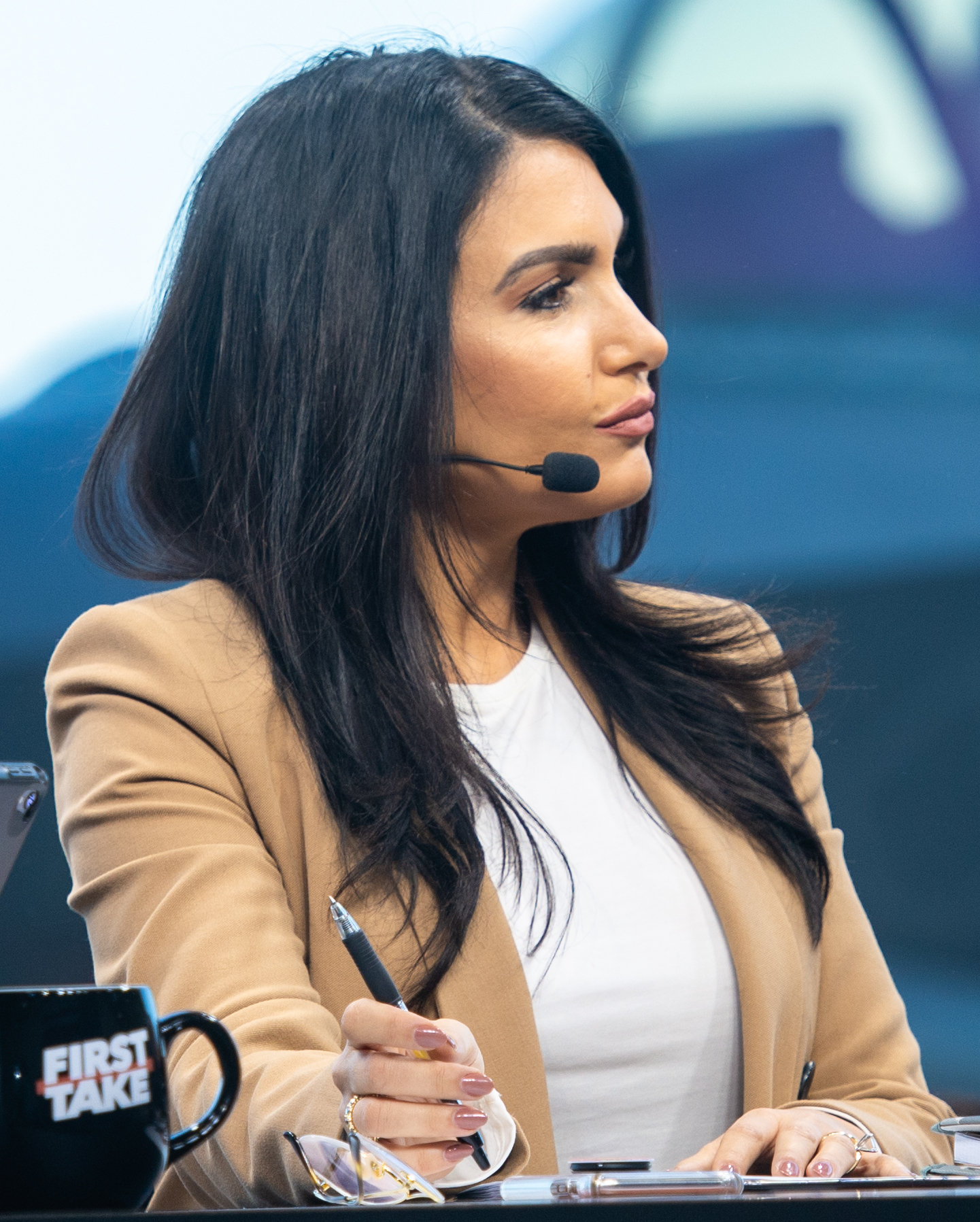
- Qerim at Luke Air Force Base in 2018
- Born: Molly Ann Qerim; March 31, 1984 (age 42); New Haven, Connecticut, U.S.
- Education: University of Connecticut (B.A.); Quinnipiac University (M.S.J.)
- Occupation: Sports anchor
- Years active: 2008–present
- Television: ESPN; Paramount+
- Spouse: Jalen Rose (m. 2018; div. 2021)

Molly Ann Qerim (born March 31, 1984) is an American television personality and former host of ESPN's First Take. She previously was the host of NFL Network's weekday morning show, NFL AM, and NFL Fantasy Live. As of January 2026 she is the host for the Zuffa Boxing promotion on Paramount+.

== Early life ==
Qerim was born at Yale New Haven Hospital and grew up in Cheshire, Connecticut, to an Italian Catholic mother and an Albanian father. She graduated from Cheshire High School before attending the University of Connecticut where she obtained a Bachelor of Arts in communications and a minor in business administration. She received a master's degree from Quinnipiac University in broadcast journalism.

== Career ==
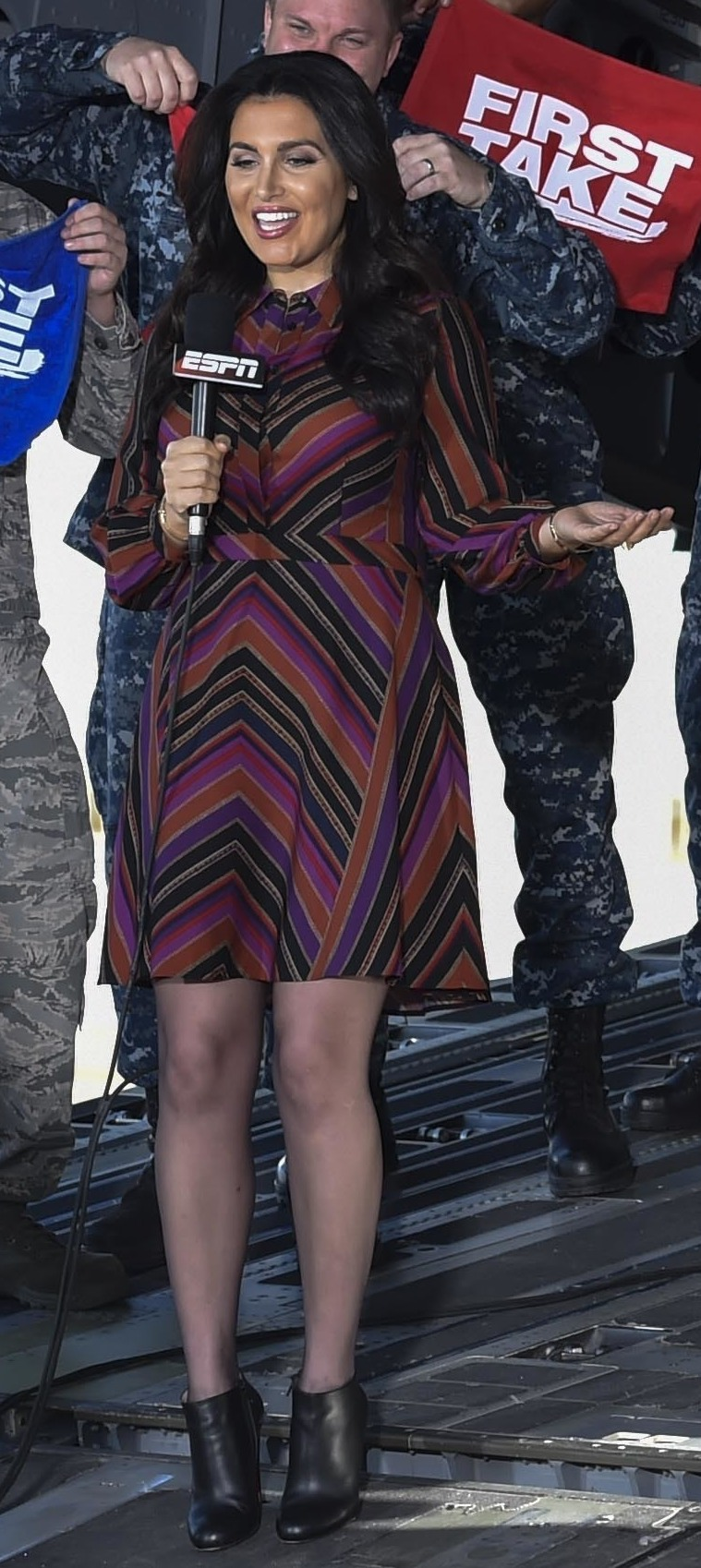
Qerim at Joint Base Charleston in 2016

Qerim began as an anchor and reporter for the CBS Sports Network.

She was also a studio anchor, where she hosted SEC Tailgate Show, SEC Tonight, MaxPreps Lemming Report, Full Court Press and Bracket Breakdown. Qerim has also covered the UFC in her time with ESPN, Versus (which became NBCSN) and FS1. In addition to her work outside the Octagon, she has co-hosted the annual World MMA Awards.

In 2008, Qerim was the interactive host for College Football Live on ESPN and ESPN2. She was also the breaking news reporter for Fantasy Football Now on ESPN2 and was honored with an Emmy for her contribution to the show. Additionally, she co-hosted Campus Connection on ESPNU.

Qerim has been part of other digital media content, conducting interviews of various athletes and celebrities for ESPN.com and ESPN Mobile. She has covered multiple Super Bowls (hosting, reporting, and red carpet events), the Heisman Trophy presentation, the NBA draft, the NBA All-Star Game and the MLB All-Star game, providing on-site reporting and interviews. She became the interim host of ESPN2's First Take in mid-July 2015. She replaced Cari Champion, who was promoted to ESPN's flagship show, SportsCenter. She was promoted to permanent host of First Take on September 15, 2015.

On September 15, 2025, Sports Business Journal, quoting sources, reported that Qerim declined a contract extension with ESPN and would be leaving the network at the end of 2025. Qerim later confirmed the news on Instagram, saying that "the news came out earlier than I intended, and not in the way I hoped," and that she had decided to "close this incredible chapter and step away from First Take." She added that hosting First Take was "one of the greatest honors of my career." Qerim did not appear on First Take the following day, as Stephen A. Smith opened the September 16 show with a tribute to her. Later on The Stephen A. Smith Show, Smith said that Qerim had "abruptly resigned" as the host of First Take, calling her a friend and "somebody that I have leaned on, on many occasions in the past, as she has done when it comes to me."

On January 22, 2026, Qerim announced that she would be hosting broadcasts for the Zuffa Boxing promotion on Paramount+. The program's on-air talent includes former First Take co-host Max Kellerman.

== Personal life ==
On April 13, 2018, Qerim announced that she has severe endometriosis. On July 20, 2018, Qerim married former NBA player and fellow ESPN host Jalen Rose. In December 2021, TMZ Sports announced Rose had filed for divorce from Qerim, after being separated for about a year.

Qerim is a fan of the NFL’s New York Giants.
