= Ryan Stewart (American football) =

American football player (born 1973)

No. 38, 42
- Position: Safety

Personal information
- Born: September 30, 1973 (age 53); Moncks Corner, South Carolina, U.S.
- Listed height: 6 ft 2 in (1.88 m)
- Listed weight: 207 lb (94 kg)

Career information
- High school: Berkeley (Moncks Corner)
- College: Georgia Tech
- NFL draft: 1996: 3rd round, 76th overall pick

Career history
- Detroit Lions (1996–2000)

Career NFL statistics
- Tackles: 34
- Sacks: 1
- Interceptions: 1
- Stats at Pro Football Reference

Ryan Evan Stewart (born September 25, 1973) is an American former professional football player who was a safety in the National Football League (NFL). He was selected 76th overall in the third round of the 1996 NFL draft. He played for the Detroit Lions from 1996 to 2000. He played collegiately for the Georgia Tech football team. He now hosts an Atlanta radio show, 2 Live Stews, with his brother Doug Stewart.

He was a contributor to ESPN's First Take.
