= Knight School (American TV series) =

- Coach Bob Knight
- Starring: Bob Knight
- Country of origin: United States
- Original language: English
- No. of episodes: 6

Production
- Running time: 40-45 minutes
- Production company: RIVR Media

Original release
- Network: ESPN
- Release: February 19 – March 26, 2006

Knight School is a television documentary series produced by ESPN about a group of sixteen Texas Tech University students trying to make the Bob Knight coached Texas Tech Red Raiders basketball team as a non-scholarship (walk-on) player for the 2006–07 National Collegiate Athletic Association (NCAA) season. The documentary chronicles their progress and gives insight into Bob Knight and his coaching style. It premiered February 19, 2006 at 10:00 EST on ESPN, with new episodes airing each Sunday.

According to the Texas Tech website, the sixteen hopefuls were required to meet university, Big 12 Conference, and NCAA criteria.

== The winner ==
During his first year with the team, contest winner Tyler Hoffmeister played in two games for a total of eight minutes. He scored three points on the season, coming during a victory over the University of Arkansas at Little Rock. He played his first game of the next season against Alaska Anchorage during the Great Alaska Shootout. Later in the season, when he scored the final basket for the Red Raiders in their at-home win over Louisiana Tech, the crowd gave Hoffmeister a loud ovation. After the game, Pat Knight said, "Even though he doesn't get into the game, he's a vital part of these two years. If the kid is a pain in the butt or not doing anything for the team, we get rid of him. It's obvious (with) our track record. These kids really like him."

== Reception ==
Fort Worth Star-Telegram's Don Bowman gave the show a B+, writing the show portrays Texas Tech Red Raiders basketball coach Bob Knight as "charming, caring and appealing". He wrote, "Knight knows the cameras are on and, yes, he plays to them. But there is sincerity, also." Paul Brownfield of the Los Angeles Times said Knight plays "a still-fierce-but-getting-cuddlier basketball coaching legend" who provides "good theater". The Orange County Register's Michael Lev wrote that the show "provides insight into the way Knight runs his practices and his program", calling it "an abridged, updated version" of the book A Season on the Brink.
