= First Take (talk show) =

Sports talk show broadcast by ESPN

- Starring: Stephen A. Smith; Shae Cornette various analysts
- Country of origin: United States
- Original language: English

Production
- Production locations: ESPN Studio, 7 Hudson Square, New York City
- Running time: 120 minutes

Original release
- Network: ESPN2 (2007–2016); ESPN (2017–present)
- Release: May 7, 2007 – present

Related
- Cold Pizza; Skip and Shannon: Undisputed

First Take is an American sports talk television program on ESPN. Episodes air daily Monday through Friday, with the live episode airing from 10 am ET until noon, with reruns from noon to 2 pm ET on ESPN2 and from 2 to 4 pm ET on ESPNews (when ESPN has other sports programming commitments, ESPN2 will air the live feed in place of ESPN and ESPNEWS will reair the show in place of ESPN2) .

The show broadcast from Studio E at ESPN's headquarters in Bristol, Connecticut for its first eleven years, before the show moved to the network's new South Street Seaport facility on Pier 17 in September 2018 after Labor Day. It also has "roadshow" broadcasts for events such as the weeks of the College Football Playoff, the Super Bowl and the NBA Finals from the cities where those events take place.

The entire show is available as a commercial-free podcast following the broadcast of the recorded show. Clips of the episodes are also uploaded to the ESPN YouTube page for viewing.

In June 2025, it was announced that First Take would relocate its production to ESPN's new headquarters at 7 Hudson Square in Lower Manhattan. The show is scheduled to debut from the new studio on June 23, 2025, joining other programs such as Get Up and UnSportsmanLike at the facility. The move marks the end of First Take's tenure at the South Street Seaport Studios, where it had broadcast since 2018.

== Format ==
Long-time sports reporter/analyst Stephen A. Smith is featured, along with various guests. The panelists debate various sports topics and offer hot takes about the sports news of the day.

== Cast ==
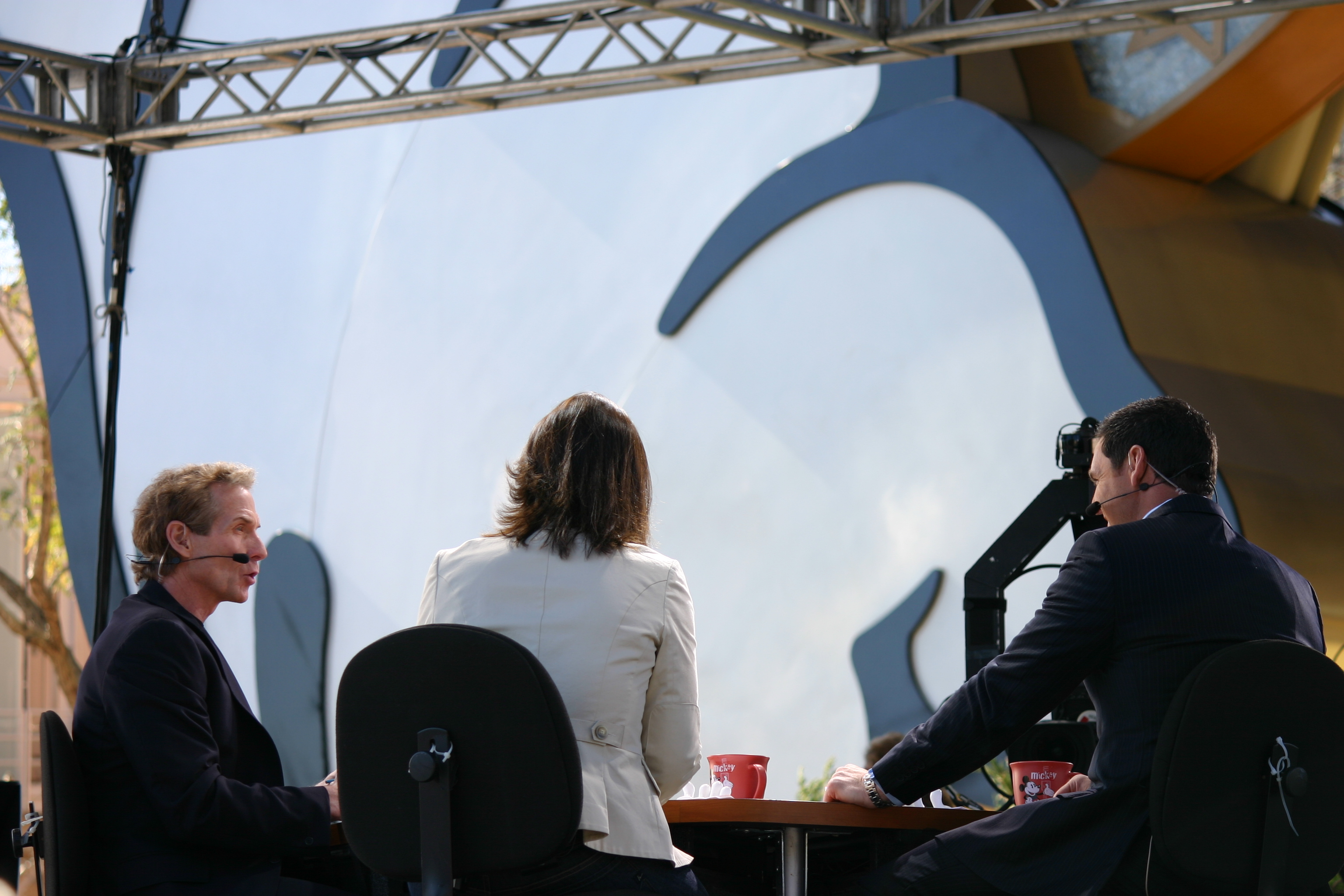
Skip Bayless (left), Dana Jacobson (center), and guest Jay Feely (right) at an outdoor broadcast of the show at Disney's Hollywood Studios in 2010

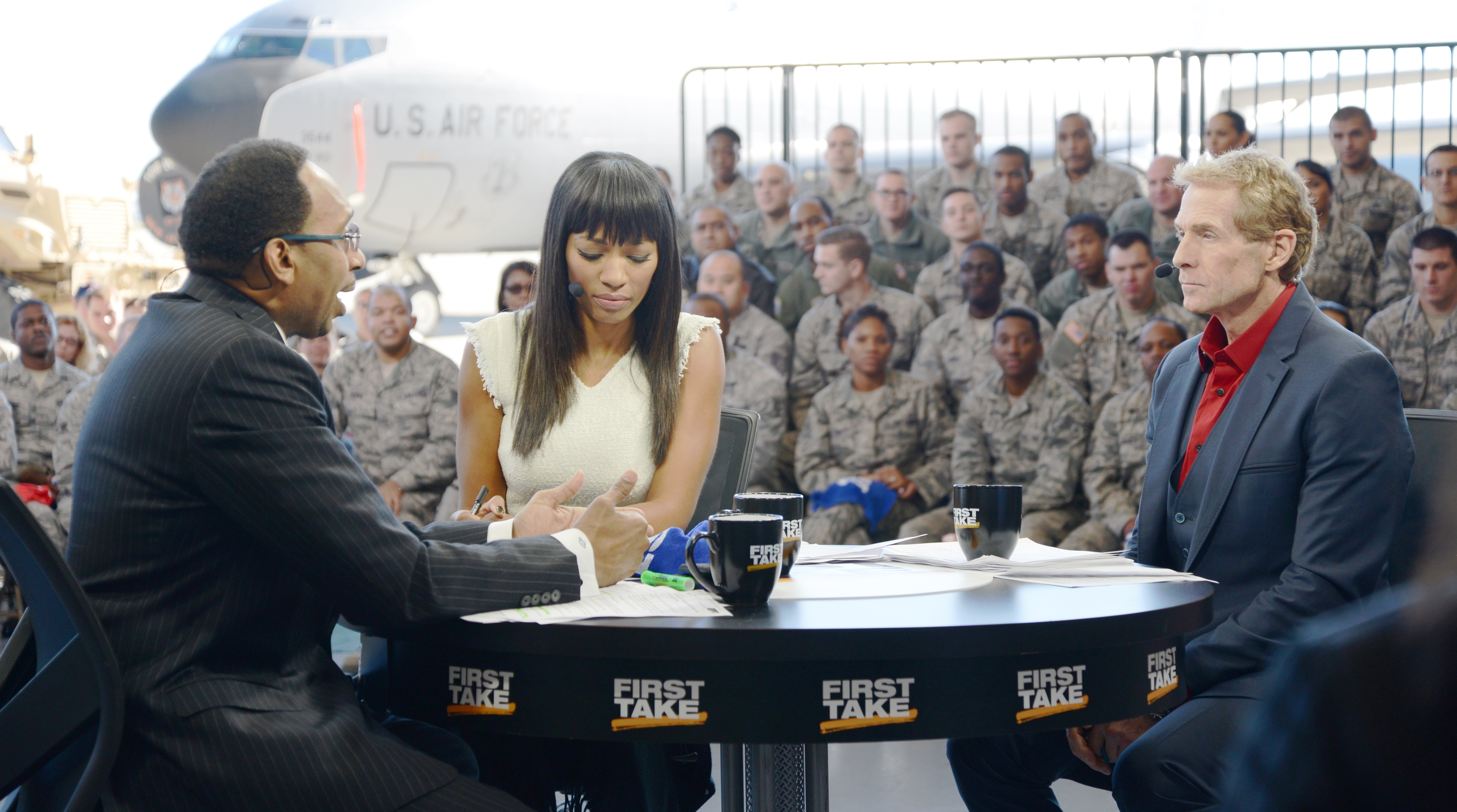
Stephen A. Smith (left), Cari Champion (center), and Bayless (right) during a broadcast at McGuire Air Force Base in 2014

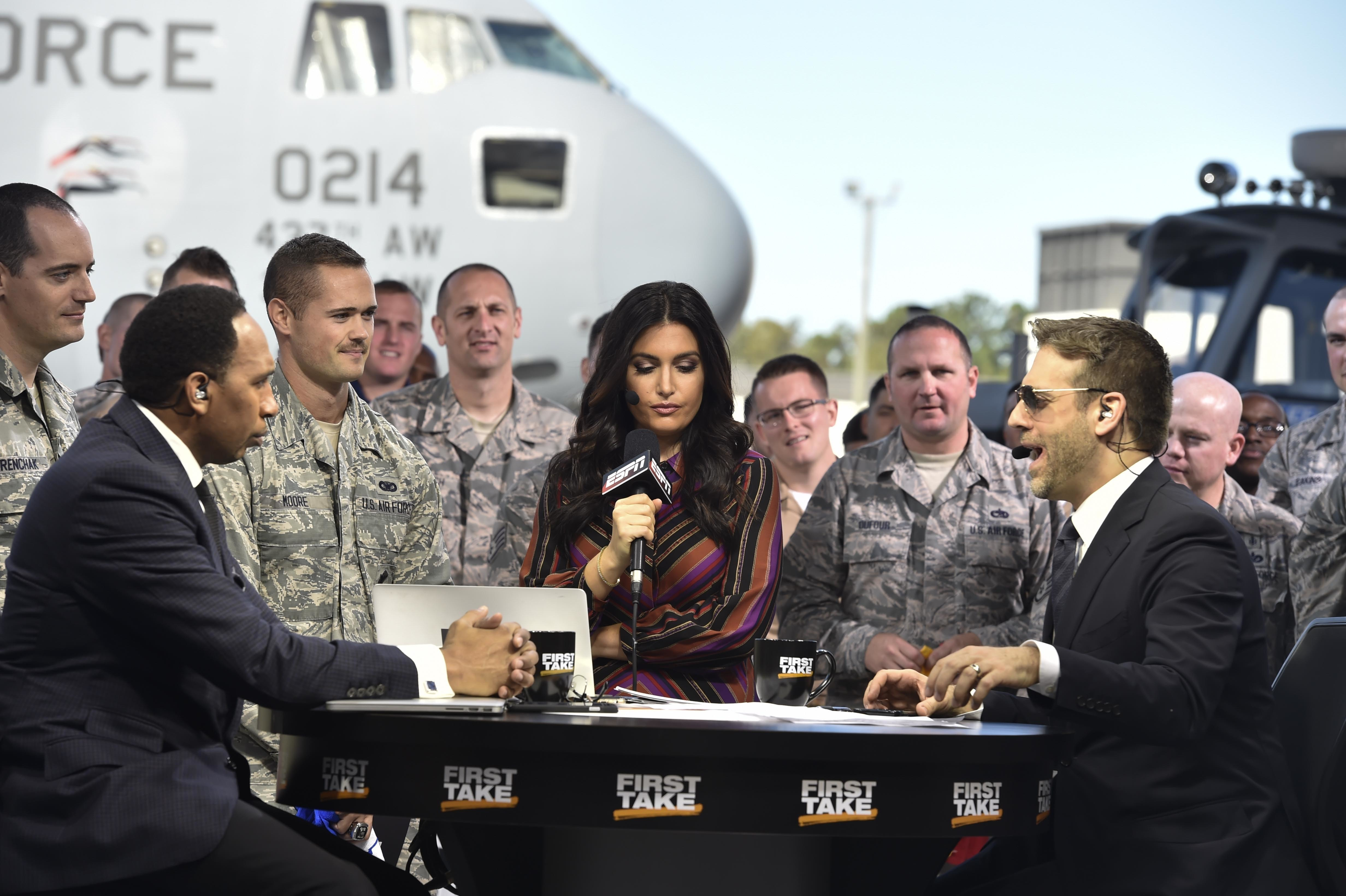
Smith (left), Molly Qerim (center), and Max Kellerman (right) during a live broadcast from Joint Base Charleston in 2016

- Stephen A. Smith: (2012–present)

Former analysts

- Max Kellerman: (2016–21)

=== Host (full-time) ===
- Jay Crawford: (2007–12)
- Dana Jacobson: (2007–11)
- Reischea Canidate: (2009–11)
- Cari Champion: (2012–15)
- Molly Qerim: (2015–25)
- Shae Cornette: (2025–present)

=== Frequent guest analysts ===
- Brian Windhorst: NBA Analyst
- Kendrick Perkins: NBA Analyst
- Skip Bayless: (2007–16; 2026–present as part time contributor)
- Tim Legler: NBA Analyst
- Kenny Smith: NBA Analyst
- Michael Irvin: NFL Analyst
- Louis Riddick: NFL Analyst
- Domonique Foxworth: NFL Analyst
- Mina Kimes: NFL Analyst
- Marcus Spears: NFL/College Football Analyst
- Dan Orlovsky: NFL Analyst
- Jeff Passan: MLB Analyst
- Harry Douglas: NFL Analyst
- Tim Tebow: NFL/College Football Analyst
- Sam Acho: NFL/College Football Analyst
- Alan Hahn: NBA Analyst
- Chris "Mad Dog" Russo: NFL/NBA/MLB Analyst
- Jeff Saturday: NFL Analyst
- P. K. Subban: NHL Analyst
- Pat McAfee: NFL Analyst
- Cam Newton: NFL Analyst
- Kenny Beecham: NBA Analyst
- Cam'ron: Rapper, NBA analyst
- Vincent Goodwill: NBA Analyst
- David Dennis Jr: NBA Analyst

=== Frequent guest hosts ===
- Christine Williamson
- Victoria Arlen
- Courtney Cronin

Former guest analysts/hosts

- Charly Arnolt (2019–23): Guest host, now works for OutKick.
- Rob Parker: Analyst/guest host (suspended from ESPN on December 20, 2012; did not return to network)
- Chris Broussard: Now works for Fox Sports.
- Will Cain (2015–20): Analyst/guest host, now works for Fox News and Fox & Friends Weekend
- Bart Scott: NFL Analyst
- Rosalyn Gold-Onwude: Guest Host
- Ryan Hollins: NBA Analyst
- Jalen Rose: NBA Analyst
- Keyshawn Johnson: NFL Analyst
- Vince Carter: NBA Analyst
- JJ Redick: NBA Analyst
- Shannon Sharpe (2023–25): NFL/NBA Analyst (resigned from ESPN following a sexual assault lawsuit)
- Cam Newton: NFL Analyst
- Damien Woody: NFL Analyst
- Ryan Clark: NFL Analyst

== History ==
The show was originally hosted and moderated by Jay Crawford and Dana Jacobson, formerly of the show's predecessor Cold Pizza.

In August 2011, the show underwent a drastic format change. Segments of the show were taken out and Skip Bayless' role in the show saw a dramatic increase, while the show itself began to focus on the debate. The ratings for the show saw a drastic increase as a result, with a reported 58% increase for the first 3 months of 2012, compared to the same time in 2011.

On April 30, 2012, it was announced on-air that regular guest contributor Stephen A. Smith would be joining First Take on a permanent, five-day-per-week basis. On occasions he was reporting from elsewhere, Rob Parker was frequently featured as his replacement until December 20, 2012, when he was suspended for comments made about Robert Griffin III; he would not return, as ESPN allowed his contract to expire, rather than re-sign him.

In June 2012, long-time host Crawford announced he would be leaving First Take in order to present SportsCenter.

On July 23, 2012, the show debuted a new set and a new opening song Every Word Great by Wale featuring Stalley. It now featured an open slideshow showing Bayless and Smith arriving at campus (Once Kellerman joined the show in 2016, scenes showing Kellerman replaced those of Bayless). They are still in Studio E but they are in the middle of it, with a new desk.

In line with these changes, First Take introduced on October 1, 2012 a new permanent moderator, Cari Champion, previously a reporter from the Tennis Channel.

Previously, the show had a rotation of moderators, such as Todd Grisham, Don Bell (now Sports Director & anchor with Philadelphia's KYW-TV), Cindy Brunson (now with Fox Sports Arizona) and Jemele Hill.

On January 13, 2015, the first special edition of the show aired after the 2015 College Football Playoff National Championship titled First Take: College Football Championship Post Game Special.

On June 19, 2015, Champion left First Take due to her promotion to SportsCenter anchor. The following month, she was replaced on an interim basis by Molly Qerim, who was promoted to permanent host on September 15.

On July 25, 2016, Max Kellerman permanently replaced Skip Bayless as the First Take co-host as Bayless had left ESPN to join rival network FS1 and started another sports talk program called Skip and Shannon: Undisputed.

On January 3, 2017, First Take switched channels with the two editions of SportsCenter. First Take moved to ESPN, while the 10:00 a.m. and 11:00 a.m. ET editions of SportsCenter moved to ESPN2. The move was made in an effort to boost the show's ratings, which had declined since Bayless' departure from ESPN.

In September 2018, the show moved to ESPN's New York studios, and received a new logo and graphics as part of the move.

In 2021, Kellerman left First Take to allow for a new format involving rotating guest analysts appearing alongside Smith. Kellerman's last day on the show was September 1. Smith later revealed that he wanted Kellerman off of First Take as he believed the two of them lacked the chemistry they once had, although he clarified that there were no hard feelings towards Kellerman: "I wasn't pointing a finger at him. I was saying we did not work as a pair."

In September 2025, it was reported that Qerim would be leaving ESPN at the end of 2025 after declining a contract renewal with the network. Qerim later confirmed the news on her Instagram account. Qerim said that she had "the privilege of sharing the desk with some of the most brilliant, passionate, and entertaining voices in sports," and that hosting the show "has been one of the greatest honors of my career." Qerim did not appear on First Take after her announcement, with Stephen A. Smith announcing on his radio show that she had "abruptly resigned" as host. She was eventually replaced by Shae Cornette, starting in November.

On the May 8, 2026 episode of First Take, Skip Bayless reunited with former co-host Stephen A. Smith after 10 years.

== Controversy ==
Through the show's success, First Take has experienced substantial controversy and faced increasing criticism, mostly concerning perceived sensationalism (particularly favouritism over topics involving New York and Los Angeles teams, LeBron James and the Dallas Cowboys).

Among claims have been that First Take has used hot button racial issues to create inflammatory debates and increase ratings. Most notably, during a discussion regarding Washington Redskins quarterback Robert Griffin III, frequent guest Rob Parker asked whether Griffin III was a "brother" or a "cornball brother." When pressed by host Cari Champion as to what that meant, Parker mentioned that Griffin III had a white fiancée and mentioned claims that Griffin III was a Republican. In response, Bayless asked whether Griffin III's braids did anything to assuage Parker's concerns. Stephen A. Smith has also been at the center of the controversy with remarks about Cleveland Cavalier J.R. Smith's dress wear during a Cavaliers game that included a "hoodie" being worn on the bench in late October 2017. This resulted in a public rant by J.R. Smith taking to Twitter to express his disapproval of Stephen A. Smith's comments, ultimately ending the rant with the accusation of Smith being an "Uncle Tom". J.R. Smith made these remarks due to a segment from Stephen A. Smith stating that "white folks" would be of disapproval in regard to what could be a "Trayvon Martin case being revisited" with a tweet questioning the work of Stephen A. Smith stating, "this man is always reaching. What does me wearing a hoodie on the bench have anything to do with reminding people of #TrayvonMartin". Stephen A. Smith not only reprimanded Smith for wearing a hoodie during the fourth quarter of a late October game, but reprimanded Nike for making a uniform that is unprofessional amongst racial remarks.

The show has been criticized for what is perceived by many as its excessive coverage of the career of Tim Tebow. During his tenure with the Jets, in which he did not start in a game, and threw just eight passes the entire season, Tebow was nonetheless often a leading topic.

As Cleveland Cavaliers forward LeBron James began a series of playoff appearances with the Cavaliers, host Skip Bayless became well known for his belief that James had been overrated by the media and not received enough criticism for his team's playoff failures. Bayless has himself been criticized by fans as well as members of the media for exaggerating James' failures and diminishing his successes. In an exchange with Dallas Mavericks owner Mark Cuban, Cuban argued that Bayless had reduced his analysis of the 2011 and 2012 NBA Finals series to subjective and limited assessments of player psyche, and had not even considered the offensive and defensive strategies used by the teams in each series.

In February 2016, Stephen A. Smith, as well as ESPN, Little League Baseball, and Chris Janes, were sued by the parents of players from the Jackie Robinson West baseball team, whose 2014 Little League World Series title was vacated after Janes found the team had used ineligible players from outside a defined regional boundary. The lawsuit contained an allegation that Smith had made a defamatory remark regarding the controversy on First Take, which "directly accused the JRW parents of perpetrating a fraud against the Little League".

During the 2021 Major League Baseball season, host Stephen A. Smith's comments regarding Japanese All-Star Shohei Ohtani garnered controversy. During an episode of First Take, Smith was quoted as stating, "This brother is special, make no mistake about it. But the fact that you've got a foreign player that doesn't speak English, that needs an interpreter—believe it or not, I think contributes to harming the game to some degree, when that's your box office appeal. It needs to be somebody like Bryce Harper, Mike Trout, those guys. ... I understand that baseball is an international sport itself in terms of participation. But when you talk about an audience gravitating to the tube, or to the ballpark, to actually watch you, I don't think it helps that the number one face is a dude that needs an interpreter so that you can understand what the hell he's saying in this country."

Smith's comments were met with backlash on social media, with many feeling such statements were insensitive and offensive to the Asian community. Smith later issued a statement through Twitter, clarifying that his comments were misinterpreted and focused more so on baseball's "marketability and promotion". He further apologized, stating "As an African-American, keenly aware of the damage stereotyping has done to many in this country, it should've elevated my sensitivities even more. Based on my words, I failed in that regard and it's on me, and me alone! I screwed up. In this day and age, with all the violence being perpetrated against the Asian Community, my comments – albeit unintentional – were clearly insensitive and regrettable. There's simply no other way to put it. I contributed to [Asian-hate] yesterday and that's inexcusable."

Ohtani, amidst a historic season at the time, responded in an interview, stating "Of course, I would want to. Obviously, it wouldn't hurt to be able to speak English. There would only be positive things to come from that. But I came here to play baseball, at the end of the day, and I've felt like my play on the field could be my way of communicating with the people, with the fans."

On March 8, 2023, Kendrick Perkins received backlash and criticism for his comments relating to race, where he insisted the majority of voters were white and as well the MVP candidacy of Serbian NBA player and reigning MVP Nikola Jokić.
