= Jay Crawford =

American sports journalist

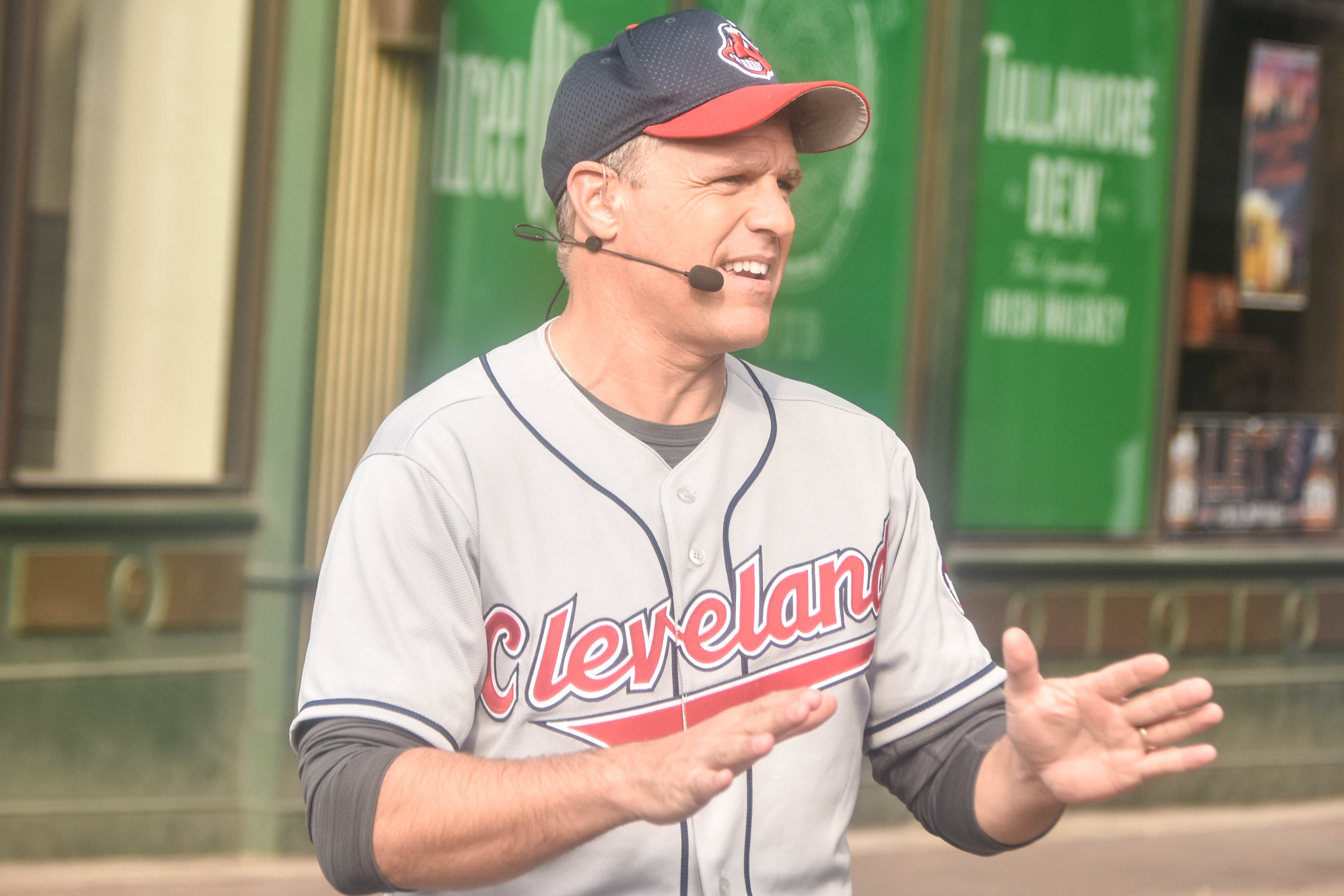
- Born: July 4, 1965 (age 61); Sandusky, Ohio, U.S.
- Education: Bowling Green State University (B.A.)
- Notable credit(s): Four regional Emmy Awards; Best Sportscaster Kentucky AP Award; Three SPJ Best Sports Program Awards
- Spouse: Tracy
- Children: 2

Jason Crawford (born July 4, 1965) is an American TV news and sports anchor, who is best known nationally for his time at ESPN. Crawford anchored the live 11 p.m. edition of SportsCenter with Chris McKendry until April 2017. Prior to that, Crawford spent nine years hosting ESPN's morning show Cold Pizza, its successor ESPN First Take, and First Take spinoff 1st and 10. He is currently a news anchor for NBC affiliate WKYC-TV 3 in Cleveland, seen on the station's 5 p.m. newscast since January 2020.

== Biography ==
=== Early life ===
Born in Sandusky, Ohio, Crawford graduated from Perkins High School in Sandusky, Ohio in 1983. He went on to graduate from Bowling Green State University with a bachelor's degree in Radio, Television, and Film in 1987.

=== Career ===
Prior to joining ESPN he was the local sports director for WFTS-TV in Tampa, FL from 1998 to 2003. Prior to that stint he had a similar role at WBNS-TV in Columbus, OH from 1993 to 1998. He was a weekend sports anchor for WTIC-TV in Hartford, CT from 1992 to 1993. He started his sports career in 1987 at WYMT-TV in Hazard, Kentucky.

Crawford made three appearances as a minor league baseball pitcher in 2005, splitting time between two independent teams, the St. Paul Saints and the Long Beach Armada. He registered ad with a 2.25 ERA, and in his final outing, Crawford threw two hitless innings, striking out each batter he faced using a change-up that reached a top speed of 62 mph, while his fastball was recorded at 93 mph.

On May 21, it was announced via Twitter that in July 2012, Crawford will co-anchor SportsCenter in the noon slot with Chris Mckendry replacing John Buccigross who moves to the 11:00PM slot. In 2004, he hosted some horse racing telecasts for ESPN.

On April 24, 2017, Crawford was laid off from his role as Sportscenter host in a string of cuts including over 100 ESPN employees.

=== Returning to Ohio ===
On September 26, 2017, BGSU announced that Crawford would join the university as an executive in residence. Crawford will be sharing his expertise with students and faculty in the School of Media and Communication, in the Department of Sport Management and with student-athletes.

On April 11, 2018, the Cleveland Browns announced that Crawford, alongside former Browns quarterback Tim Couch, would call the team's preseason games.

On May 28, 2019, Tegna owned NBC affiliate WKYC channel 3 in Cleveland announced that Crawford would become the 5 p.m. news anchor when it started broadcasting in January 2020. In October 2019, he began to host an informal-style noontime show for the station, Lunch Break with Jay Crawford. In January 2020, Crawford became channel 3's 5 p.m. news anchor alongside chief meteorologist Betsy Kling.

In May 2022, Crawford began co-hosting on the Ultimate Cleveland Sports Show, a daily YouTube talk show discussing Cleveland sports.
