= Dana Jacobson =

American journalist

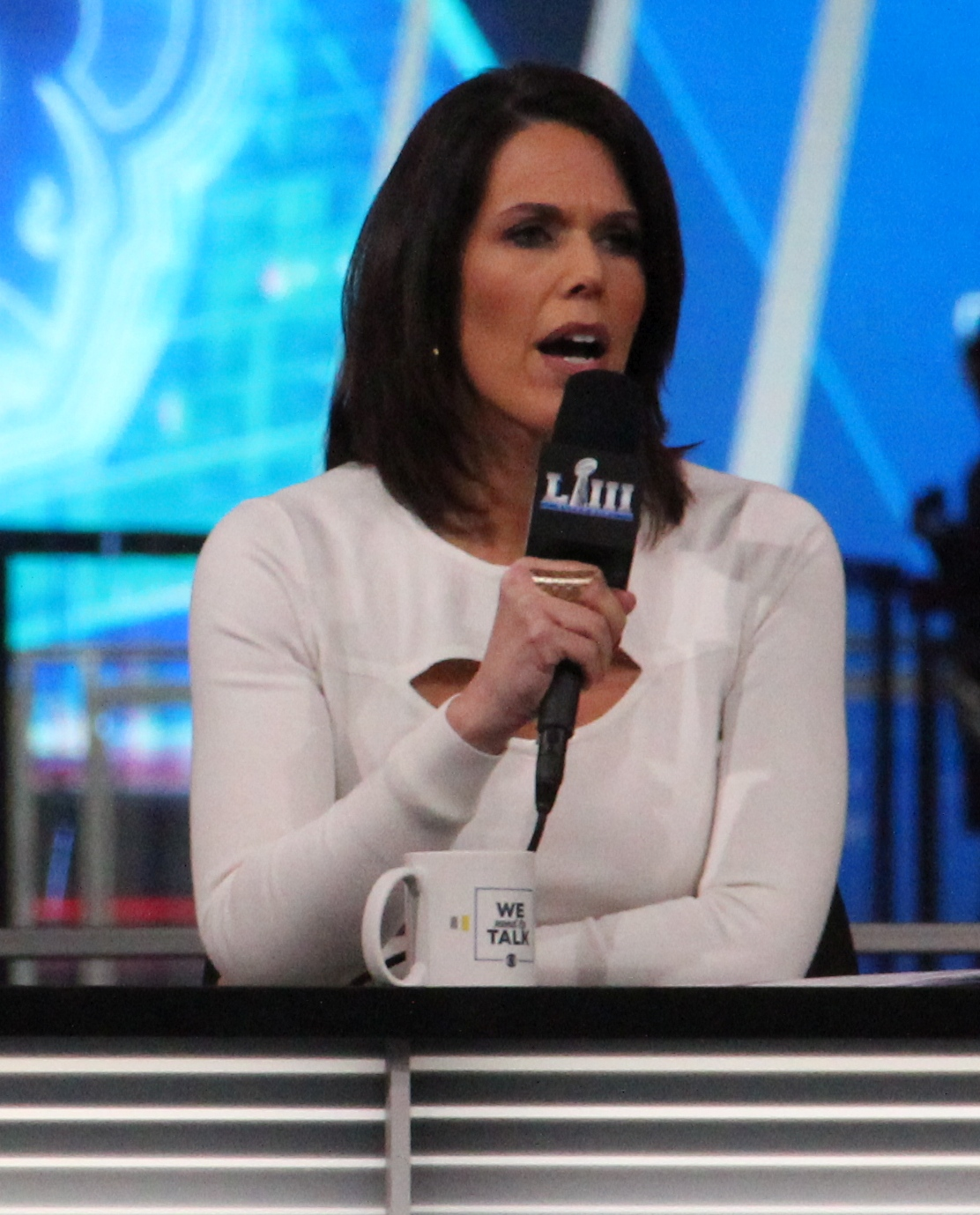
- Jacobson in 2019
- Born: November 5, 1971 (age 54)
- Education: University of Michigan (BA)
- Presenting career
- Show: CBS Saturday Morning
- Network: CBS
- Show: We Need to Talk
- Network: CBS Sports Network
- Time slot: Various
- Country: United States
- Previous shows: Cold Pizza; First Take
- Website: danajacobson.blogspot.com

Dana Jacobson (born November 5, 1971) is an anchor & reporter for CBS Sports and CBS Sports Network. She joined CBS News in 2015, 2 years after she began working for CBS Sports Network. Prior to that Jacobson spent a decade at ESPN, from 2002 until 2012. In March 2005, she was named co-host of Cold Pizza and transitioned with the show as it became First Take. On December 30, 2011, she left First Take and returned to anchoring SportsCenter. On March 27, 2012, USA Today announced that Jacobson would leave ESPN when her contract expires at the end of April. Monday, April 30, 2012, was her final day at ESPN when she anchored the 6–8 p.m. ET SportsCenter.

On July 13, 2018, Jacobson, along with long-time CBS correspondent Michelle Miller, were named the new co-hosts of the Saturday edition of CBS This Morning. In October 2025 Paramount announced a series of layoffs at CBS News. These layoffs included those employed at CBS Morning Saturday. On November 22, 2025 Jacobson hosted her last edition of CBS Morning Saturday.

Jacobson remains the only one to have anchored both ESPN SportsCenter and the CBS Evening News.

== Early life and career ==
Jacobson was born and raised in the suburbs of Detroit, Michigan, in a Jewish family and attended Andover High School in Bloomfield Hills, Michigan. Subsequently, she attended and graduated from Valley High School in West Des Moines, Iowa, in 1989. Jacobson graduated from the University of Michigan in 1993 with a Bachelor of Arts in English and communications and was a member of the Pi Beta Phi sorority. In October 2018, Jacobson was honored by the Michigan Jewish Sports Foundation as one of their Hall of Fame inductees.

== Controversy ==
At what was a private roast for her co-workers Mike Greenberg and Mike Golic in January 2008, Jacobson, who is Jewish, cursed the University of Notre Dame's Touchdown Jesus. Jacobson and ESPN both released a statement apologizing to those offended by the roast comments.
