= Fernando =

- Pronunciation: European Portuguese: [fɨɾˈnɐ̃du] Spanish: [feɾˈnando]
- Gender: Male

Other gender
- Feminine: Fernanda

Origin
- Origin: Spain and Portugal
- Meaning: courageous, adventurer, conqueror, and leader

Fernando is a Spanish and Portuguese given name and a surname common in Spain, Portugal and former Spanish or Portuguese colonies in Latin America, Africa and Asia (such as the Philippines, India, and Sri Lanka). It is the second most used surname in Sri Lanka. Fernando is a common surname among the Sinhala speaking people. It is equivalent to the Germanic given name Ferdinand, with an original meaning of "adventurous, bold journey".

== Given name ==
=== A ===
- Fernando Abad (born 1985), Dominican baseball player
- Fernando Abreu (born 1984), Brazilian/Portuguese footballer
- Fernando de Abreu (born 1944), Brazilian swimmer
- Fernando de Abreu (rower) (1906–1974), Brazilian rower
- Fernando Acevedo (1946–2024), Peruvian track and field athlete
- Fernando Aceves Humana, Mexican painter
- Fernando Herrero Acosta (1952–2023), Costa Rican economist and politician
- Fernando Aenlle-Rocha (born 1961), Cuban-American judge
- Fernando Andacht, Uruguayan semanticist
- Fernando Agüero (1917–2011), Nicaraguan politician
- Fernando Aiuti (1935–2019), Italian immunologist and politician
- Fernando Alarza (born 1991), Spanish triathlete
- Fernando Díaz Alberdi (born 1972), Argentine rugby union player
- Fernando Albermager (born 1979), Uruguayan footballer
- Fernando Alegría (1918–2005), Chilean poet and writer
- Fernando Alonso (born 1981), Spanish Formula One driver
- Fernando Amorebieta (born 1985), Venezuelan footballer
- Fernando Amorsolo (1892–1972), Filipino painter
- Fernando Antogna (born 1976), Argentine track and road cyclist
- Fernando Aramayo (born 1974), Bolivian economist
- Fernando de Araújo (disambiguation), multiple people
- Fernando Asuero (1887–1942), Spanish footballer and doctor

=== B ===
- Fernando Baiano (born 1979), Brazilian footballer
- Fernando Balzaretti (1946–1998), Mexican actor
- Fernando Barrichello (born 2005), Brazilian racing driver
- Fernando Baudrit Solera (1907–1975), Costa Rican president of the supreme court
- Fernando Botero (1932–2023), Colombian artist
- Fernando Brobró (1934–2006), Brazilian basketball player
- Fernando Bujones (1955–2005), Cuban American ballet dancer

=== C ===
- Fernando Cabrera (born 1981), American baseball pitcher
- Fernando Cabrita (1923–2014), Portuguese footballer and manager
- Fernando Cáceres (born 1969), Argentine footballer
- Fernando Camargo (born 1977), Colombian road cyclist
- Fernando Chui Sai On (born 1957), Macanese statesman; former Chief Executive of Macau
- Fernando Climent (born 1958), Spanish rower
- Fernando Collor de Mello (born 1949), Brazilian former president
- Fernando Colunga (born 1966), Mexican actor
- Fernando Cortez (born 1981), American baseball player

=== D ===
- Fernando Delgadillo (born 1965), Mexican singer

=== E ===
- Fernando Echávarri (born 1972), Spanish sailor
- Fernando Errázuriz Aldunate (1777–1841), Chilean politician
- Fernando Esteso (1945–2026), Spanish comedian, actor and singer

=== F ===
- Fernando Fernán Gómez (1921–2007), Spanish film actor and director
- Fernando Fernández (disambiguation), multiple people
- Fernando Fonseca (born 1997), Portuguese footballer
- Fernando Fonseca (footballer, born 1993), Brazilian footballer
- Fernando Francisco Reges (born 1987), Brazilian footballer

=== G ===
- Fernando Gago (born 1986), Argentine footballer and manager
- Fernando Gallego (1440–1507), Spanish painter
- Fernando García (disambiguation), multiple people
- Fernando Garibay (born 1982), Mexican-American record producer
- Fernando Gómez, multiple people
- Fernando González (disambiguation), multiple people

=== H ===
- Fernando Haddad (born 1963), Brazilian politician
- Fernando Henrique Cardoso (born 1931), Brazilian former president
- Fernando Henriques (1916–1976), British social anthropologist
- Fernando Hierro (born 1968), Spanish footballer

=== J ===
- Fernando Jácome (born 1980), Colombian freestyle swimmer

=== L ===
- Fernando Lamas (1915–1982), Argentine actor and director
- Fernando Larraín (born 1962), Chilean actor and comedian
- Fernando Llorente (born 1985), Spanish footballer
- Fernando Lopez (1904–1993), Filipino statesman
- Fernando de Lucia (1861–1925), Italian tenor
- Fernando Lugo (born 1951), Paraguayan politician and former president
- Fernando Luiz Roza (born 1985), Brazilian footballer

=== M ===
- Fernando de Magallanes (Ferdinand Magellan, 1480–1521), Portuguese explorer who organized the first circumnavigation of the world
- Fernando Martín (1962–1989), Spanish basketballer
- Fernando Martínez, multiple people
- Fernando Martínez Perales (born 1967), Spanish footballer
- Fernando Lucas Martins (born 1992), Brazilian footballer
- Fernando Mayén (born 2003), Mexican gridiron football player
- Fernando Meirelles (born 1955), Brazilian film director
- Fernando de Melo Viana (1878–1954), Brazilian politician
- Fernando Mendoza (born 2003), American football player
- Fernando Montiel (born 1979), Mexican boxer
- Fernando de Moraes (born 1980), Brazilian footballer
- Fernando Morales (disambiguation), multiple people
- Fernando Morán (born 1976), Spanish footballer
- Fernando Morán (1926–2020), Spanish politician and diplomat
- Fernando Moresi (1970–2016), Argentine field hockey player
- Fernando Morientes (born 1976), Spanish footballer
- Fernando Muslera (born 1986), Uruguayan football

=== O ===
- Fernando Ochoaizpur (born 1971), Bolivian footballer
- Fernando Ortiz (disambiguation), multiple people
- Fernando Ovelar (born 2004), Paraguayan footballer

=== P ===
- Fernando Parrado (born 1949), Uruguayan businessman and Andes plane crash survivor
- Fernando Pérez (disambiguation), multiple people
- Fernando Pessoa (1888–1935), Portuguese poet and writer
- Fernando Pileggi (born 1999), Brazilian footballer
- Fernando Poe Sr. (1916–1951), Filipino actor
- Fernando Poe Jr. (1939–2004), Filipino actor
- Fernando Prass (born 1978), Brazilian footballer
- Fernando Pires Ferreira (1842–1907), Brazilian surgeon, father of ophthalmology in Brazil

=== Q ===
- Fernando Quintanilla (born 1964), Spanish footballer

=== R ===
- Fernando Rech (born 1974), Brazilian footballer
- Fernando Redondo (born 1969), Argentine footballer
- Fernando Retayud (born 1969), Colombian boxer
- Fernando Rey (1917–1994), Spanish actor
- Fernando Ricksen (1976–2019), Dutch footballer
- Fernando Rielo (1923–2004), Spanish poet and philosopher
- Fernando Riera (1920–2010), Chilean footballer and manager
- Fernando Rodney (born 1977), Dominican baseball player
- Fernando Romero (disambiguation)
- Fernando Romero (born 2000), Paraguayan footballer
- Fernando Rosas (born 1946), Portuguese historian and politician

=== S ===
- Fernando Santos, multiple people
- Fernando Serrano (1789–1819), Colombian statesman
- Fernando Solabarrieta (born 1970), Chilean journalist
- Fernando dos Santos Pedro (born 1999), Brazilian footballer
- Fernando Soler (1896–1979), Mexican film actor and director
- Fernando Sor (1778–1839), Spanish classical guitarist and composer
- Fernando Soriano (born 1979), Spanish footballer

=== T ===
- Fernando Tatís (born 1975), Dominican baseball player
- Fernando Tatís Jr. (born 1999), Dominican baseball player
- Fernando Torres (born 1984), Spanish footballer

=== V ===
- Fernando Valades (1920–1978), Mexican composer, pianist and singer
- Fernando Valenzuela (1960–2024), Mexican MLB pitcher
- Fernando Vargas (born 1977), Mexican American boxer
- Fernando Verdasco (born 1983), Spanish tennis player
- Fernando Vergara (born 1970), Chilean footballer and manager
- Fernando Villalona (born 1955), Dominican merengue singer

=== Z ===
- Fernando Zóbel de Ayala y Montojo (1924–1984), Filipino painter
- Fernando Zobel de Ayala (born 1960), Filipino businessman

== Surname ==
=== A ===
- Akshu Fernando (1991–2025), Sri Lankan cricketer
- Alexander Fernando (1940–2020), Sri Lankan actor
- Ambrose Fernando (1912–1999), Indian businessman and politician from Tamil Nadu
- Aron Fernando (1761–1828), Italian Jewish teacher and translator
- Austin Fernando, Sri Lankan Sinhala civil servant

=== B ===
- Basil Fernando, Sri Lankan jurist, author, poet, human rights activist
- Bayani Fernando (1946–2023), Filipino politician
- Benny Fernando (born 1969), Sri Lankan Sinhala Olympic long jumper
- Bruno Fernando (born 1998), American basketball player

=== C ===
- Chandra Fernando (1942–1988), Sri Lankan Tamil Roman Catholic priest and human rights activist
- Charitha Buddhika (also known as Buddika Fernando, born 1980), Sri Lankan international cricketer (2001–03)
- Chitra Fernando (1935–1998), Sri Lankan female writer and critic
- Clancy Fernando (1938–1992), Sri Lankan admiral and Commander of the Sri Lanka Navy
- C. H. Fernando (1930–2020), Sri Lankan Sinhala general
- C. T. Fernando (1921–1977), Sri Lankan musician

=== D ===
- Damian Fernando (born 1982), Sri Lankan cricketer
- Damian C. Fernando, Sri Lankan naval officer and 27th Commander of the Navy
- Dampath Fernando, Sri Lankan Sinhala Major General
- Devaka Fernando, Sri Lankan born physician and academic
- Dilhara Fernando (born 1979), Sri Lankan cricketer
- Dinesh Fernando, Sri Lankan cricketer
- Dinusha Fernando (born 1979), Sri Lankan cricketer
- Don Fernando (born 1948), American actor and director
- D. T. Fernando (1909–2004), Sri Lankan lyricist

=== E ===
- Elmo Fernando (died 2016), Sri Lankan announcer with Radio Ceylon
- Eric Fernando, SLBC English-language broadcaster

=== F ===
- Frank Marcus Fernando (1931–2009), Sri Lankan Roman Catholic Bishop of Chilaw

=== G ===
- Gratien Fernando (1915–1942), Sri Lankan mutineer

=== H ===
- Harsha Fernando (born 1992), Sri Lankan footballer
- Harsha Suranga Fernando, Sri Lankan physician and politician
- Hasantha Fernando (born 1979), Sri Lankan cricketer
- Hemasiri Fernando (born 1949), Vice President of the Commonwealth Games Federation, Chairman of the National Olympic Committee of Sri Lanka
- Herbert Fernando (born 1933), Sri Lankan cricketer
- Hugh Fernando (1916–1993), Sri Lankan Sinhala politician born in Nainamadama
- Hugh Norman Gregory Fernando (1910–1976), 33rd Chief Justice of Sri Lanka
- Hugo Fernando (1912–1999), Sri Lankan film personality

=== J ===
- Janaprith Fernando (born 1967), Sri Lankan scout
- Johnston Fernando (born 1964), Sri Lankan politician
- Joseph Peter Moraes Fernando, known as Premnath Moraes (1923–1998), Sri Lankan Tamil actor, director, and screenwriter

=== K ===
- K. Priyantha Fernando, Sri Lankan judge of the Court of Appeal
- Kenneth Fernando (1932–2025), Anglican bishop of Colombo, Sri Lanka

=== L ===
- Lalithamana Fernando (born 1962), Sri Lankan cricketer
- Leo Fernando (1895–1954), Sri Lankan Sinhala businessman, Member of Parliament for Buttala Electoral District
- M. E. Lionel Fernando (1936–2024), Sri Lankan Sinhala diplomat
- Lionel Fernando (cricketer, born 1939), Sri Lankan cricketer
- Lloyd Fernando (1926–2008), Sri Lankan Sinhala Malaysian author and professor at the University of Malaya in the English Department
- Luís Fernando (disambiguation), multiple people
- Lushan Fernando, Sri Lankan cricketer

=== M ===
- Marcus Fernando (1864–1936), Sri Lankan Physician, Businessman, Philanthropist and Politician
- Mark Fernando (1941–2009), jurist and former puisne justice of the Supreme Court of Sri Lanka
- Merrill J. Fernando (1930–2023), Sri Lankan teamaker, founder of Dilmah tea
- Meryl Fernando (1923–2007), Sri Lankan Sinhala teacher, trade unionist, and politician
- Milroy Fernando (born 1944), Sri Lankan MP and government minister
- Mignonne Fernando (born 1943), Sri Lankan singer, songwriter, and pianist
- M. S. Fernando (died 1994), Sri Lankan musician
- Murdu Fernando, 48th Chief Justice of Sri Lanka (2024–2025)

=== N ===
- Nalin Fernando (born 1973), Sri Lankan politician
- Nayana Fernando (born 1988), Sri Lankan cricketer
- Nimalka Fernando (born 1953), Attorney-at-law and women's rights activist from Sri Lanka
- Nisal Fernando (born 1970), Sri Lankan cricketer
- Nishantha Fernando (cricketer) (born 1970), Sri Lankan cricketer
- Nita Fernando (born 1947), Sri Lankan actress

=== P ===
- Peter Fernando (1939–2016), Bishop of Tuticorin, Tamil Nadu, India
- Palitha Fernando, Attorney General of Sri Lanka from 2012 to 2014
- Paul Fernando (1951–2020), Sri Lankan Sinhala baila vocalist
- Percy Fernando (1952–2000), Sri Lankan Army officer
- Priyantha Fernando, Sri Lankan puisne justice of the Supreme Court
- Prosper Fernando, Sri Lankan announcer with Radio Ceylon

=== Q ===
- Quintin Fernando (1896–1967), Sri Lankan politician and lawyer

=== R ===
- Rajiv Fernando (born 1971), Sri Lankan American businessman and donor to the Clinton Foundation and the Democratic Party
- Ranjit Fernando (born 1944), Sri Lankan cricketer
- Rohan Fernando (artist), Canadian visual artist, painter, and film-maker
- Rose Fernando (born 1979), Sri Lankan cricketer

=== S ===
- Sajan Fernando, Sri Lankan cricketer
- Samantha Fernando (born 1985), Sri Lankan cricketer
- Saman Piyasiri Fernando (died 1989), Sri Lankan Janatha Vimukthi Peramuna militant
- Simon Fernando Sri Chandrasekera (1829–1908), Sri Lankan Sinhala businessman
- Sirimathi Mary Fernando (1932–1992), Sri Lankan Sinhala cinema actress
- Solomon Fernando (1850–1915), Sri Lankan physician and community leader
- Sujith Fernando, Sri Lankan cricketer
- Suresh Fernando (born 1986), Sri Lankan cricketer
- Susil Fernando (born 1955), Sri Lankan cricketer
- Susitha R. Fernando, journalist and the film critic for a Sri Lankan English-language daily newspaper
- Swithin Fernando (died 2009), Anglican Bishop of Colombo, Sri Lanka
- Sylvia Fernando (1904–1983), Sri Lankan educator and family planning advocate

=== T ===
- Thomas Fernando (1913–2006), Bishop of Tuticorin, Tamil Nadu, India
- Tyronne Fernando (1941–2008), Sri Lankan politician

=== U ===
- Upekha Fernando (born 1979), Sri Lankan cricketer

=== V ===
- Vijita Fernando (1926–2026), Sri Lankan journalist, translator and fiction writer
- V. M. Fernando, judge of Supreme Court of Sri Lanka

=== W ===
- Walter Fernando, 7th Commander of the Sri Lanka Air Force
- Wirantha Fernando (1959–2000), Sri Lankan cricketer

== Fictional characters ==
- Fernando Sucre, from the American television series Prison Break
