= Fernando (disambiguation) =

Fernando is a Spanish and Portuguese given name.

Fernando may also refer to:

== Music ==
- Fernando (Handel opera), alternative title for the opera Sosarme
- Fernando (Schubert opera), Singspiel in one act, composed by Franz Schubert in 1815
- Fernando, opera by Carlo Arrigoni 1733
- "Fernando" (song), a song by ABBA in 1976

== Sports ==
- Fernando Gómez (footballer, born 1965), Spanish football manager and former attacking midfielder
- Fernando Sánchez (footballer), Spanish football manager and former left midfielder
- Fernando Santos (footballer, born 1980), Brazilian football centre-back
- Fernando (footballer, born 1931), Fernando Domingos de Souza, Brazilian football goalkeeper
- Fernando (footballer, born 1954), Fernando Guisini Neto, Brazilian football defender
- Fernando (footballer, born 1967), Fernando Henrique Mariano, Brazilian football midfielder
- Fernando (footballer, born 1974), Fernando Marcelo Campagnolo, Brazilian football defender
- Fernando (footballer, born 1978), Fernando Almeida de Oliveira, Brazilian football midfielder
- Fernando (footballer, born 1981), Fernando Domingos de Moura, Brazilian football forward
- Fernando (footballer, born 1984), Fernando de Jesus Ribeiro, Brazilian football goalkeeper
- Fernando (footballer, born May 1986), Fernando Gomes de Jesus, Brazilian football defensive midfielder
- Fernando (footballer, born July 1986), Fernando Ribeiro Fernandes, Brazilian football attacking midfielder
- Fernando (footballer, born November 1986), Fernando Augusto Azevedo Pedreira, Hong Kong football winger for Kitchee
- Fernando (footballer, born 1987), Fernando Francisco Reges, Brazilian football defensive midfielder for Sevilla
- Fernando (footballer, born 1992), Fernando Lucas Martins, Brazilian football defensive midfielder for Antalyaspor
- Fernando Neto (footballer, born 1993), Brazilian football midfielder
- Fernando Neto (footballer, born 2003), Brazilian football midfielder
- Fernando (footballer, born March 1999), Fernando dos Santos Pedro, Brazilian football forward for Red Bull Salzburg
- Fernando (footballer, born September 1999), Fernando Augusto Pereira Bueno Júnior, Brazilian football left-back for Athletico Paranaense
- Fernando (footballer, born 2005), Luis Fernando Santos Oliveira, Brazilian football forward for Cruzeiro
- CD San Fernando, a Spanish football team
- Club San Fernando, an Argentine multi-sports club in San Fernando, Buenos Aires

== Other ==
- Fernando (Barcelona Metro), a former Barcelona metro station
- Fernando Andacht, a Uruguayan-born semiotician
- Fernando de Noronha, a Brazilian island in the Atlantic
- Fernando, Minnesota
- Cirque Fernando, a former Parisian circus
- E. Fernando, an Indian politician
- Fernet con coca, an Argentinian cocktail also known as a fernando
- Estación San Fernando, a railway station in San Fernando, Chile
- "Fernando's Hideaway", a recurring Saturday Night Live sketch with Billy Crystal satirizing Fernando Lamas

== See also ==
- Ferdinand
- Ferdinando (disambiguation)
- Fernand (disambiguation)
- Hernando (disambiguation)
