= Fernande =

- Gender: Female
- Language: French
- Name day: 27 June (France)

Other names
- Variant forms: Fernand (masculine), Fernanda, Fernando, Ferdinand
- Derived: From the Germanic elements faran ('to drive', 'to travel') and nanþi ('bold', 'daring')

Fernande is a predominantly French language feminine given name. It is the feminine form of the masculine given name Fernand. People bearing the name Fernande include:

- Fernande Albany (1889–1966), French actress
- Fernande Arendt (1891–19??), Belgian tennis player
- Fernande Baetens (1901–1977), Belgian jurist and feminist
- Fernande Barrey (1893–1960), French artist's model and painter
- Fernande Bayetto (1928–2015), French alpine skier
- Fernande Bochatay (born 1946), Swiss alpine skier
- Fernande Brosseau, Canadian social activist
- Fernande Caroen (1920–1998), Belgian freestyle swimmer
- Fernande Chiocchio (1929–2021), Canadian mezzo-soprano, pianist and teacher
- Fernande Decruck (1896–1954), French composer
- Fernande R.V. Duffly (born 1949), Indonesian-American lawyer and jurist
- Fernande Giroux, Canadian actress and jazz singer
- Fernande Grudet (also known as Madame Claude; 1923–2015), French brothel keeper
- Fernande Keufgens (also known as Fernande Davis), Belgian World War II resistance member
- Fernande de Mertens (1850–1924), Belgian-French painter
- Fernande Olivier (1881–1966), French artist's model painter
- Fernande Sadler (1869–1949), French painter and engraver
- Fernande Saint-Martin (1927–2019), Canadian art critic, museologist, semiologist, visual arts theorist and writer
- Fernande Tassy (1903–1952), French fencer
