= Ferdinand =

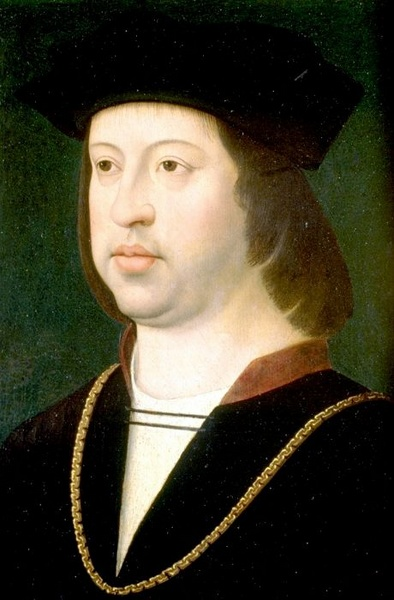
- Ferdinand II of Aragon
- Pronunciation: English: /ˈfɜːrdɪnænd/ FUR-din-and; German: [ˈfɛʁdinant]
- Gender: Male

Origin
- Meaning: 'brave in journey'

Ferdinand is a Germanic name composed of the elements farð 'journey, travel', Proto-Germanic *farthi, abstract noun from root *far- 'to fare, travel' (PIE *par 'to lead, pass over'), and nanth 'courage' or nand 'ready, prepared' related to Old High German nendan 'to risk, venture'.

The name was adopted in Romance languages from its use in the Visigothic Kingdom. It is reconstructed in Gothic as either Ferdinanths or Frithunanths. It became popular in German-speaking Europe only from the 16th century, with Habsburg rule over Spain. Variants of the name include Fernán, Fernando, Hernando, and Hernán in Spanish, Ferran in Catalan, Fernando and Fernão in Portuguese, Ferrand, Fernand, and Fernandel in French, Ferdinando, Ferrante and Fernando in Italian, Ferdinánd and Nándor in Hungarian, and Ferdinand and Ferry in Dutch.

There are numerous short forms in many languages, such as the Finnish Veeti. There is a feminine Spanish, Portuguese, and Italian form, Fernanda (in Italian also Ferdinanda).

== Royalty ==
=== Aragón/León/Castile/Spain ===
- Ferdinand I of Aragon (1380–1416) the Just, King in 1412
- Ferdinand II of Aragon (V of Castile) (1452–1516) the Catholic, King in 1478 (in 1475, jure uxoris)
- Ferdinand I of León (1015–1065) the Great, King of León and Castile in 1037
- Ferdinand II of León (1137–1188), King of León in 1157
- Ferdinand III of Castile (1199–1252) the Saint, King of Castile in 1217 and of León in 1230
- Ferdinand IV of Castile (1285–1312) the Summoned, King of Castile in 1295 and of León in 1301
- Ferdinand VI (1713–1759) the Learned, King of Spain in 1746
- Ferdinand VII (1784–1833), twice King of Spain: 1808 and 1813–1833
- Cardinal-Infante Ferdinand of Austria (1618–1641)

=== Portugal ===
- Ferdinand I of Portugal the Handsome (1345–1383), King in 1367
- Ferdinand II of Portugal (1816–1885), second husband of Queen Maria II
- Ferdinand, Count of Flanders (1188–1233), son of King Sancho I
- Ferdinand the Holy Prince (1402–1443), youngest son of King John I
- Ferdinand, Duke of Viseu (1433–1470), 2nd Duke of Viseu and 1st Duke of Beja, King Manuel's father
- Ferdinand of Portugal, Duke of Guarda (1507–1534), 3rd son of King Manuel I of Portugal

=== Austria and German states ===
- Ferdinand I, Holy Roman Emperor (1503–1564), Emperor in 1556
- Ferdinand II, Archduke of Austria (1529–1595), Governor in the Kingdom of Bohemia in Prague (1547–1567) and sovereign of Tyrol and Further Austria (1564–1595), in Innsbruck since 1567
- Ferdinand II, Holy Roman Emperor (1578–1637), Emperor in 1619
- Ferdinand III, Holy Roman Emperor (1608–1657), King of Hungary and Croatia, King of Bohemia and Archduke of Austria
- Ferdinand I of Austria (1793–1875), Emperor of Austria in 1835
- Ferdinand of Bavaria (1577–1650) Prince-elector archbishop of Cologne, prince-bishop of Hildesheim, Liège, Münster, and Paderborn
- Ferdinand of Fürstenberg (1626–1683) Prince Bishop of Paderborn and Münster.
- Ferdinand, Duke of Brunswick (1721–1792)

=== Italian states ===
==== Naples, Sicily and the Two Sicilies ====
- Ferdinand I of Naples (1423–1494), King in 1458
- Ferdinand II of Naples (1469–1496), King in 1495
- Ferdinand III of Naples – see Ferdinand II of Aragon
- Ferdinand IV of Naples – see Ferdinand I of the Two Sicilies
- Ferdinand I of Sicily – see Ferdinand I of Aragon
- Ferdinand II of Sicily – see Ferdinand II of Aragon
- Ferdinand III of Sicily – see Ferdinand I of the Two Sicilies
- Ferdinand I of the Two Sicilies (1751–1825)
- Ferdinand II of the Two Sicilies (1810–1859), King from 1830 to 1859

==== Mantua and Montferrat ====
- Ferdinand or Ferdinando Gonzaga, Duke of Mantua (1587–1626), Duke in 1612
- Ferdinand or Ferdinando Carlo Gonzaga, Duke of Mantua and Montferrat (1652–1708), Duke in 1665

==== Parma ====
- Ferdinand of Parma (1751–1802), Duke in 1765

==== Tuscany ====
- Ferdinand III, Grand Duke of Tuscany (1769–1824), Grand Duke in 1790
- Ferdinand IV, Grand Duke of Tuscany (1835–1908), Grand Duke from 1859 to 1860

=== Bulgaria ===
- Ferdinand I of Bulgaria (1861–1948), knyaz (prince) 1887–1908, tsar (emperor) 1908–1918

=== Romania ===
- Ferdinand I of Romania (1865–1927), became King 1914

=== Denmark ===
- Ferdinand, Hereditary Prince of Denmark (1792–1863)

=== Lebanon ===
- Ferdinand Tyan, Prince (c. late 19th-early 20th century)

== Other people ==
- Ferdinand Lewis Alcindor Jr., American basketball player who changed his name to Kareem Abdul-Jabbar
- Fernando Alonso (born 1981), Spanish racing driver
- Ferdinand Bol (1616–1680), Dutch Golden Age painter
- Fernand Braudel (1902–1985), French historian
- Ferdinand Budicki (1871–1951), Croatian automotive pioneer
- Ferd Burket (born 1933), American football player
- Ferdinand Coly (born 1973), Senegalese footballer
- Ferdinand Deda (1941 - 2003), Albanian composer, conductor and instrumentalist
- Ferdinand Dennis (born 1956), Jamaican-born writer and broadcaster
- Ferd Dreher (1913–1996), American football player
- Ferdinand Kvan Edman (born 1993), Norwegian middle-distance runner
- Ferdinand Fabra (1906–2007), German football manager
- Ferdinand Foch (1851–1929), French marshal, Allied Supreme Commander in World War I
- Ferdinand Rudolph Hassler (1770-1845, Swiss-American surveyor
- Ferdinand Habsburg (born 1997), Austrian racing driver
- Ferd Hayward (1911–1988), Canadian racewalker
- Ferdinand Hengombe (born 1979), Namibian politician
- Ferran Hurtado (1951–2014), Spanish mathematician and computer scientist
- Ferdinand van Ingen (1933–2021), Dutch Germanist
- Ferdinand Jodl (1896–1956), German World War II general, brother of Alfred Jodl
- Ferd Johnson (1905–1996), American cartoonist
- Ferdinand Kingsley (born 1988), British actor
- Ferdinand Kozovski (1892–1965), Bulgarian politician and general
- Ferdinand Joseph LaMothe, better known as Jelly Roll Morton (1890–1941), American self-styled inventor of jazz
- Ferdinand de Lesseps (1805–1894), French developer of the Suez Canal
- Ferdinand Magellan (1480–1521), Portuguese sea captain (serving Spain), leader of the first expedition to sail around the world
- Ferdinand Mannlicher (1848–1904), Austrian firearms designer
- Ferdinand Marcos (1917–1989), 10th president of the Philippines
- Ferdinand "Bongbong" Marcos Jr. (born 1957), 17th president of the Philippines
- Ferdinand Penker (1950-2014), Austrian painter
- Ferdinand Porsche (1875–1951), German automotive engineer and founder of Porsche
- Ferdinand "Thirdy" Ravena III (born 1996), Filipino basketball player
- Ferdinand de Rothschild (1839–1898), British banker
- Ferdinand Sauerbruch (1875–1951), German surgeon
- Ferdinand de Saussure (1857–1913), Swiss linguist
- C. Ferdinand Sybert (1900–1982), Attorney General of Maryland and justice of the Maryland Court of Appeals
- Ferran Torres (born 2000), Spanish footballer
- Ferd Wirtz (1885–1947), Luxembourgish gymnast
- Ferdinand von Zeppelin (1838–1917), German airship mogul
- Ferdinand Zylka (born 1998), German basketball player

== Fictional characters ==
- Ferdinand von Aegir, a character from the video game Fire Emblem: Three Houses and Fire Emblem Warriors: Three Hopes
- Ferdinand, a character in William Shakespeare's play The Tempest
- Ferdinand Bardamu, the protagonist in several works by Louis-Ferdinand Céline
- Ferdinand, a character from the television series Thomas & Friends
- Ferdinand, the titular pacifist bull in American author Munro Leaf's The Story of Ferdinand as well as a 1938 short film and a 2017 feature film based on the book
- Ferdinand Vaněk, a character in some Václav Havel plays

== See also ==
- Ferd (nickname)
- Ferdy, a list of people and fictional characters named or nicknamed Ferdy, Ferdie, or Ferdi
- Ferdinand Porsche (disambiguation)
- Ferdinando (disambiguation)
- Fernand (disambiguation)
- Fernando
- Fernández
- Hernández
