= Ferrand =

Ferrand may refer to:

- Clermont-Ferrand, a city
- Clermont-Ferrand Cathedral
- Clermont-Ferrand Auvergne Airport
- Clermont-Ferrand Sports Hall

== People ==
- Adèle Ferrand (1817–1848), painter
- André Ferrand (born 1936), French politician
- Antoine-François-Claude Ferrand (1751–1825)
- Élisabeth Ferrand (1700–1752), French salon-holder and philosopher
- Francis Ferrand Foljambe (1748–1815)
- Jacqueline Ferrand (1918–2014), French mathematician
- Jacques Ferrand (c.1575–?), French physician
- Jacques Ferrand (1746–1804), French general
- Jean Ferrand (born 1990), French sportsman
- Jean Henri Becays Ferrand (1736–1805), French general
- Jean-Louis Ferrand (1758–1808), French general and colonial administrator
- Jean-Michel Ferrand (1942–2025), French politician
- Richard Ferrand (born 1962), French politician
- Rufus Ferrand Pelletier (1824–?)
- Suzanne Ferrand (born 1902), French artist
