= Aceves =

Aceves is a Spanish surname. Notable people with the surname include:

- Alfredo Aceves (born 1982), Mexican baseball player
- Carlos Humberto Aceves (born 1940), Mexican union leader and politician
- Daniel Aceves (born 1964), Mexican sport wrestler
- Fernando Aceves Humana (born 1969), Mexican painter
- Gilberto Aceves Navarro (1931–2019), Mexican painter and sculptor
- Gustavo Aceves (born 1931), Mexican artist
- Jaime Aceves Pérez (born 1961), Mexican politician and from 2000 to 2003 Deputy of the Legislature of the Mexican Congress
- Jesús Aceves, Mexican sideshow performer
- Luis Aceves Castañeda (1913–1973), Mexican film actor
- Mauricio Aceves (born 1960), Mexican boxer
- Miguel Aceves Mejía (1915–2006), Mexican actor, composer and singer
- Rafael Aceves y Lozano (1837–1876), Spanish composer
- Roberto Aceves (born 1962), Mexican wrestler
