= Bacciocchi =

Bacciocchi is an Italian surname. Notable people with the surname include:

- Antonello Bacciocchi (1957–2007), Sammarinese politician
- Ferrante Bacciocchi (17th century), Italian painter
- Félix Baciocchi (disambiguation), several people
- Nicola Bacciocchi (born 1971), Sammarinese soccer player
- Simone Bacciocchi (born 1977), Sammarinese soccer player
