= Ferdy =

Ferdy or Ferdie is a given name, often a diminutive of the masculine given name Ferdinand. It may refer to:

== People ==
- Ferdy Sambo (born 1973), Indonesian former police general
- Ferdie Aston (1871–1926), English-born South African rugby union player
- Ferdie Bergh (1906–1973), South African rugby union player
- Ferdy Mayne, German actor born Ferdinand Philip Mayer-Horckel (1916–1998)
- Ferdie Pacheco (1927–2017), former personal physician and cornerman for Muhammad Ali and other boxing champions and TV analyst
- Ferdinand de Rothschild (1839–1898), French-born British banker, art collector and politician
- Ferdie Schupp (1891–1971), American Major League Baseball pitcher

== Fictional characters ==
- Ferdy Factual, aka "Nerdy Ferdy", a supporting character in the Berenstain Bears children's book series
- Ferdie Fieldmouse, Mickey Mouse's nephew
- Ferda Mravenec, a Czech literary and comics character, translated as Ferdy/Ferdi outside the Czech Republic and Slovakia
