= Ferdinand I of Spain =

Ferdinand I of Spain may refer to:

- Ferdinand I of León, (c. 1015–1065)
- Ferdinand I of Aragon, (1380–1416)

== See also ==
- Ferdinand (disambiguation)
