= Ferdinando =

Ferdinando is an Italian masculine given name, and may refer to:

== Politics ==
- Ferdinando I de' Medici, Grand Duke of Tuscany (1549–1609)
- Ferdinando II de' Medici, Grand Duke of Tuscany (1610–1670)
- Ferdinando de' Medici, Grand Prince of Tuscany (1663–1713), eldest son of Cosimo III de' Medici
- Ferdinando Gonzaga, Duke of Mantua (1587–1626)
- Ferdinando Carlo Gonzaga, Duke of Mantua and Montferrat (1652–1708), only child of Duke Charles II of Mantua
- Ferdinando Fairfax, 2nd Lord Fairfax of Cameron (1584–1648), English politician and parliamentary general
- Ferdinando Palasciano (1815–1891), Italian physician and politician

== Sports ==
- Ferdinando De Giorgi (born 1961), Italian volleyball player and coach
- Ferdinando Meglio (born 1959), Italian fencer
- Ferdinando Piani, Italian bobsledder

== Other ==
- Ferdinando di Diano (16th–17th century), Italian mathematician
- Ferdinando Galli-Bibiena (1656–1743), Italian architect and painter
- Ferdinando Galiani (1728–1787), Italian economist during the Enlightenment
- Ferdinando Piretti, an Italian mathematician
- Ferdinando Russo (1866–1927), Italian journalist, poet and lyricist
- Ferdinando Sardella, a Swedish scholar of the history of religion

== See also ==
- Ferdinand (disambiguation)
- Fernand (disambiguation)
- Fernando (disambiguation)
- Ferdinando Eboli, a Gothic tale written by Mary Shelley
