= Château d'Ussé =

Castle in Indre-et-Loire, France

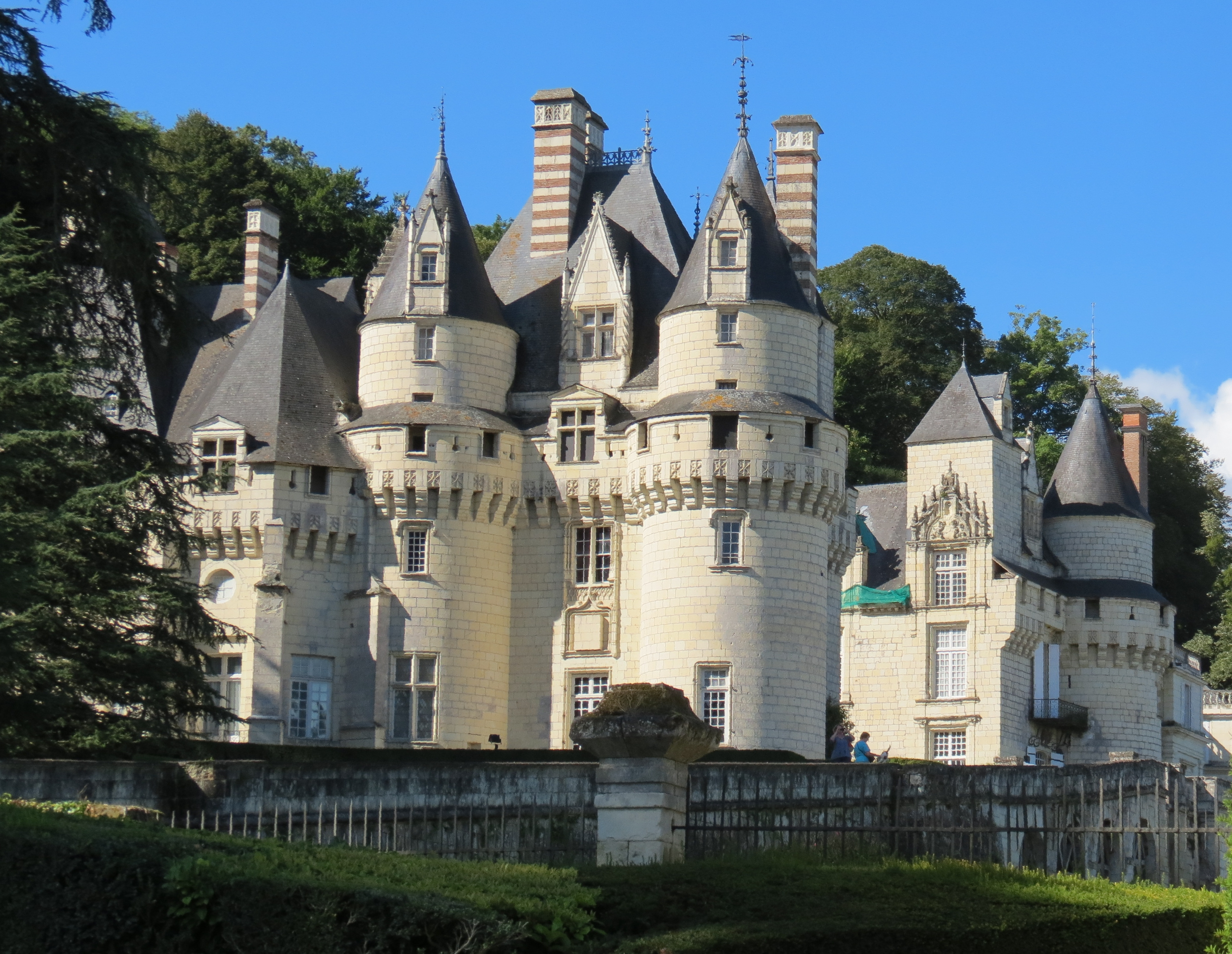
- Main view of the Château d'Ussé and its terraces

- Location within France

General information
- Status: Extant
- Type: Château de la Loire
- Architectural style: Flamboyant Gothic and Renaissance
- Location: Rigny-Ussé, Indre-et-Loire, France, 37420 Rigny-Ussé, France
- Coordinates: 47°14′59″N 00°17′28″E
- Current tenants: Private residence, open to the public
- Construction started: 15th century
- Completed: 17th century
- Renovated: 15th c., 16th–17th c., 1813
- Client: Gueldin de Saumur (11th c. palisade), Jean V de Bueil (15th c. stone rebuild)
- Owner: Duke and Duchess of Blacas d'Aulps

Design and construction
- Architect: André Le Nôtre (terraced gardens)
- Structural engineer: Sébastien Le Prestre de Vauban (military consultations)
- Designations

Monument historique
- Type: Inscrit & Classé
- Designated: 1927 (Inscrit), 1931, 1951 (Classé)

Website
- Official site of the Château d'Ussé

UNESCO World Heritage Site
- Official name: The Loire Valley between Sully-sur-Loire and Chalonnes
- Type: Cultural
- Criteria: i, ii, iv
- Designated: 2000
- Reference no.: 933
- Region: Europe

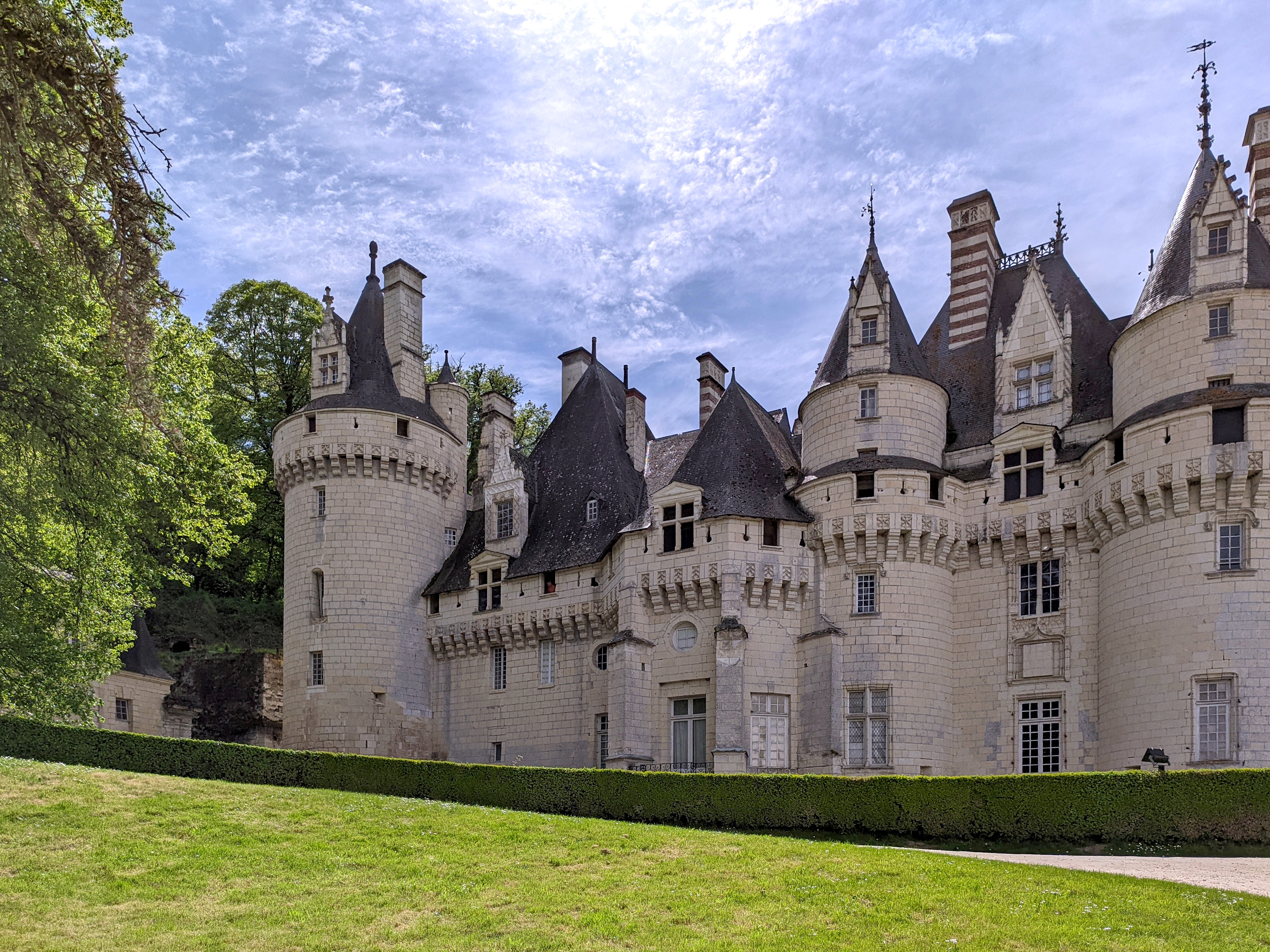
View of the Château's towers

Ussé is a castle in the Indre-et-Loire département, in France. The stronghold at the edge of the Chinon forest overlooking the Indre Valley was first fortified in the eleventh century by the Norman seigneur of Ussé, Gueldin de Saumur, who surrounded the fort with a palisade on a high terrace. The site was passed to the Comte de Blois, who rebuilt it in stone.

In the fifteenth century, the ruined castle of Ussé was purchased by Jean V de Bueil, a captain-general of Charles VII who became seigneur of Ussé in 1431 and began rebuilding it in the 1440s; his son Antoine de Bueil married Jeanne de Valois in 1462, the biological daughter of Charles VII and Agnès Sorel, who brought as dowry 40,000 golden écus. Antoine was heavily in debt and in 1455, sold the château to Jacques d’Espinay, son of a chamberlain to the Duke of Brittany, who, in turn, was chamberlain to the king. Espinay built the chapel, completed by his son Charles in 1612, in which the Flamboyant Gothic style is mixed with new Renaissance motifs, and began the process of rebuilding the fifteenth-century château that resulted in the sixteenth-seventeenth century aspect of the structure seen today.

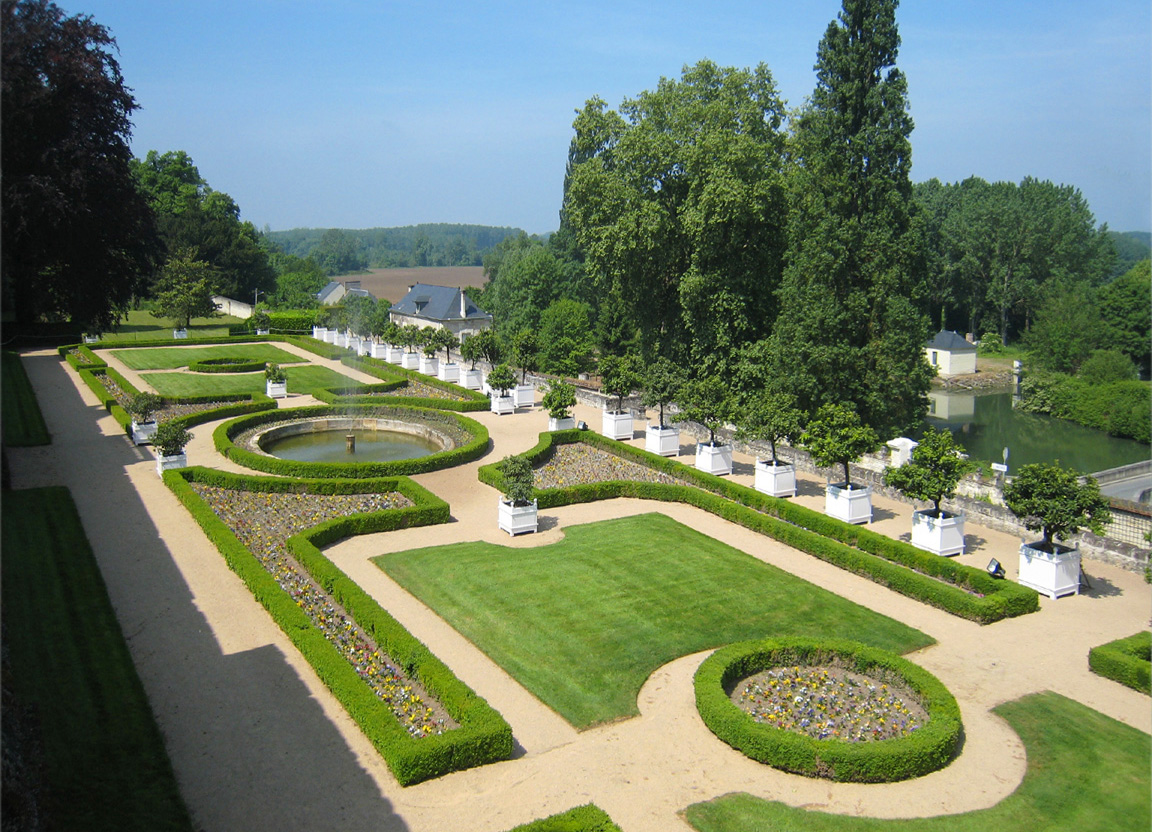
In summer orange trees in caisses line the terrace parterre.

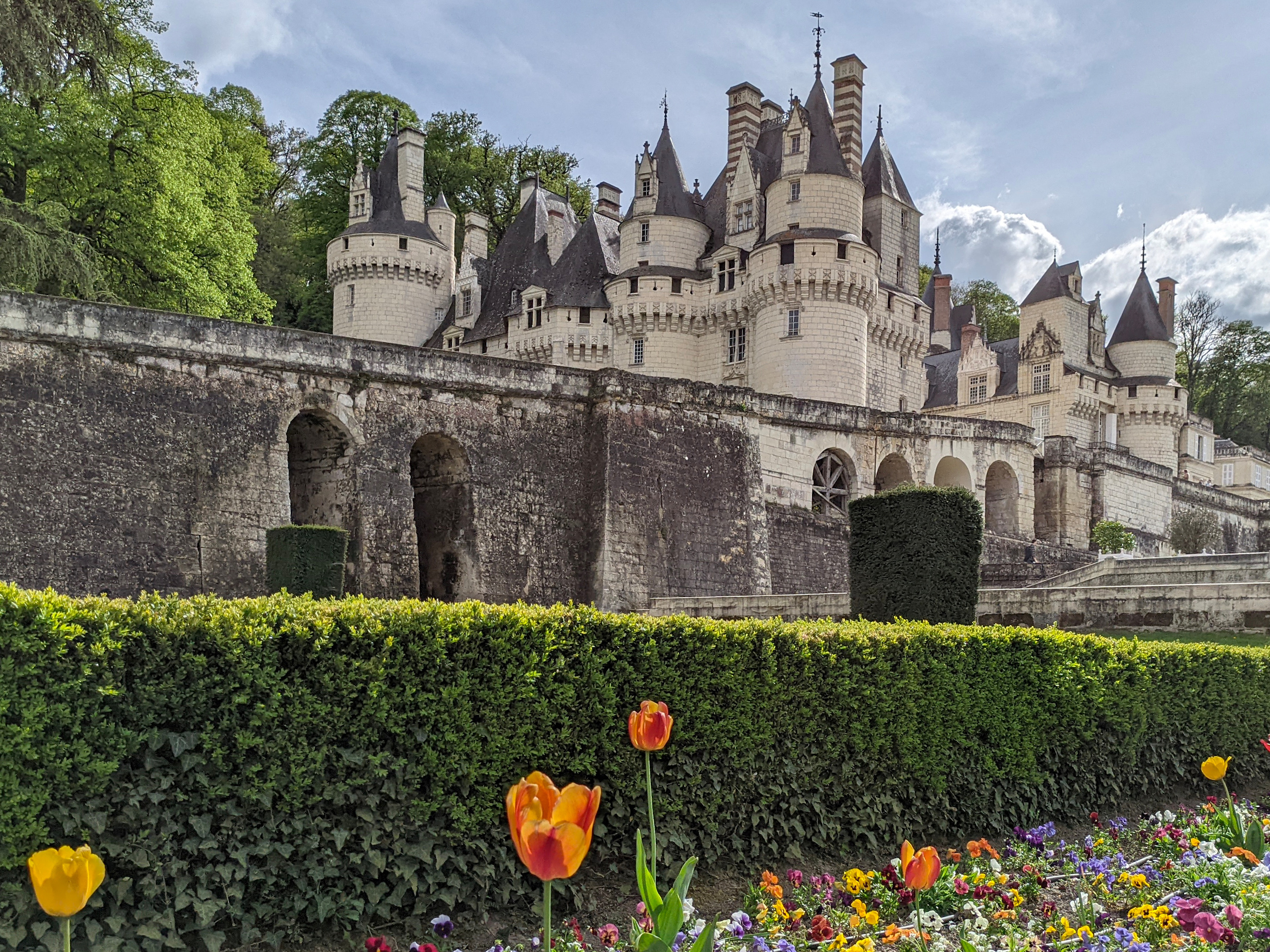
View of the gardens

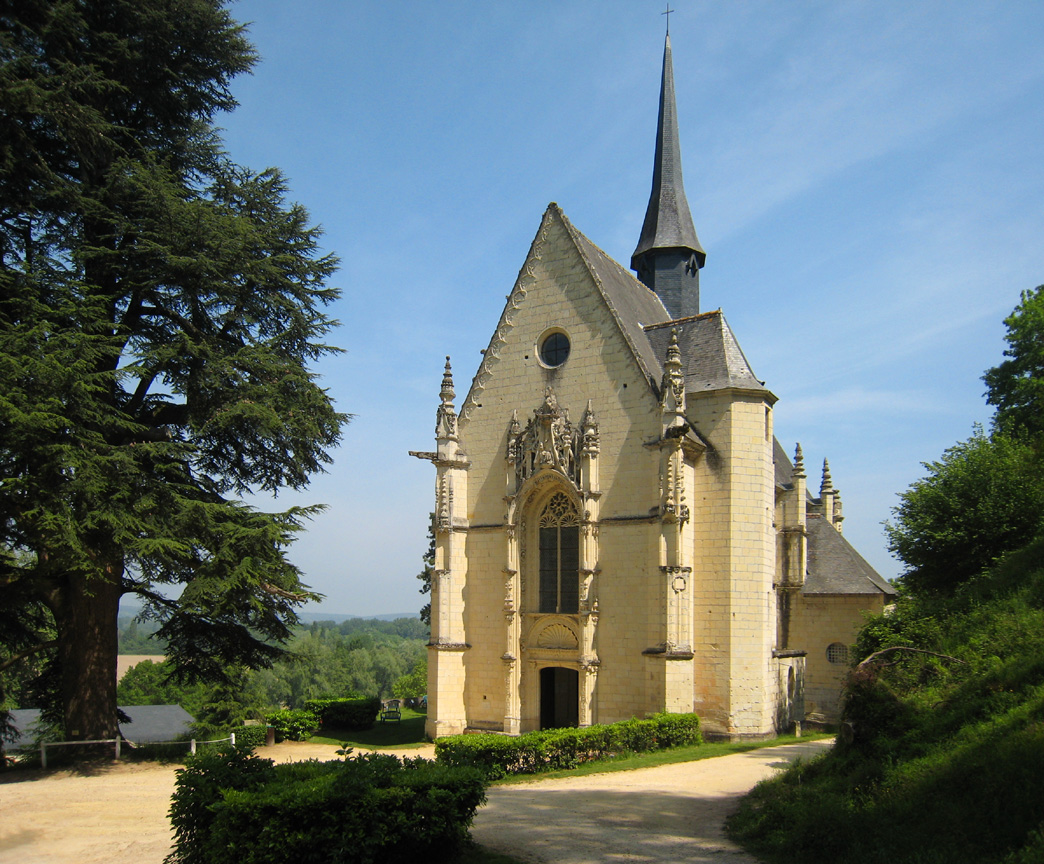
Chapelle Sainte-Anne

In the seventeenth century Louis I de Valentinay, comptroller of the royal household, demolished the north range of buildings in order to open the interior court to the views over the parterre terrace, to a design ascribed to André Le Nôtre. Valentinay's son-in-law was the military engineer Vauban, who visited Ussé on numerous occasions. Later, the castle was passed to the House of Rohan. In 1802, Ussé was purchased by the duc de Duras; as early as March 1813, low-key meetings were held at Ussé among a group of Bourbon loyalists, who met to sound out the possibilities of a Bourbon Restoration: such men as Trémouille, duc de Fitzjames, the prince de Polignac, Ferrand, Montmorency and the duc de Rochefoucault attended. Here later François-René de Chateaubriand worked on his Mémoires d'Outre-Tombe as the guest of duchesse Claire de Duras.

In 1885 the comtesse de la Rochejaquelein bequeathed Ussé to her great-nephew, the comte de Blacas. Today the château belongs to his descendant Casimir de Blacas d' Aulps the 7th Duke of Blacas.

Charles Perrault, author of the versions of several of the most famous fairy tales known today, often visited the castle and was a guest there. He had the castle of Ussé in mind when writing "The Sleeping Beauty".

Famed for its picturesque aspect, Ussé was the subject of a French railroad poster issued by the Chemin de Fer de Paris à Orléans in the 1920s and was one of several that inspired Walt Disney in the creation of many of the Disney Castles.

Ussé was classified as a monument historique in 1931 by the French Ministry of Culture.

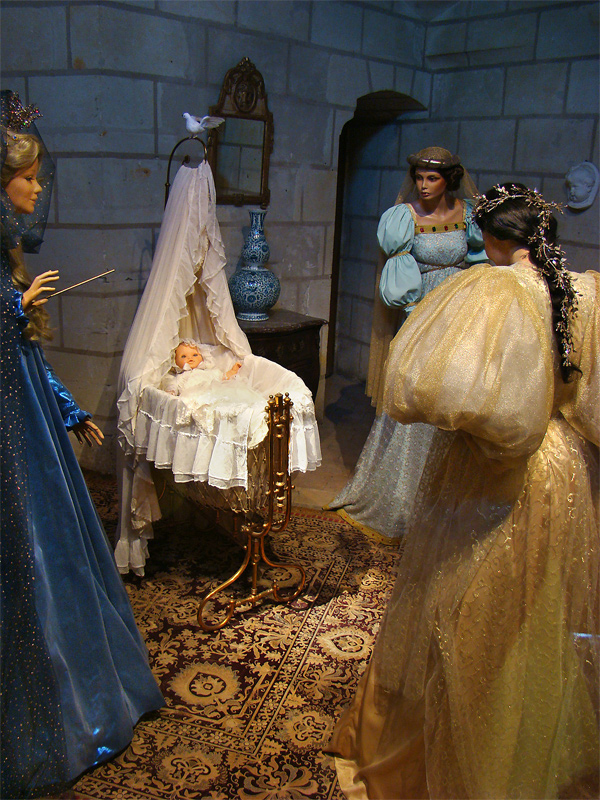
Scenes from Charles Perrault's The Sleeping Beauty

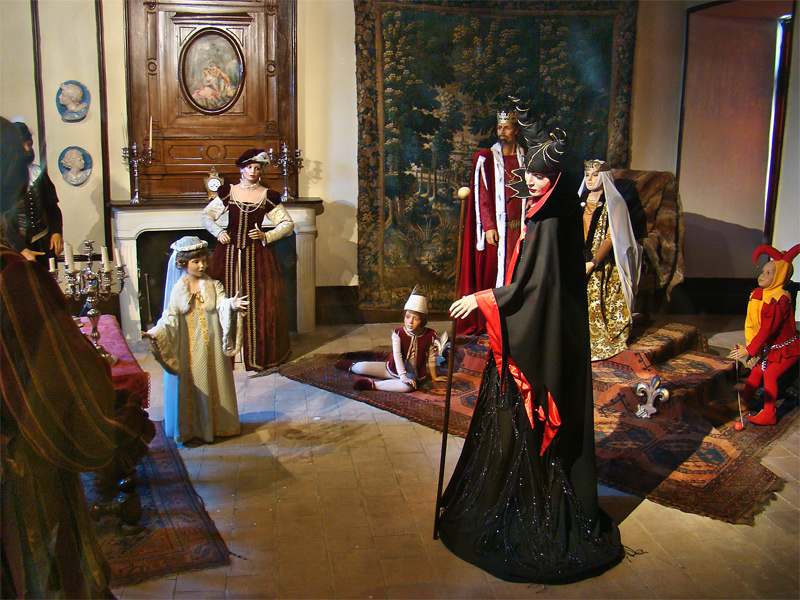

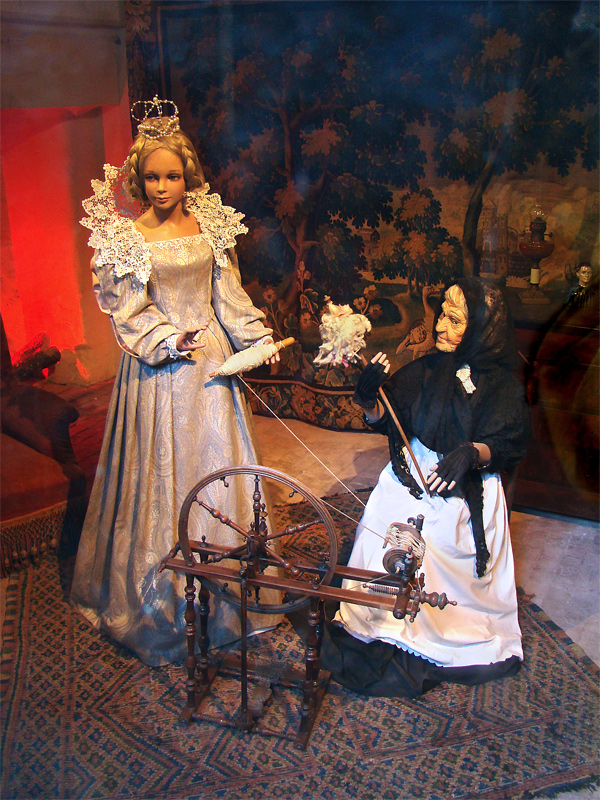

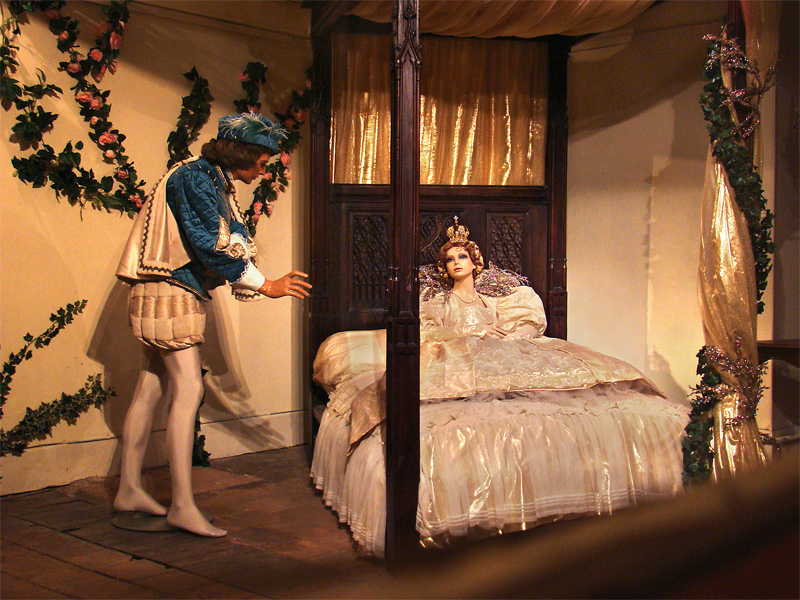

== See also ==
- List of castles in France
