= Fernando González (disambiguation) =

Fernando González is a professional tennis player from Chile.

Fernando González may also refer to:

== Sports ==
- Fernando González (athlete), Paralympic athlete from Cuba
- Fernando González (baseball) (born 1950), Major League Baseball player from Puerto Rico
- Fernando Gonzalez (fighter) (born 1983), American mixed martial artist
- Fernando González (footballer, born 1988), Argentine left-back
- Fernando González (footballer, born 1989), Puerto Rican midfielder
- Fernando González (footballer, born 1994), Mexican defensive midfielder
- Fernando González (footballer, born 1997), Mexican midfielder
- Fernando González (footballer, born 2001), Mexican midfielder
- Fernando González (judoka) (born 1969), judoka from Spain
- Fernando González (swimmer) (born 1950), Ecuadorian swimmer
- Fernando González (volleyball) (born 1989), Venezuelan volleyball player
- Nando González (1921–1988), Spanish former footballer
- Mariano Fernando González (born 1980), Argentine football defender

== Other fields ==
- Fernán González of Castile (died 970), count
- Fernando González, one of the Cuban Five
- Fernando González (writer) (1895–1964), Colombian philosopher
- Fernando González de Bariodero (died 1556), bishop of Nicaragua
- Fernando González Casellas (1925–1998), Argentine composer of classical music
- Fernando González de la Cuesta (died 1561), Catholic prelate
- Fernando González de Marañón (died 1219), grand master of the Order of Santiago
- Fernando González de Traba (fl. 1159–1165), medieval Spanish nobleman
- Fernando González Fernández (died 1419), Spanish Franciscan and diplomat
- Fernando González Gortázar (born 1942), Mexican architect
- Fernando González Laxe (born 1952), Spanish politician
- Fernando González Pacheco (1932–2014), Spanish-Colombian journalist
- Fernando González Roa (1880–1936), Mexican diplomat
- Fernando Gonzalez Sfeir (born 1960), American urologist
- Fernando González Delgado (1947–2024), Spanish journalist, writer and politician
- Fernando González Molina (born 1975), Spanish film and television director
- Fernando González Ollé (1929–2025), Spanish linguist, writer and researcher
