= Hernándo =

Hernándo is a Spanish masculine given name, and may refer to:

- Hernándo Cortés de Monroy Pizarro (1485-1547), Spanish conquistador
- Hernándo Pizarro (circa 1508-1608), Spanish conquistador

== See also ==
- Hernando (disambiguation)
