= Nándor =

Nándor is a Hungarian form of given name Ferdinand. In Old Hungarian, the word nándor signified "Bulgar", but it fell into disuse, probably soon after 1000 AD. It can refer to:

- Nándor Dáni (1871 – 1949), Hungarian athlete
- Nándor Fettich (1900 – 1971), Hungarian archaeologist
- Nándor Fodor (1895 – 1964), British and American parapsychologist, psychoanalyst, author and journalist of Hungarian origin
- Nándor Hidegkuti (1922 – 2002), Hungarian footballer and manager
- Nándor Mikola (1911 – 2006), watercolor painter from Finland, born in Hungary
- Nándor Tánczos (born 1966), member of the New Zealand Parliament, representing the Green Party
- Nándor Wagner (1922 – 1997), Hungarian artist and sculptor
- Nándor, the Hungarian name for Nandru village, Pestișu Mic Commune, Hunedoara County, Romania

Nandor may refer to:

- Nandor (Middle-earth), a division of the Elves in J. R. R. Tolkien's legendarium
- Nandor the Relentless, a vampire in the sitcom What We Do in the Shadows

== See also ==
- Nando (name)
