= Valadés =

Valadés or Valades is a surname. Notable people with the surname include:

- Delio Hernández Valadés (born 1956), Mexican politician
- José Manuel Valadés (born 1953), sailor from Spain
- Fernando Valades (1920–1978), Mexican composer
