= Nando (name) =

Nando is a name for males, popular in Switzerland (Graubünden) and Italy. It is often a short form (hypocorism) of Fernando. It is derived from the Germanic word nantha, meaning bold, reckless, brave.

Other forms are Ferdinand (male; Germanic) and Nándor (male; Hungarian) and Nanna/Nanda/Nande (female).

People named Nando include

- Fernando Altimani (1893–1963), Italian racewalker
- Ferdinando Nando Angelini (1933–2025), Italian actor
- Nandcoomar Nando Bodha (born 1954), Mauritian politician, former Minister of Tourism & Leisure and former Minister of Agriculture
- Fernando Nando Bruno (1895–1963), Italian actor
- Fernando Nando Cicero (1931–1995), Italian film director, screenwriter and actor
- Fernando Nando Có (born 1973), Bissau-Guinean former footballer
- Nando de Colo (born 1987), French basketball player
- Nando de Freitas, Zimbabwean computer scientist and Oxford professor
- Fernando Nando García (born 1994), Spanish footballer commonly known as Nando
- Nando Gatti (1927–?), South African lawn bowler
- Ferdinando Gentile (born 1967), Italian former basketball player
- Fernando Nando Gómez (born 1984), Spanish footballer commonly known as Nando
- Fernando Nando González (1921–1988), Spanish footballer better known as Nando
- Ferdinando Minoia (1884–1940), Italian racing driver
- Fernando Nando Maria Neves (born 1978), Cape Verdean footballer
- Fernando Nando Parrado (born 1949), Uruguayan plane crash survivor
- Fernando Orsi (born 1959), Italian football manager and former goalkeeper
- Fernando Quesada (born 1994), Spanish footballer
- Nando Rafael (born 1984), Angolan footballer
- Nando Reis (born 1963), Brazilian musician born José Fernando Gomes dos Reis
- Miguel Vera (1932–1952), United States Army soldier posthumously awarded the Medal of Honor
- Nando Wormgoor (born 1992), Dutch footballer
- Nando Yosu (1939–2016), Spanish footballer Fernando Trío Zabala
