= Ferdinand (disambiguation) =

Ferdinand is a Germanic given name. For more details including a list of aristocracy see Ferdinand.

Ferdinand may also refer to:

== Places ==
=== United States ===
- Ferdinand, Idaho, a city
- Ferdinand, Indiana, a town
- Ferdinand, Vermont, an unorganized town

=== Elsewhere ===
- Siġġiewi (Città Ferdinand), largest city in Malta by area
- Montana, Bulgaria, formerly named Ferdinand (1890–1945)
- Mihail Kogălniceanu, Constanța, Romania, formerly named Ferdinand I (1930s-1948)
- Nicolae Bălcescu, Bacău, Romania, formerly named Ferdinand (? to 1948)

== People ==
- Ferdinand, European nobility, given name, and characters
- Kareem Abdul-Jabbar (born Ferdinand Alcindor in 1947), American basketball player
- Ferdinand (surname), a list of people
- Ferdinand (dancer) (1791–1837), stage name of French ballet dancer Jean La Brunière de Médicis

== Animals ==
- Ferdinand (horse) (1983–2002), racehorse
- Ferdinand (chimpanzee)
- Ferdinand is a fictional bull in the children's book The Story of Ferdinand

== Other uses ==
- Ferdinand, the main character of The Story of Ferdinand
  - Ferdinand (film), a 2017 animated film adaptation from Blue Sky Studios
- Elefant, a World War II German self-propelled antitank gun originally named Ferdinand, after its designer Ferdinand Porsche
- Ferdinand (moon), an irregular moon of Uranus

== See also ==
- Ferd'nand, a comic-strip character syndicated by United Media
- Emperor Ferdinand (disambiguation)
- Ferd (disambiguation)
- Ferdinand A. Porsche (disambiguation)
- Ferdinand Barnett (disambiguation)
- Ferdinand, Duke of Genoa (disambiguation)
- Ferdinando (disambiguation)
- Fernand
