= Hernando =

Hernando is a common Spanish given name, equivalent to Fernando and the English Ferdinand. It may refer to:

== Places ==
Argentina

- Hernando, Córdoba

Canada

- Hernando Island, British Columbia

United States

- Hernando, Florida
- Hernando County, Florida
- Hernando, Mississippi

== People ==
- Hernando de Soto (economist)
- Hernando de Soto (explorer)
- Hernando de Lerma
- Hernando Cortes, alternate spelling of Hernán Cortés
- Alejandro Hernando (born 1976), Argentine taekwondo practitioner
- Ana María Hernando (born 1959), Argentine visual artist
- Mila Hernando (1957–2017), Spanish diplomat

== Horse ==
- Hernando (horse) (1990-2013), French-trained racehorse, winner of the 1993 Prix du Jockey Club
