= Pelletier House =

Historic house in North Carolina, United States

- Pelletier House and Wantland Spring
- U.S. National Register of Historic Places
- U.S. Historic district
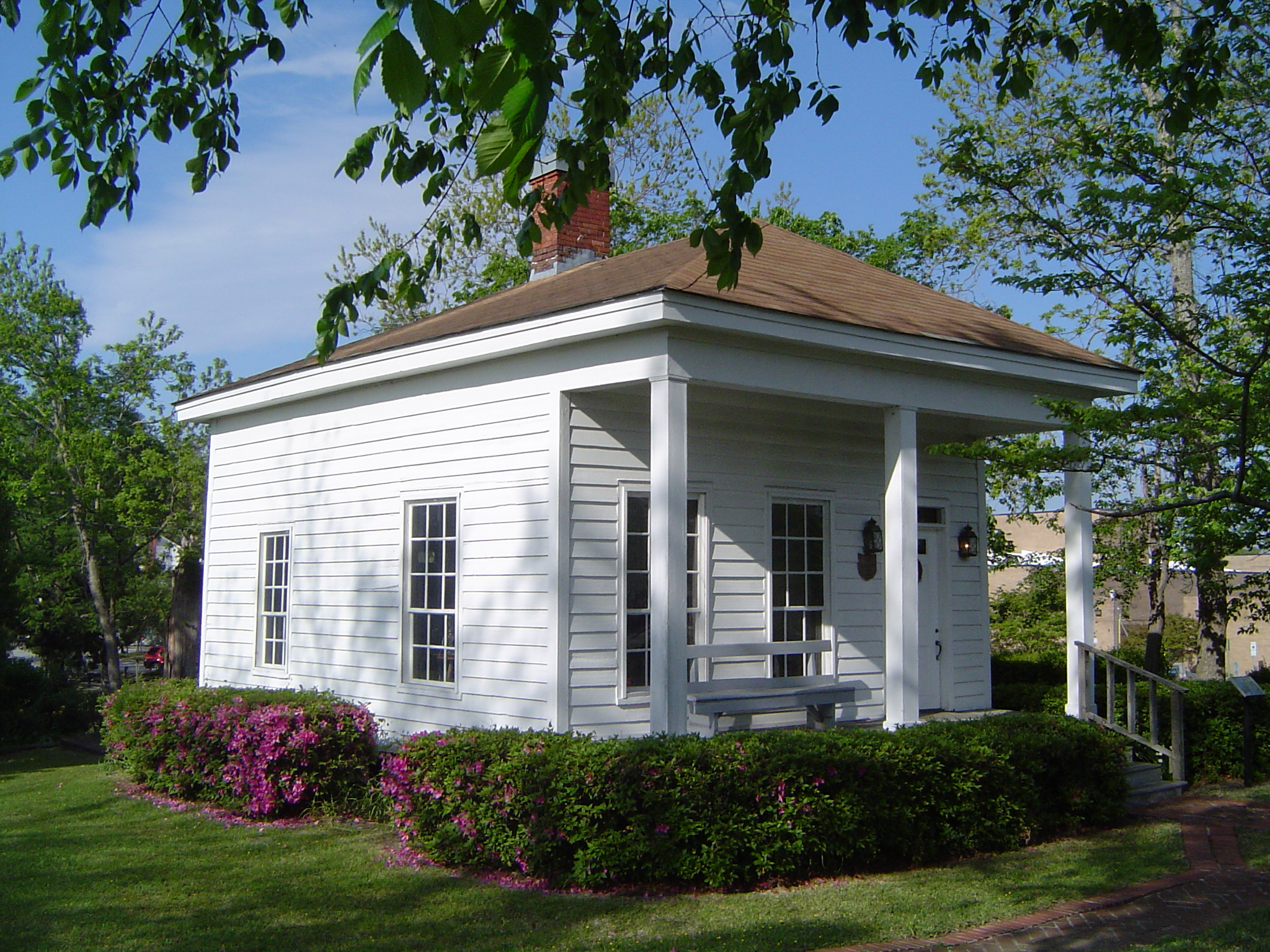
- Pelletier House, photo taken April, 2005

- Location within North Carolina Location within the United States
- Location: Old Bridge St. at New River, Jacksonville, North Carolina
- Coordinates: 34°45′5″N 77°26′2″W
- Area: 0.4 acres (0.16 ha)
- Architectural style: Greek Revival
- MPS: Onslow County MPS
- NRHP reference No.: 89001852
- Added to NRHP: November 13, 1989

The Pelletier House is a historic home and national historic district located at Jacksonville, Onslow County, North Carolina. Built in the 1850s by Rufus Ferrand Pelletier in the Greek Revival style, it sits atop Wantland Spring on the banks of the New River. Initially constructed as a one-room dwelling to serve as home and office, additional rooms were built onto the structure during later years. The house itself was originally part of a turpentine lot owned by Rufus Pelletier and his brother William Pelletier. These rooms were damaged during a fire in the early 1950s. The house was occupied by Pelletier's daughter Eliza until her death in 1954. Subsequently, the Onslow Historical Society acquired and maintained the structure until January 25, 2013, when Onslow County took over ownership. The house is opened for public viewings on special occasions. It is the oldest standing structure in Jacksonville.

Pelletier House was listed on the National Register of Historic Places on November 13, 1989.
