= Fernando García =

Fernando García may refer to:

== Arts and entertainment ==
- Fernando García del Molino (1813–1899), Chilean-Argentine painter
- Fernando García (composer) (born 1930), Chilean composer
- Fernando García Ponce (1933–1987), Mexican architect and artist
- Fernando Garcia (artist) (1945–1989), Cuban-American artist

== Law and politics ==
- Fernando García Oldini (1898–1965), Chilean politician
- Fernando García Cuevas (born 1953), Mexican politician
- Fernando Fernández García (born 1954), Mexican politician

== Sports ==
- Fernando García (fencer) (born 1889), Spanish fencer
- Fernando Garcia (sportsperson) (born 1935), Filipino judoka and wrestler
- Fernando García (sailor) (born 1952), Argentine competitive sailor
- Fernando García Lleó (born 1966), Spanish tennis player
- Fernando Gabriel García (born 1981), Argentine handball goalkeeper
- Fernando García (footballer) (born 1987), Peruvian footballer
- Fernando Garcia (speedway rider) (born 1994), Argentine speedway rider
- Fernando Garcia (soccer, born 1999), American soccer player

== Others ==
- Fernando García de Hita (fl. 1097–1125), Castilian nobleman
- Fernando García Roel (1921–2009), Mexican chemical engineer
- Fernando Luis García (1929–1952), United States Marine and Medal of Honor recipient
- Fernando García de Cortázar (1942–2022), Spanish priest and historian
- Fernando García Sánchez (born 1953), Spanish Navy admiral
- Fernando Soto-Hay y García, Mexican scouting leader
