= Fernando Ortiz =

Fernando Ortiz may refer to:

- Fernando Ortiz Arana (born 1944), Mexican politician
- Fernando Ortiz (athlete) (1905–?), Mexican Olympic sprinter
- Fernando Ortiz Crespo, Ecuadorian ornithologist, namesake of Pristimantis ortizi
- Fernando Ortiz Fernández (1881–1969), Cuban essayist, anthropologist, ethnomusicologist and scholar
- Fernando Ortiz (footballer, born 1977), Argentine football player
- Fernando Ortiz Monasterio (1923–2012), Mexican plastic surgeon
- Fernando Ortiz Wiot (1932–2008), Spanish politician, came into conflict with Francisco Laína
