= Fernand =

Fernand is a masculine given name of French origin. The feminine form is Fernande.

Fernand may refer to:

== People ==
=== Given name ===
- Fernand Augereau (1882–1958), French cyclist
- Fernand Auwera (1929–2015), Belgian writer
- Fernand Baldet (1885–1964), French astronomer
- Fernand Berckelaers (1901– 1999), Belgian artist
- Fernand Besnier (1894–1977), French cyclist
- Fernand Boden (born 1943), Luxembourg politician
- Fernand Bouisson (1874–1959), French politician
- Fernand Braudel (1902–1985), French historian
- Fernand Brouez (1861–1900), Belgian publisher
- Fernand Buyle (1918–1992), Belgian footballer
- Fernand Canelle (1882–1951), French footballer
- Fernand Charpin (1887–1944), French actor
- Fernand Collin (1897–1990), Belgian businessman
- Fernand Cormon (1845–1924), French painter
- Fernand Crommelynck (1886–1970), Belgian dramatist
- Fernand David (1869–1935), French Minister of Agriculture
- Fernand Decanali (1925–2017), French cyclist
- Fernand Dubé (1928–1999), Canadian politician
- Fernand de Brinon (1885–1947), French Nazi collaborationist
- Fernand de Langle de Cary (1849–1927), French general
- Fernand Fédronic (born 1964), French figure skater
- Fernand Fonssagrives (1910–2003), French photographer
- Fernand Gambiez (1903–1989), French general
- Fernand Gignac (1934–2006), Canadian singer
- Fernand Gonder (1883–1969), French pole vaulter
- Fernand Goux (1899–2008), at age 108, French World War I veteran
- Fernand Goyvaerts (1938–2004), Belgian footballer
- Fernand Gravey (1905–1970), Belgian-French actor
- Fernand Gregh (1873–1960), French poet and literary critic
- Fernand Guindon (1917–1985), Canadian politician
- Fernand Halphen (1872–1917), French composer
- Fernand Hautain (1858–1942), Belgian businessman
- Fernand Jaccard (1907–2008), Swiss footballer
- Fernand Khnopff (1858–1921), Belgian painter
- Fernand Leduc (1916–2014), Canadian painter
- Fernand Legros (1931–1983), French art dealer
- Fernand Léger (1881–1955), French artist
- Fernand Melgar (born 1961), Swiss actor
- Fernand Mourlot (1895–1988), French printer
- Fernand Nault (1920–2006), Canadian dancer
- Fernand Ouellet (1926–2021), Canadian historian
- Fernand Ouellette (1930–2026), Canadian Quebecois poet, writer and essayist
- Fernand Paillet (1850–1918), French figurine artist and jewelry designer
- Fernand Pelloutier (1867–1901), French anarchist
- Fernand Petiot (1900–1975), bartender who invented the Bloody Mary
- Fernand Point (1897–1955), French chef
- Fernand Rinfret (1883–1939), Canadian politician
- Fernand Robichaud (born 1939), Canadian politician
- Fernand Seguin (1922–1988), Canadian biochemist
- Fernand Sorlot, French editor and publisher
- Fernand St. Germain (1928–2014), American politician
- Fernand Tardy (1919–2017), French politician

=== Surname ===
- Jeannot Fernand (born 1961), Malagasy politician

== See also ==
- Ferdinand (disambiguation)
- Ferdinando (disambiguation)
- Fernando
- List of storms named Fernand
