= Ferrante =

Ferrante is both a given name and a surname. Notable people with the name include:

Italian nobility

- Antonio Ferrante Gonzaga, Duke of Guastalla (1687–1729)
- Don Ferrante (1423–1494), Ferdinand I, King of Naples
- Ferrante II of Naples (1469–1496), Ferdinand II, King of Naples
- Ferrante I Gonzaga (1507–1557), Italian condottiero (mercenary), Count of Guastalla
- Ferrante II Gonzaga, Duke of Guastalla (1563–1630)
- Ferrante III Gonzaga, Duke of Guastalla (1618–1678)

Given name

- Ferrante Aporti, Italian educator
- Ferrante Bacciocchi, Italian painter
- Ferrante Imperato (c. 1525 – c. 1615), apothecary of Naples
- Ferrante Pallavicino, Italian writer

Surname

- Andrea Ferrante (born 1968), Italian composer
- Ann-Margaret Ferrante (1972–2025), American politician from Massachusetts
- Anne Agius Ferrante (1925–2023), Maltese politician
- Anthony C. Ferrante, American film director
- Arthur Ferrante (1921–2009), of the American Ferrante & Teicher piano duo
- Beverly Ann Ferrante, American politician
- Bruno Ferrante, Italian politician
- Damon Ferrante, American composer
- Elena Ferrante (pseudonym), Italian novelist
- Frank Ferrante, American actor
- Jack Ferrante, American football player
- Jeanne Ferrante, computer scientist
- Louis Ferrante, American writer
- Marco Ferrante, Italian football player
- Michael Ferrante, Australian football player
- Robert Ferrante, American news producer
- Russell Ferrante, American jazz pianist
- Ugo Ferrante, Italian football player
