= Emperor Ferdinand =

Emperor Ferdinand may refer to:

- Ferdinand I, Holy Roman Emperor (1503–1564), Holy Roman Emperor from 1556, king of Bohemia and Hungary from 1526, and king of Croatia from 1527 until his death
- Ferdinand II, Holy Roman Emperor (1578–1637), Holy Roman Emperor 1619–1637, King of Bohemia 1617–1619, 1620–1637, and King of Hungary 1618–1625
- Ferdinand III, Holy Roman Emperor (1608–1657), Holy Roman Emperor from 15 February 1637 until his death, as well as King of Hungary and Croatia, King of Bohemia and Archduke of Austria
- Ferdinand I of Austria (1793–1875), Emperor of Austria, President of the German Confederation, King of Hungary, Croatia, and Bohemia

== See also ==
- Ferdinand (disambiguation)
- Ferdinand I of Bulgaria, Tsar of Bulgaria from 1908 to 1918, by which time the Bulgarian title of Tsar was equivalent to king rather than emperor
