= Hernán =

Hernán is a Spanish masculine given name, originating from Germanic Hernan in the Visigoth culture in Spain. It is the Latinized version of the compound name Fard-nanth, which seems to mean "gentle traveler" or "spiritual traveler". The House of Hernán gave its name to those with the surname Hernández, the -ez at the end denoting membership of that House. The surname, like many Spanish surnames, is of Teutonic-Gothic origin. It is not connected with "Herman" - also of Germanic origin, but a different one.

Persons with the given name include:

- Hernán Alvarado Solano (1946–2011), Colombian Roman Catholic Bishop
- Hernán Andrade (born 1960), Mexican racewalker
- Hernán Barcos (born 1984), Argentine football player
- Hernán Barreneche (born 1939), retired long-distance runner
- Hernán Behn (19th century), Puerto Rican businessperson
- Hernán Bernardello (born 1986), Argentine football midfielder
- Hernán Boyero (born 1979), Argentine football striker
- Hernán Büchi (born 1949), Chilean economist and politician
- Hernán Buenahora (born 1967), Colombian road racing cyclist
- Hernán Caputto (born 1974), Argentine footballer
- Hernán Carrasco Vivanco (21st century), former Chilean football (soccer) manager
- Hernán Cattáneo (21st century), Argentine house DJ
- Hernán Cortés (1485–1547), Spanish conquistador
- Hernán Crespo (born 1975), Argentine international footballer
- Hernán Cristante (born 1969), Argentine goalkeeper
- Hernán Santa Cruz (1906–1999), Chilean delegate to the United Nations
- Hernán Darío Gómez (born 1956), Colombian ex-football player and manager
- Hernán Díaz (born 1965), former Argentine football right back
- Hernán Elizondo Arce (born 1920), Costa Rican novelist and poet
- Hernán Figueroa (born 1927), Chilean decathlete
- Hernán Fredes (born 1987), Argentine football midfielder
- Hernán Gamboa (born 1946), Venezuelan musician
- Hernán Gaviria (1969–2002), Colombian football midfielder
- Hernán Giraldo (born 1948), Colombian murderer
- Adrián Hernán González (born 1976), Argentine football midfielder
- Hernán Gumy (born 1972), Argentine tennis player and coach
- Hernán Iribarren (born 1984), Major League Baseball utility player
- Hernán Larraín (born 1947), conservative Chilean lawyer, university lecturer, and politician
- Hernán Rodrigo López (born 1978), Uruguayan football player and manager
- Hernán Losada (born 1982), Argentine football midfielder
- Hernán Luna (born 1999), Colombian football winger
- Hernán Maisterra (born 1972), retired Argentine footballer
- Hernán Mattiuzzo (born 1984), Argentine football midfielder
- Hernán Medford (born 1968), Costa Rican soccer player and coach
- Hernán Medina Calderón (born 1937), Colombian road racing cyclist
- Jorge Hernán Monge (1938–2019), former Costa Rican soccer player
- Elfego Hernán Monzón Aguirre (1912–1981), President of Guatemala
- Hernán Darío Muñoz (born 1973), Colombian road racing cyclist
- Hernán Neira (born 1960), Chilean writer
- Hernán Nuñez (1475–1553), Spanish humanist, classicist, philologist, and paremiographer
- Facundo Hernán Quiroga (born 1978), Argentine football defender
- Hernán Orjuela (born 1958), Colombian host
- Hernán Padilla (born 1938), retired physician
- Hernán Paolo Dellafiore (born 1985), Argentine-Italian football central defender
- Hernán Patiño (1966–1995), Colombian road cyclist
- Hernán Peirone (born 1986), Argentine football striker
- Hernán Pellerano (born 1984), Argentine football defender
- Hernán Pérez de Ovando (13th century), Spanish nobleman
- Hernán Piquín (born 1973), Argentine dancer and actor
- Hernán Ramírez Necochea (1917–1979), Chilean historian
- Hernán Rengifo (born 1983), Peruvian football player
- Hernán Rivera Letelier (born 1950), Chilean novelist
- Hernán Rodríguez (1933–2026), Chilean footballer
- Hernán Sandoval (born 1983), Guatemalan football striker
- Hernán Senillosa (born 1977), Argentine rugby union player
- Hernán Siles Zuazo (1914–1996), politician from Bolivia
- Hernán Silva (1948–2017), Chilean football referee
- Hernán Toro (born circa 1950), Venezuelan cinematographer
- Hernán Trizano (1860–1926), Chilean-Italian military and police
- Hernán Vodanovic (1946–2025), Chilean politician

In USA without the accent

- Hernan Bas (born 1978), American painter
- Hernan Diaz (21st century) Argentine-American writer

== See also ==
- Ferdinand
- Hurricane Hernan (disambiguation)
