= Fernando Morales =

Fernando Morales may refer to:

- Fernando Morales Martínez (born 1969), Mexican politician
- Fernando Morales (footballer, born 1985), Mexican footballer
- Fernando Morales (footballer, born 1986), Paraguayan footballer
- Fernando Morales (volleyball) (born 1982), volleyball player from Puerto Rico
