= Félix Baciocchi =

Félix or Felice Baciocchi may refer to:

- Felice Pasquale Baciocchi (1762–1841), Corsican brother-in-law of Napoleon I Prince of Piombino and Lucca
- Félix Baciocchi (1803–1866), nephew of the above, chamberlain of Napoleon III then senator
