= Ferdinand Barnett =

Ferdinand Lee Barnett may refer to:

- Ferdinand Lee Barnett (Chicago) (1852–1936), journalist, lawyer, and civil rights activist in Illinois
- Ferdinand L. Barnett (Omaha) (1854–1932), journalist, politician, and civil rights activist in Nebraska

== See also ==
- Ferdinand (disambiguation)
