= Ferdinand, Duke of Genoa =

Ferdinand, Duke of Genoa may refer to:

- Prince Ferdinando, Duke of Genoa (1822–1855), founder of the Genoa branch of the House of Savoy
- Prince Ferdinando, Duke of Genoa (1884–1963), third Duke of Genoa

== See also ==
- Ferdinand (disambiguation)
