= Lushan Fernando =

Sri Lankan cricketer

Lushan Fernando was a Sri Lankan cricketer. He was a right-handed batsman and right-arm off-break bowler who played for Moratuwa Sports Club.

Fernando made a single first-class appearance for the side, during the 2003–04 season, against Singha Sports Club. From the lower order, he scored 4 runs in the first innings in which he batted, and a duck in the second.

Fernando bowled a single over in the match, conceding 6 runs.
