= Dinesh Fernando =

Sri Lankan cricketer

Dinesh Fernando is a former Sri Lankan cricketer. He was a right-handed batsman who played for Nondescripts Cricket Club.

Fernando made a single first-class appearance for the side, during the 1994-95 Saravanamuttu Trophy season, against Moratuwa Sports Club. From the lower order, he scored 12 runs in the only innings in which he batted.
