= Fernando González Ollé =

Spanish linguist and writer (1929–2025)

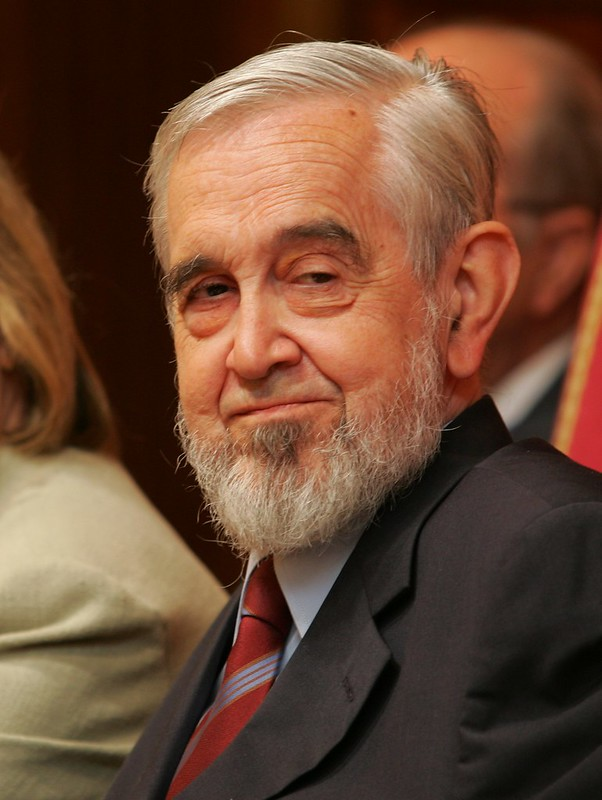
Fernando González Ollé

Fernando González Ollé (4 February 1929 – 18 May 2025) was a Spanish linguist, writer and researcher. He was a Professor of History of the Spanish Language at the University of Navarra and corresponding academician of the Royal Spanish Academy.

== Life and career ==
González Ollé was born in Madrid on 4 February 1929. He studied Romance Philology at the University of Madrid, where he graduated and obtained his doctorate. He died on 18 May 2025, at the age of 96.

== Awards ==
- Menéndez Pelayo Prize, from the Spanish National Research Council (1959).
- Rivadeneira Prize, for research, from the Royal Spanish Academy (1960 and 1963), for two books.
- Grand Cross of Alfonso X the Wise (Royal Decree of 25.VI.1999).
