= Ferran Hurtado =

- Born: 8 May 1951; Valencia, Spain
- Died: 2 October 2014 (aged 63); Barcelona, Spain
- Education: Polytechnic University of Catalonia
- Scientific career
- Fields: Discrete Mathematics, Computer Science
- Workplaces: Polytechnic University of Catalonia
- Thesis: Problemas geométricos de visibilidad (1993)
- Doctoral advisor: Oriol Serra Albó

Ferran Hurtado Díaz (8 May 1951 – 2 October 2014) was a Spanish mathematician and computer scientist known for his research in computational geometry.

== Life ==
Hurtado was born on 8 May 1951 in Valencia, Spain. He earned his Ph.D. degree from the Polytechnic University of Catalonia in Barcelona in 1993 under the supervision of Oriol Serra Albó; his dissertation was Problemas geométricos de visibilidad [Geometric problems of visibility]. It won the Premio Extraordinario de Doctorado UPC in 1995.

He became a professor at the Polytechnic University of Catalonia, and died on 2 October 2014 in Barcelona.

== Contributions ==
Hurtado was a pioneer of Spanish computational geometry, and of connections between computational geometry and combinatorics. He is known, not only for his own research contributions to those subjects, but also for the questions he posed for others to solve. The topics of his research included flip graphs of polygon triangulations, Voronoi diagrams, visibility, simple polygons with given points as vertices, empty convex polygons in point sets, geometric graph theory, and problems on colored sets of points.

== Recognition ==
In 2018, the journal Computational Geometry published a special issue in Hurtado's memory.
