= Ferdinand Penker =

Austrian painter

Ferdinand Penker (born 1950 in Klagenfurt, died 2014 in Farrach) was an Austrian painter.

== Life and works ==
Ferdinand Penker studied medicine and art history in Graz. From 1977 to 1987 he taught as a professor at the University of California, Davis. With his work he has repeatedly asked questions on contemporary art, in particular on structure and order, shape and space, as well as line and color. His working method was characterized by working blocks within which he created individual and progressive series that differed only slightly. In the 90s, he expanded this way of working, with the tendency to a minimalist, monochromatic and radically decelerated painting, in the space. His work is generally assigned to the influence of constructive and concrete ideas, as well as American painting of color fields and of minimal art. Both the canvases and the works on paper by Ferdinand Penker address the painting itself, the process of creation and the different possibilities of perception.

== Selected exhibitions ==
- 2018: Daniel Marzona, Berlin (D)
- 2015: "Ferdinand Penker Gedächtnis–Ausstellung", Museum der Wahrnehmung MUWA, Graz (A)
- 2015: Galerie nächst St. Stephan, Wien (A)
- 2010: "Yamanote", Sclater Street Platform, London (GB)
- 2010: Museum Moderner Kunst Kärnten, Klagenfurt (A)
- 2008: "45 Views of a Square", Machiya Bunka Center, Tokyo (JP); Artist's Lodge, Ratingen (D)
- 2006: "Obraselecta", NOSPACE, Casa Amarilla, San Jose, Costa Rica
- 2003: "A Murder of Crows", Buchprojekt, Landesmuseum Joanneum, Graz (A)
- 2000: 97-99 Sclater Street, London (GB)
- 1984: "A Room With A View", KALA Institute, Berkeley, California (USA)
- 1981: Wiener Secession (A)

== Bibliography ==
- Christine Wetzlinger-Grundnig (ed. ): Ferdinand Penker. The monograph was published on the occasion of the exhibition at the Museum Moderner Kunst Kärnten, 2010, ISBN 978-3-85415-464-8
