= Lapidarium (Aceves) =

- Artist: Gustavo Aceves
- Type: Sculpture
- Medium: Bronze, marble
- Subject: Horses

Lapidarium, also known as Skeletal Horses, is a traveling public sculpture exhibition by Mexican artist Gustavo Aceves. The installation, which addresses immigration, was installed in front of the Brandenburg Gate in Berlin during May 2–10, 2015 to commemorate the 70th anniversary of the end of World War II in Europe. It consists of 22 bronze and marble horse statues that are broken or cracked, and have a skeletal and unfinished appearance. Some pieces include human skulls, representing immigrants who died during their journey. The work's title refers to lapidariums, or sites where archeological findings are exhibited, creating "an association between the fragmented artworks and our shared history and past". After Berlin, the work will be installed with minor differences in other cities around the world until 2017.
