= Sajan Fernando =

Sri Lankan cricketer

Sajan Fernando was a Sri Lankan cricketer. He was a right-handed batsman and right-arm medium-pace bowler who played for Moratuwa Sports Club.

Fernando made a single first-class appearance for the side, during the 2003–04 season, against Singha Sports Club. From the lower-middle order, he scored 8 runs in the first innings in which he batted, and, when taken further down the order in the second innings, scored a duck.

Fernando bowled 6 overs in the match, taking figures of 2-32.
