= Fernando de Araújo =

Fernando de Araújo or Fernando Araújo may refer to:

- Fernando de Araújo (East Timorese politician) (1962–2015), East Timorese activist and politician
- Fernando Araújo Perdomo (born 1955), Colombian politician
- Fernando Araújo (footballer) (born 1972), Uruguayan football manager and former footballer
