= Ana María Hernando =

Argentine artist (born 1959)

- Born: 1959 (age 66–67)
- Education: California College of the Arts
- Website: anamariahernando.com

Ana María Hernando (born 1959) is an Argentine visual artist. Hernando currently lives in Boulder, Colorado. Hernando's artwork includes feminine fiber installations that celebrate the lives and community of Latina women. In addition to fiber arts, Hernando also incorporates painting, drawing, printmaking, and bilingual poetry into her art and installations.

== Work ==
Hernando received her Bachelor of Fine Arts from California College of the Arts (CCA) in 1990.

Her work has been featured at the Oklahoma Contemporary, the Tweed Museum of Art, the Marfa Contemporary, the Biennial of the Americas, the International Center of Bethlehem in Palestine, the Museum of Contemporary Art Denver, the Boulder Museum of Contemporary Art, and at the CU Art Museum at the University of Colorado Boulder.

From January 16 until March 17, 2023 Hernado's mixed -media sculptural installation To Let the Sky Know / Dejar que el cielo sepa is being exhibited in Madison Square Park in New York City.
