= Suresh Fernando =

Sri Lankan cricketer (born 1986)

- Born: Wannakuwatta Waduge Suresh Tharaka Fernando; 7 June 1986 (age 39); Kalutara, Sri Lanka
- Occupation: cricketer

Suresh Fernando (born Wannakuwatta Waduge Suresh Tharaka Fernando on 7 June 1986) is a Sri Lankan cricketer. He is a right-handed batsman and right-arm off-break bowler who plays for Sri Lanka Army Sports Club. He was born in Kalutara.

Fernando made his cricketing debut for Kalutara Town Club Under-23s during the 2007 season, before playing for Sri Lanka Army Sports Club's Under-23 team in the following season.

Fernando made his List A debut during the 2009-10 season, against Saracens Sports Club, scoring 34 runs.

Fernando's first-class debut came in the same week, against Chilaw Marians Sports Club, against whom he scored 10 runs in the only innings in which he batted.
