= Fernan =

Fernan or Fernán is both a given name and a surname. Notable people with the name include:

- Fernán Blázquez de Cáceres (fl. 14th-century), Spanish nobleman
- Fernán Caballero (1796–1877), Spanish novelist
- Fernando Fernán Gómez (1921–2007), Spanish actor
- Fernán González of Castile (died 970), Castilian nobleman
- Fernán Gutiérrez de Castro (1180–1233), Spanish nobleman
- Fernán Mirás (born 1969), Argentine actor
- Fernán Pérez de Guzmán (1376–1458), Spanish historian
- Fernán Pérez de Oliva (1492–1533), Spanish writer
- Fernán Silva Valdés (1887–1975), Uruguayan writer
- Juan Bello Fernán (born 1965), Spanish writer
- Marcelo Fernan (1926–1999), Filipino lawyer and judge
