= Adèle Ferrand =

French painter and draughtswoman (1817–1848)

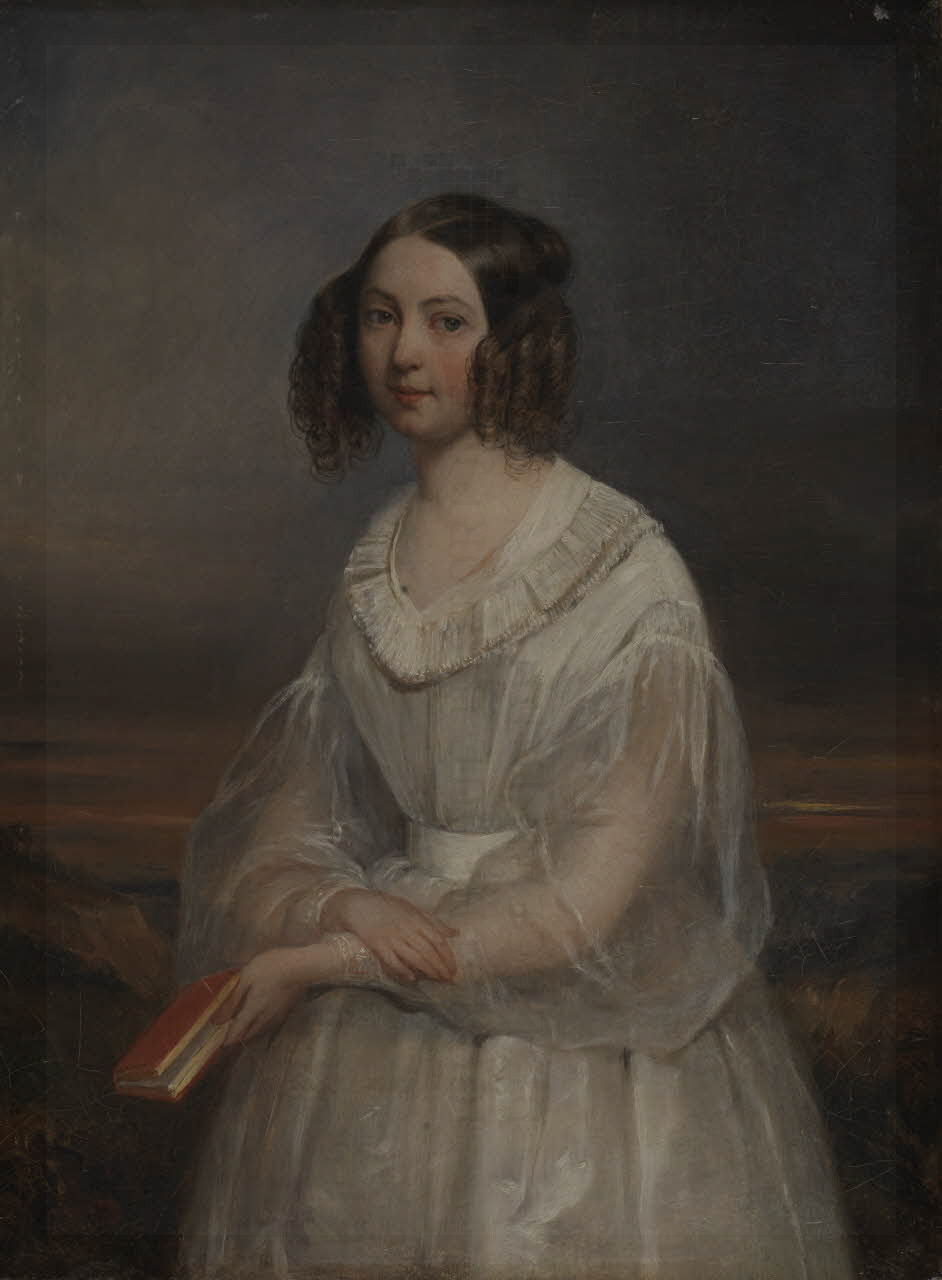
- Adèle Ferrand, Self-portrait
- Born: 20 October 1817
- Died: 1 April 1848 (aged 30)

Adèle Ferrand (20 October 1817 – 1 April 1848) was a 19th-century French painter and draughtswoman on the island of La Réunion in the southwestern Indian Ocean.

Born in Nancy, Ferrand became very early a master of the Romantic school before settling in the colony then called Bourbon to follow her husband, half-brother of the extremely rich Gabriel Le Coat de Kerveguen.

She died at the age of 30 from typhoid fever in the island of La Réunion.

Her paintings and drawings are kept at the Musée Léon-Dierx and available online on the Iconothèque historique de l'océan Indien.
