= Rufus Ferrand Pelletier =

Rufus Ferrand Pelletier (29 March 1824, in Carteret County, North Carolina – ?), was an early resident and principal founder of Jacksonville, North Carolina. Rufus was a grandson of the powerful Carteret County landowner and Revolutionary War veteran William Dennis Sr.

Pelletier moved to Onslow County and settled near Wantlands Ferry where he operated a turpentine distillery along with his brother William. In 1850, Rufus Pelletier constructed a one-roomed structure which survives today, known as Pelletier House. On August 2, 1863 he wed Joana Hines, and together they raised a daughter, Eliza.

Pelletier served as Jacksonville's Postmaster from 1856 until the start of the American Civil War, at which time his brother took over. He then resumed his role as postmaster from 1873 to 1879, resigning to serve as the magistrate of Onslow County. According to local legend, he conducted wedding ceremonies in his home, even though the county courthouse was less than 100 yards (91 m) away.
