= Fernanda =

- Gender: Female

Other gender
- Masculine: Fernando

Fernanda is a Portuguese, Spanish and Italian feminine equivalent of Fernando, a male given name of Germanic origin, with an original meaning of "adventurous, bold journey".

== People ==
- Fernanda Abra (PhD 2019), Brazilian ecologist
- Fernanda Abreu (born 1961), Brazilian singer
- Fernanda Alegre (born 1987), Argentine former professional boxer
- Fernanda Alvaz (born 2009), Brazilian rhythmic gymnast
- Fernanda Auersperg (born 1971), Uruguayan accountant and politician
- Fernanda Brandão (born 1983), Brazilian singer and dancer based in Munich, Germany
- Fernanda Cardona (born 1977), Uruguayan lawyer and politician
- Fernanda Castillo (born 1982), Mexican actress
- Fernanda Contri (1935–2025), Italian jurist and politician
- Fernanda Cornejo (born 1989), Ecuadorian beauty pageant titleholder, crowned Miss International Ecuador 2011
- Fernanda Eberstadt (born 1960), American writer
- Fernanda Festa (born 1981), retired Brazilian rhythmic gymnast and coach
- Fernanda de Freitas (born 1980), Brazilian film, television and stage actress
- Fernanda Gattinoni (1906–2002), Italian fashion designer
- Fernanda G. Weiden, system administrator and a former council member of Free Software Foundation Latin America
- Fernanda González (born 1990), Olympic and National record-holding backstroke swimmer from Mexico
- Fernanda Hermenegildo (born 1988), professional Brazilian tennis player and former member of the Brazil Fed Cup team
- Fernanda Keller (born 1963), professional triathlete from Brazil who was the first Brazilian woman to compete in the Ironman Triathlon World Championships
- Fernanda Lampas-Peralta (born 1960), Filipino lawyer, certified public accountant, and jurist
- Fernanda Lauro (born 1978), Argentine sprint canoeist
- Fernanda Lessa (born 1977), Brazilian top model
- Fernanda Lima (born 1977), Brazilian actress, television hostess and model
- Fernanda Lissoni (born 1980), female water polo player from Brazil
- Fernanda Machado (born 1980), Brazilian film, television and stage actress
- Fernanda Maciel (born c. 1980), Brazilian skyrunner and former environmental lawyer
- Fernanda Marlowe (born 1942), British actress
- Fernanda Montenegro (born 1929), Brazilian stage, television and film actress. First Latin American actress nominated to Academy Awards for Best Actress.
- Fernanda Motta (born 1981), Brazilian model, actress, and television host
- Fernanda Nissen (1862–1920), Norwegian journalist, literary critic, theatre critic, politician and feminist pioneer
- Fernanda Oliveira (born 1980), Brazilian sailor
- Fernanda Oliveira (born 1980), Brazilian ballet dancer
- Fernanda Paes Leme (born 1983), Brazilian actress
- Fernanda Pires da Silva (1926–2020), Portuguese businesswoman
- Fernanda Pivano (1917–2009), Italian writer, journalist, translator and critic
- Fernanda Porto (born 1965), Brazilian singer of Drum 'n' Bossa
- Fernanda Ribeiro (born 1969), Olympic long-distance runner from Portugal
- Fernanda Rodrigues (born 1979), Brazilian film and television actress and entertainer
- Fernanda Romero (born 1985), Mexican actress, model and singer
- Fernanda Takai (born 1971), Brazilian singer, lead vocalist of rock band Pato Fu
- Fernanda Tavares (born 1980), Brazilian model
- Fernanda Torres (born 1965), Brazilian movie, theatre and television actress. 1986 winner of Cannes Film Festival Award for Best Actress
- Fernanda Urrejola (born 1981), Chilean television, theatre and soap opera actress
- Fernanda Vasconcellos (born 1984), Brazilian movie, theatre and television actress
- Fernanda Viégas (born 1971), Brazilian scientist and designer
- Fernanda Young (1970−2019), Brazilian writer, television presenter and actress

== See also ==
- Hurricane Fernanda (disambiguation), tropical cyclones in the Eastern Pacific Ocean
