= Fernande Keufgens =

Belgian resistance fighter

- Born: 14 December 1923 (age 102); Montzen, Belgium
- Military career
- Allegiance: Belgium
- Unit: Army of Liberation
- Conflicts: Second World War

Fernande Keufgens Davis (born 14 December 1923), also known as Freddie Davis, was a Belgian resistance fighter with the Army of Liberation during the Second World War.

== Early life ==
Fernande Keufgens was born in Montzen, Belgium on 14 December 1923, as one of eight children in a close-knit family. She was sixteen years old when the Germans invaded Belgium. Before World War II began, Keufgens's father—who witnessed the horror of World War I—foresaw the Nazi invasion and the subsequent draft into munitions factories. Her father then arranged for her to move further from the German border to Verviers. Two years after the German invasion, however, Keufgens was summoned back to her home; she was ordered to report to a German munitions factory. Keufgens refused, however, to serve the Nazi army; she boarded the train to the factory, and jumped off before it arrived at the work camp to join the Belgian Resistance.

== World War II ==
After jumping off the train, Keufgens walked to her uncle's home. He was working with the Army of Liberation at the time. Despite initially protesting, Keufgens's uncle agreed to her resistance work, giving her a false ID card and counterfeit food stamps. Keufgens became a courier for the Army of Liberation.

Keufgens had numerous run-ins with the Nazis throughout the war. On one such instance, Keufgens was escorting a young boy to a tuberculosis hospital while also transporting ID cards to take to the nuns at the hospital. During confrontations with the police, Keufgens's fluency in German often caused the officers to mistake her for a German. Despite numerous run-ins and working with the Resistance until the end of the war, Keufgens thankfully survived the war.

== Later life ==
About her Resistance work, Keufgens says "I was determined...I was determined to do nothing to help (the Germans) take over the country...you did it once to my father [referencing her father's experience in WWI], you're not going to do it to me."

After the war, she married an American soldier, Bill Davis. The two moved to the United States, settling in Pennsylvania, where Keufgens became a university professor in French. In 2008, Keufgens wrote her memoir called Girl in the Belgian Resistance. She continues to lecture about her wartime resistance work.
