= List of storms named Fernanda =

The name Fernanda has been used for twelve tropical cyclones in the Eastern Pacific Ocean.

- Hurricane Fernanda (1960) – Category 1, paralleled the coast of Southwestern Mexico
- Hurricane Fernanda (1968)
- Hurricane Fernanda (1972) – Category 4, rapidly weakened when north of Kauai
- Tropical Storm Fernanda (1976) Weak Tropical Storm that did not affect land
- Hurricane Fernanda (1981) Category 2 hurricane that not affect land
- Tropical Storm Fernanda (1987) Tropical Storm that did not affect land
- Hurricane Fernanda (1993) – Category 4, threatened Hawaii but weakened northeast of the archipelago
- Tropical Storm Fernanda (1999) – did not affect land
- Hurricane Fernanda (2005) – Category 1 Hurricane, stayed at sea
- Tropical Storm Fernanda (2011) – did not affect land
- Hurricane Fernanda (2017) – Powerful category 4 stayed at sea
- Hurricane Fernanda (2023) – Category 4 hurricane that did not affect land.
