= Ferdie Bergh =

South African rugby union player

- Born: Willem Ferdinand van Rheede van Oudtschoorn Bergh; 2 November 1906 Stellenbosch, Cape Colony
- Died: 28 May 1973 (aged 66) Belville, South Africa
- Height: 1.92 m (6 ft 4 in)
- Weight: 97 kg (214 lb)
- University: Stellenbosch University

Rugby union career
- Position(s): Lock, Number eight
Provincial / State sides
Years	Team	Apps	(Points)
1928–29	Western Transvaal		
1929–32	South Western Districts		
1933–35	Griqualand West		
1936–37	Transvaal		
1938	Northern Transvaal		
International career
Years	Team	Apps	(Points)
1931–38	South Africa	17	(21)

Willem Ferdinand van Rheede van Oudtschoorn Bergh (2 November 1906 – 28 May 1973), better known as "Ferdie" Bergh, was a South African rugby union player.

== Biography ==
He was originally from Stellenbosch, well known as a Springbok rugby breeding ground. He studied at Stellenbosch University, after which he went to Potchefstroom. He played his first provincial rugby for the Western Transvaal and after that he played for four more provinces.

Ferdie Bergh gained 17 caps for South Africa between 1931 and 1938, scoring seven tries in that period.

Willem Ferdinand van Rheede van Oudtschoorn Bergh may hold the record for having the longest name in international rugby, comprising 43 letters in total, including seven words and five names ("Van Rheede" and "Van Oudtschoorn" counting as single names.

He is most famous for scoring the winning try in the only test rugby series ever won by South Africa in New Zealand.

=== Test history ===
No.	Opponents	Results (SA 1st)	Position	Tries	Dates	Venue
1.	Wales	8–3	Lock	1	5 Dec 1931	St. Helen's, Swansea
2.	Ireland	8–3	Lock		19 Dec 1931	Lansdowne Road, Dublin
3.	England	7–0	Lock	1	2 Jan 1932	Twickenham, London
4.	Scotland	6–3	Lock		16 Jan 1932	Murrayfield, Edinburgh
5.	Australia	17–3	Number 8	2	8 Jul 1933	Newlands, Cape Town
6.	Australia	6–21	Number 8		22 Jul 1933	Kingsmead, Durban
7.	Australia	12–3	Lock		12 Aug 1933	Ellis Park, Johannesburg
8.	Australia	11–0	Lock		26 Aug 1933	Crusaders Ground, Port Elizabeth
9.	Australia	4–15	Lock		2 Sep 1933	Springbok Park, Bloemfontein
10.	Australia	9–5	Lock	1	26 Jun 1937	Sydney Cricket Ground, Sydney
11.	Australia	26–17	Lock	1	17 Jul 1937	Sydney Cricket Ground, Sydney
12.	New Zealand	7–13	Lock		14 Aug 1937	Athletic Park, Wellington
13.	New Zealand	13–6	Number 8		4 Sep 1937	Lancaster Park, Christchurch
14.	New Zealand	17–6	Number 8	1	25 Sep 1937	Eden Park, Auckland
15.	(United Kingdom) British Isles	26–12	Lock		6 Aug 1938	Ellis Park, Johannesburg
16.	(United Kingdom) British Isles	19–3	Lock		3 Sep 1938	Crusaders Ground, Port Elizabeth
17.	(United Kingdom) British Isles	16–21	Lock		10 Sep 1938	Newlands, Cape Town

== See also ==
- List of South Africa national rugby union players – Springbok no. 228

== Bibliography ==
- Cotton, Fran (Ed.) (1984) The Book of Rugby Disasters & Bizarre Records. (Compiled by Chris Rhys. London. Century Publishing. ISBN 0-7126-0911-3)
