= Sylvia Fernando =

Sylvia Fernando (1904–1983) was a Sri Lankan educator and family planning advocate. She co-founded the Family Planning Association of Ceylon in 1953.

Sylvia Fernando was born to an elite family in Colombo, Ceylon in 1904. Her mother was a social worker and her father was an obstetrician and gynaecologist.

Fernando was a lead member of the All Ceylon Women's Conference.

Fernando met Swedish women's rights activist Elise Ottesen-Jensen in 1948. In 1954 they found an ally in Swedish ambassador Alva Myrdal and lobbied their governments to try a family planning project. In May 1958, Sweden agreed to provide $80,000 to distribute contraceptives in two communities in Ceylon.
