= Fernando Garcia (artist) =

Cuban-American artist (1945–1989)

Fernando García (1945–1989) was a Cuban-American conceptual artist, educator, and community organizer known for his interdisciplinary work and civic engagement in Miami, Florida. A prominent member of the Miami Generation, García's work blended mathematics, installation, and public art, often involving participatory and site-specific components.

== Early life and education ==
Fernando García was born in the La Víbora neighborhood of Havana, Cuba, in 1945. He emigrated to the United States in 1961 at the age of sixteen through Operation Pedro Pan, a program that brought unaccompanied Cuban minors to the U.S. to escape political unrest. García attended Belen Jesuit Preparatory School and Miami-Dade College, North Campus, before relocating to Georgia.

He earned a Bachelor of Science in Physics and Mathematics from the University of Georgia in Athens in 1968. Between 1972 and 1976, he pursued formal training in visual art at Georgia State University in Atlanta, where he completed a Master of Fine Arts in Drawing and Painting.

== Artistic career ==
García was an interdisciplinary and conceptual artist whose work often integrated elements of civic life and public participation. His artistic approach was deeply influenced by his background in mathematics and physics, manifesting in systematic and time-based installations.

He held over ten solo exhibitions and participated in numerous group shows during his career. Notable solo exhibitions included:

- On the Line: A Simultaneous Exhibition (Key West and Coral Gables)
- Miami Magic (Metro-Dade Cultural Center)
- Aries. Installation (Albany Museum of Art)

García's work was featured in The Miami Generation (1983), a landmark group exhibition curated by art critic Giulio V. Blanc at the Cuban Museum of Arts and Culture, showcasing a new wave of Cuban-American artists in South Florida.

His public and civic-based art projects included:

- Holiday Spheres, floating installations for the opening of the Miami-Dade Cultural Center
- Miami Reading Symphony, a project that activated the city's literary community through performances at the Miami-Dade Public Library
- Making Purple, a neon installation at the Okeechobee Metrorail Station, commissioned through Miami-Dade's Art in Public Places program

== Teaching and community engagement ==
García was a dedicated educator and taught art at both Miami-Dade Community College and the International Fine Arts College (now Miami International University of Art & Design). He was known for bringing artmaking to diverse communities, fostering access to the arts beyond traditional gallery spaces.

== Awards and collections ==
García received several prestigious awards during his lifetime, including:

- CINTAS Fellowship for Visual Arts (Institute of International Education, New York, 1978–79)
- Individual Artist Fellowship from the Florida State Council on the Arts (1983)

His work is held in permanent collections at:

- Miami-Dade Public Library System
- Miami Dade College
- Museum of Art, Fort Lauderdale (now NSU Art Museum Fort Lauderdale)

== Legacy and posthumous recognition ==
Fernando García died in 1989 in Miami from complications related to AIDS. His death occurred during a period when the AIDS epidemic was having a significant and deadly impact on Miami's arts community.

In 2024, his life and work were revisited in the posthumous solo exhibition Fernando Garcia: Calendars and Gradation Systems. The exhibition, curated by Isabella Marie Garcia as part of the Visual AIDS Research Fellowship, explored the artist's use of time, mathematics, and site-specific installation. Held in partnership with the Miami-Dade Main Library, the exhibition included archival materials, recreated installations, and programming reflecting on the AIDS crisis and García's contributions to art and education in South Florida.
