= Fernando (footballer, born 1954) =

Brazilian footballer (1954–2026)

Personal information
- Full name: Fernando Guisini Neto
- Date of birth: 8 March 1954
- Place of birth: Lençóis Paulista, São Paulo, Brazil
- Date of death: 22 July 2026 (aged 72)
- Place of death: Bauru, São Paulo, Brazil
- Position: Centre-back

Youth career
- Comercial-SP

Senior career*
Years	Team	Apps	(Gls)
1974–1975	Comercial-SP		
1975–1979	Santos		
1979–1982	Londrina		
1982	Náutico		
1983–1985	Marília		
1986–1987	Guarani		
1987	Atlético-PR		
1988–1989	União São João		
1989	Nacional-SP		
1990	Sãocarlense		
1991	Bandeirante		
1991	Paraguaçuense		
1992	Matonense		

Managerial career
- 1993: VOCEM
- 1997: Marília (youth)
- 2001: VOCEM
- 2002: Paraguaçuense
- 2004: Taquaritinga
- 2004–2007: Joseense
- 2008: Flamengo de Pirajuí
- 2009: CENE (U20)
- 2009: CAL Bariri
- 2011–2012: Marília (U20)
- 2012: Assisense (U20)
- 2022: Náutico-RR (U20)
- 2022: Náutico-RR
- * Club domestic league appearances and goals

Fernando Guisini Neto (8 March 1954 – 22 July 2026), also known as Fernando, Fernando Guisini, Fernando Nariz or Fernando Narigudo, was a Brazilian professional footballer and manager who played as centre-back.

== Career ==
Having started his career at Comercial-SP, Fernando played the majority of his career at Santos, where he made 256 appearances and won the state championship in 1978. He later played for Londrina, where he again won the state championship as well as the Série B title in 1980. He also played for Náutico, Atlético-PR, Guarani, and clubs from the counrryside of São Paulo state. Fernando also worked as a coach, primarily with teams from the interior and U-20 squads, such as CENE during the 2009 Copa São Paulo de Futebol Jr. His last work as manager was with Náutico-RR in the 2022 Campeonato Brasileiro Série D.

== Death ==
Fernando died on 22 July 2026, in Bauru, São Paulo, where he had been hospitalized since February. He was 72.

== Honours ==
Santos

- Campeonato Paulista: 1978

Londrina

- Campeonato Brasileiro Série B: 1980
- Campeonato Paranaense: 1981
