= Suzanne Ferrand =

French artist

- Born: 1902
- Notable work: "Grow Wheat, It is Gold for France"; "Save your Wine for Our Soldiers"

Suzanne Ferrand (born 1902) was a French artist and illustrator. She illustrated two World War I posters. One was titled (in French), "Grow Wheat, It is Gold for France." It prominently features wheat, a sickle, and the French flag. The second poster released in 1918, was titled (in French), "Save Your Wine For Our Soldiers." On the poster is a wine jug, a vine of grapes, and a cup filled with wine.

Her contemporaries were artists Celia Fiennes, Vera Allison, Theodor Baumgartner, Francesco De Rocchi, and William Beattie.
