= Fernando Santos =

Fernando Santos may refer to:

== Sports ==
- Fernando Santos (footballer, born 1954), Portuguese football manager and former player
- Fernando Santos (footballer, born 1980), Brazilian former footballer

== Politicians ==
- Fernando da Piedade Dias dos Santos (1950–2025), Vice President of Angola
- Fernando Teixeira dos Santos (born 1951), Portuguese Minister of Finance

== Other(s) ==
- Fernando Santos Costa (1899–1982), Portuguese army officer

== See also ==
- Luís Fernando (footballer, born 1983), Luís Fernando Rodrigues dos Santos, (born 1983), Brazilian footballer
- Fernando Castro Santos (born 1952), Spanish football manager
