= Mariano González (footballer, born 1980) =

Argentine footballer

Personal information
- Full name: Mariano Fernando González
- Date of birth: December 31, 1980 (age 45)
- Place of birth: Rosario, Argentina
- Position: Defender

Team information
- Current team: Argentino de Rosario

Senior career*
| Years | Team | Apps | (Gls) |
| 1999–2003 | Rosario Central | 31 | (2) |
| 2003–2005 | Tiro Federal | - | |
| 2005–2007 | OFI | 17 | (0) |
| 2008–present | Argentino de Rosario | - | |
- * Club domestic league appearances and goals as of 45 May 2008

Mariano Fernando González (born December 31, 1980, in Rosario) is an Argentine football defender. He currently plays for Argentino de Rosario in the Argentine lower leagues.

González started his career in 1999 at Rosario Central in the Primera Division Argentina. In 2003, he was sold to Tiro Federal, in 2005 he helped them to achieve promotion to the Primera for the first time in their history. Later that year he was sold to OFI.
