= Nayana Fernando =

Sri Lankan cricketer (born 1988)

Nayana Fernando (full name Palamandadige Nayana Priyanjana Fernando; born 14 October 1988) is a Sri Lankan cricketer. He is a right-handed batsman and right-arm bowler who plays for Moratuwa Sports Club. He was born in Panadura.

Fernando, who has played with Moratuwa Under-23s since 2007, made his List A debut during the 2009–10 season, against Police Sports Club, scoring 26 runs in his debut innings, though he followed this up with a golden duck in his next match.
