= Fernando Morales (footballer, born 1986) =

Paraguayan footballer

Personal information
- Full name: Fernando Ismael Rodríguez Morales
- Date of birth: 17 January 1986 (age 40)
- Place of birth: Caacupé, Paraguay
- Height: 1.79 m (5 ft 10 in)
- Position: Midfielder

Youth career
- Cerro Porteño

Senior career*
| Years | Team | Apps | (Gls) |
| 2005 | Cerro Porteño | | |
| 2006–2007 | Zagłębie Lubin | 0 | (0) |
| 2007 | → Śląsk Wrocław (loan) | 11 | (0) |
| 2008 | Fernando de la Mora | | |
| 2009 | 12 de Octubre | | |
- * Club domestic league appearances and goals

Fernando Ismael Rodríguez Morales (born 17 January 1986) is a Paraguayan former professional footballer who played as a midfielder.
