= Aron Fernando =

Italian Jewish teacher and translator (1761–1828)

- Born: 1761; Livorno
- Died: 1828 (aged 66–67)

Aron (Aaron) Fernandez (or Fernandes according to some sources, or Fernando, as he authored) (Livorno, 1761–1828) was a Jewish-Italian teacher of ancient and new languages, and a translator. He was considered an extremist by the civil and religious (Jewish and Christian) authorities of Livorno because of his Jacobin sympathies.

== Life ==
In 1796, radical German Jews fabricated a story of Italian Jewish rabbi meeting at a synod in Florence and making very extreme changes to Jewish law regarding the Sabbath, dietary restrictions and sexual relations. Most Italian Jews condemned and denied these accusations, but some extremist Jews like Fernando and Mosè Formiggini pushed for open discussions on these issues. The Jewish community of Livorno acted in concert with the town's bishop to censor works by Fernando. From 1799 to 1801, Fernando was one of the Jewish radicals exiled by the government. In 1810, Fernando published a book which advocated for the repeal of many of the 613 commandments, and for a complete reform the Jewish faith, turning it into a deistic faith.

== Works ==
Fernando is known through the official reprimands to his writings, some of which he managed to publish. Among them:

- an annotated Italian translation of Les Nuits Champêtres by Jean-Charles Thibault de Laveaux, written in 1792 and eventually published only in 1803.
- Lo spettatore libero ovvero speculazioni filosofiche sulla rigenerazione politica, e morale dello spirito umano (The Free Spectator, Or Philosophical Speculation On Political Regeneration, And The Morality Of The Human Spirit). Published in Milan, anno II della Libertà (1793).
- an Italian translation of Tom Paine's pamphlet Decline and Fall of the English System of Finance. On 29 June 1796, Fernando even managed to meet Napoleon passing through Livorno, to request for his support for the work. The translation was ultimately not published, but Fernando was expelled from Livorno because of it.
- The Progetto filosofico di una completa riforma del culto e dell'educazione politico-morale del popolo ebreo, a radical proposal for the reform of Judaism, announced to appear in two tomes by 1810. The first volume was indeed surreptitiously printed in 1813 by Marenigh in Livorno; after a long series of remands to the censor, which lasted till 1818, and with the changing political climate of the Restoration, almost all printed copies were confiscated and destroyed. The manuscript of the second tome, submitted to the French censor, is conserved at the French National Archives in Paris.
