= Pristimantis ortizi =

Conservation status
- Data Deficient (IUCN 3.1)

Scientific classification
- Kingdom: Animalia
- Phylum: Chordata
- Class: Amphibia
- Order: Anura
- Family: Strabomantidae
- Genus: Pristimantis
- Subgenus: Pristimantis
- Species: P. ortizi

Binomial name
- Pristimantis ortizi (Guayasamin, Almeida-Reinoso, and Nogales-Sornosa, 2004)

Synonyms
- Eleutherodactylus ortizi Guayasamin, Almeida-Reinoso, and Nogales-Sornosa, 2004

Species of amphibian

Pristimantis ortizi is a species of frog in the family Strabomantidae. As currently known, it is endemic to northern Ecuador where it occurs on the Cordillera Oriental in the Carchi, Imbabura, and Napo Provinces, but it is likely to also occur in adjacent Colombia. The specific name ortizi honors Fernando Ortiz-Crespo, a prominent Ecuadorian ornithologist. Common names Ortiz robber frog and Ortiz's robber frog have been proposed for this species.

== Description ==
Adult males measure 18–25 mm (0.7–1.0 in) and adult females 24–29 mm (0.9–1.1 in) in snout–vent length. The head is narrower than body and wider than it is long. The tympanum is anteroventrally distinct but otherwise obscured by the supratympanic fold. Fingers have basal webbing and, apart from the first one, expanded discs. All the toes have well-developed discs. Coloration is remarkably variable; the dorsum can be uniform brown or greenish yellow, pale brown with gold specks, or yellow with dark brown marks. Flanks can be brown with white spots, dark grey with greenish yellow spots, or simply yellow.

== Habitat and conservation ==
Pristimantis ortizi occurs in montane evergreen forest, herbaceous or Espeletia pycnophylla ssp. angelensis dominated páramo, secondary montane forest, and agricultural land. Most specimens have been found at night in terrestrial bromeliads, on other plants, or on the ground. Presumably, development is direct (i.e., there is no free-living larval stage). Its elevational range is 3,264–3,420 m (10,709–11,220 ft) above sea level.

This species could be threatened by habitat alteration, but it appears to tolerate some degree of habitat modification. It is probably present in the Cayambe Coca Ecological Reserve.
