= Rafael Aceves y Lozano =

Spanish composer

Rafael Aceves y Lozano (20 March 1837 – 21 February 1876) was a Spanish composer. He studied at the Madrid Conservatory, earning a gold medal in 1863. He was especially known for his sacred music compositions of which his Stabat Mater is the best known.

Together with a colleague composer, Llanos, he composed the opera El Puñal de la Misericordia in 1869, with which he was again recognized with a medal. He went on to compose a number of zarzuela, including La bola negra, Sensitiva (1870), a collaborative composition, El trono de Escocia, with Manuel Fernández Caballero, and El Testamento Azul with Francisco Asenjo Barbieri. He also wrote the opera El manco de Lepanto - Episodio histórico en un acto y en verso (1867) in homage to Miguel de Cervantes, telling the story of the writer's captivity and release in Algiers. He also composed a parody of Cristóbal Oudrid's El molinero de Subiza entitled El carbonero de Subiza.
