= Félix Baciocchi (1803–1866) =

French politician

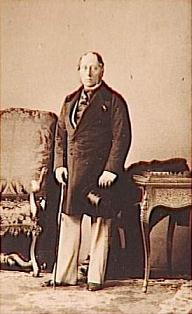
Photograph of Félix Baciocchi

Félix Baciocchi (2 March 1803 – 23 September 1866) was a French politician. Nephew of Felice Pasquale Bacciocchi, Napoleon I's brother in law, he was first chamberlain to Napoleon III, then surintendant des spectacles de la cour ("director of court spectacles"), surintendant général des théâtres de l'Empire ("director of the theatres of the Empire") and finally (from 5 March 1866) a senator.
