= Susitha R. Fernando =

Susitha R. Fernando is a journalist and the film critic for a Sri Lankan English-language daily newspaper the Daily Mirror and its Sunday weekly edition, The Sunday Times, based in Colombo, Sri Lanka.

== Education and training ==
Fernando is from Colombo, Sri Lanka. In 2005, while an undergraduate, he took part in the 34th International Film Festival Rotterdam (IFFR)'s training program for young film critics.

At that time he became the film critic for the Daily Mirror, an English daily newspaper in Sri Lanka.

He has reported on film and other news stories for the Sri Lanka Daily Mirror and its weekly Sunday newspaper, The Sunday Times.

== Controversy ==
One of his news accounts, entitled "Officers Suffer from NGO-backed Offenders' False Accusation" and published in the Daily Mirror on 8 November 2006, became the subject of a press release and letter to the editor submitted by the Asian Human Rights Commission on the same day.
