= Sujith Fernando =

Sri Lankan cricketer

Sujith Fernando^{[a]} (date of birth unknown) is a Sri Lankan former first-class cricketer, active 1998–99, who played for Panadura Sports Club. A left-handed batsman and a right-arm medium-pace bowler, he made a single first-class appearance for Panadura against Colombo scoring 8 runs in the first innings one in the second.
