= Ferdinando Piretti =

Italian mathematician

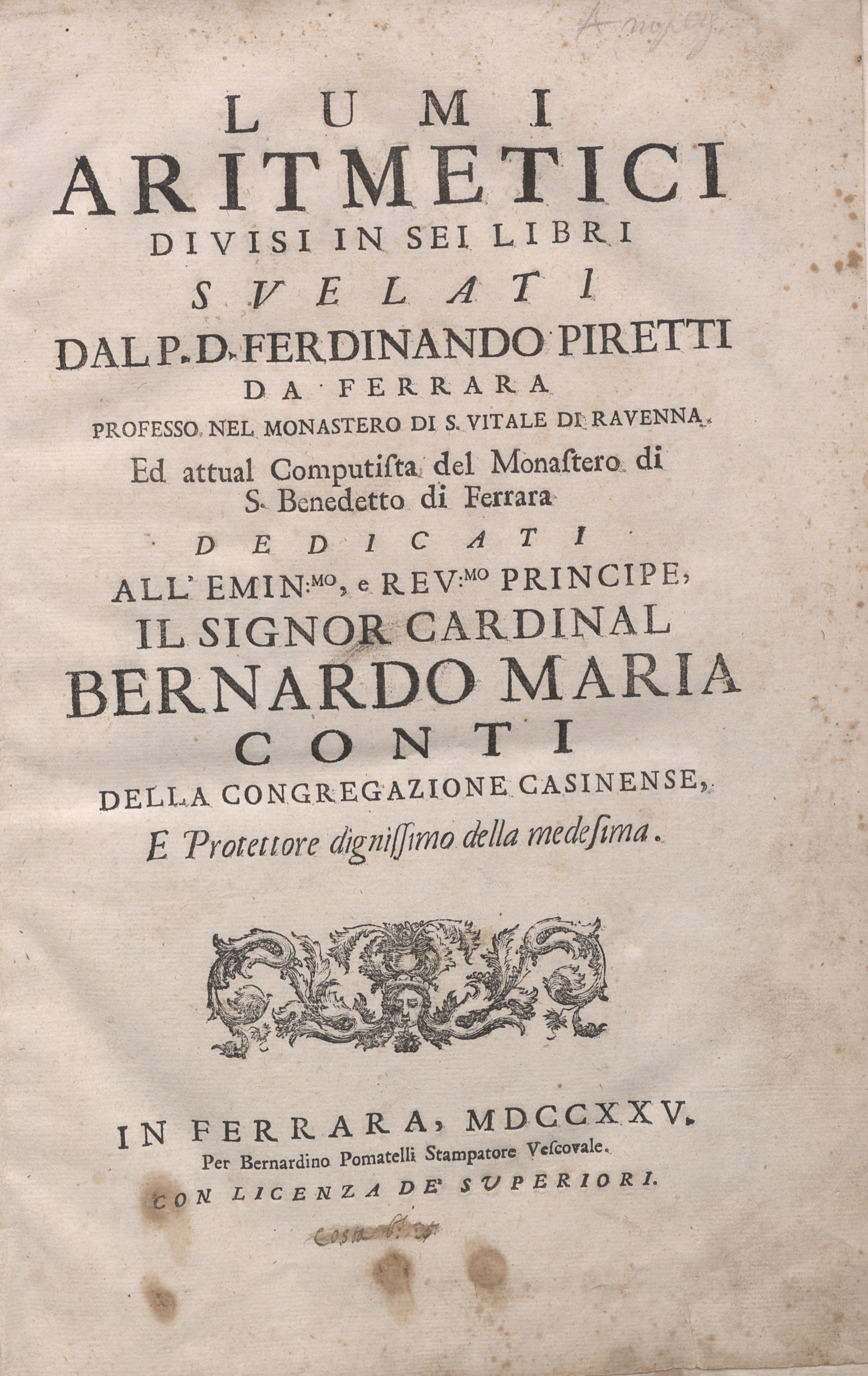
Lumi aritmetici, 1725

Ferdinando Piretti (17th century – 18th century) was an Italian mathematician. He lived at the San Vitale monastery in Ravenna and later at the San Benedetto monastery in Ferrara.

== Works ==
- Piretti, Ferdinando (1725). Lumi aritmetici. Ferrara: Bernardino Pomatelli.
