= Jeannot Fernand =

Malagasy politician

Jeannot Fernand (born November 22, 1961, in Ambato-Boeni) is a Malagasy politician. He is a member of the Senate of Madagascar for Betsiboka, and is a member of the Tiako i Madagasikara party.
