= Fernando Pérez =

Fernando Pérez may refer to:

- Fernando Pérez de Traba (c. 1090–c. 1155), medieval statesman
- Fernán Pérez de Guzmán (1376–1458), Spanish historian and poet
- Fernando Pérez de Almazán, Spanish emissary and Governor of Texas, 1722–1727
- Fernando Perez (baseball) (born 1983), American baseball outfielder and coach
- Fernando Pérez (director) (born 1944), Cuban film director
- Fernando Pérez (footballer) (born 1980), Argentine footballer
- Fernando Pérez (software developer), Creator of the IPython and Jupyter projects
- Fernando Pérez Pascal (born 1964), Mexican tennis player
- Fernando Pérez Royo (born 1943), Spanish academic and politician

== See also ==
- Fernando Peres (1943–2019), Portuguese footballer and manager
