= Ferdinand (surname) =

Ferdinand is a surname. Notable people with the surname include:

- Anton Ferdinand (born 1985), English footballer
- Kane Ferdinand (born 1992), Irish footballer
- Les Ferdinand (born 1966), English footballer and coach
- Rio Ferdinand (born 1978), English footballer and pundit
- Rita Ferdinand (born 1995), Nigerian para powerlifter
