= Ferdinando Palasciano =

Italian physician and politician (1815–1891)

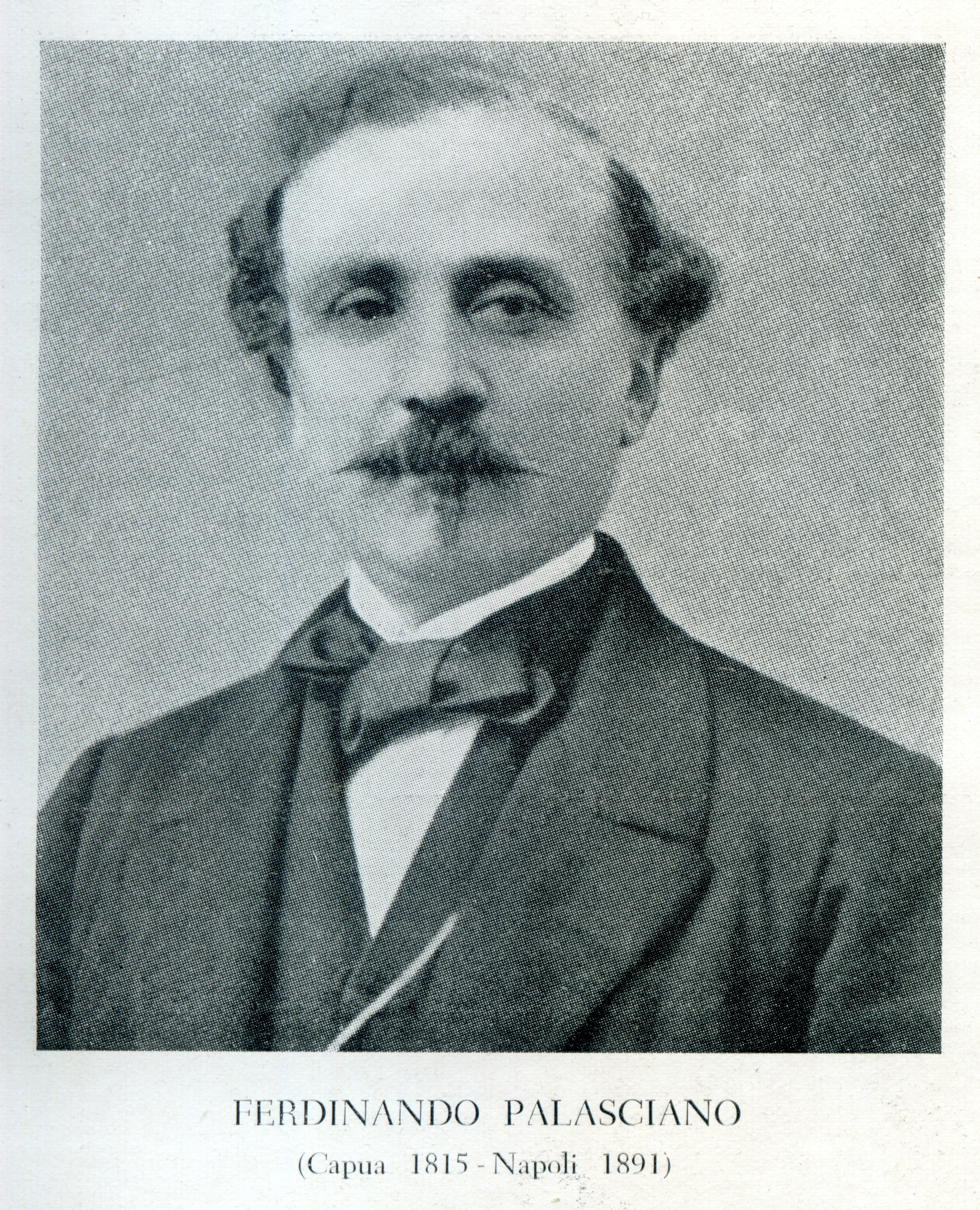
- Born: 13 June 1815; Capua, Kingdom of Naples
- Died: 28 November 1891 (aged 76); Naples, Kingdom of Italy
- Occupations: Physician, politician
- Known for: Forerunner of the Red Cross

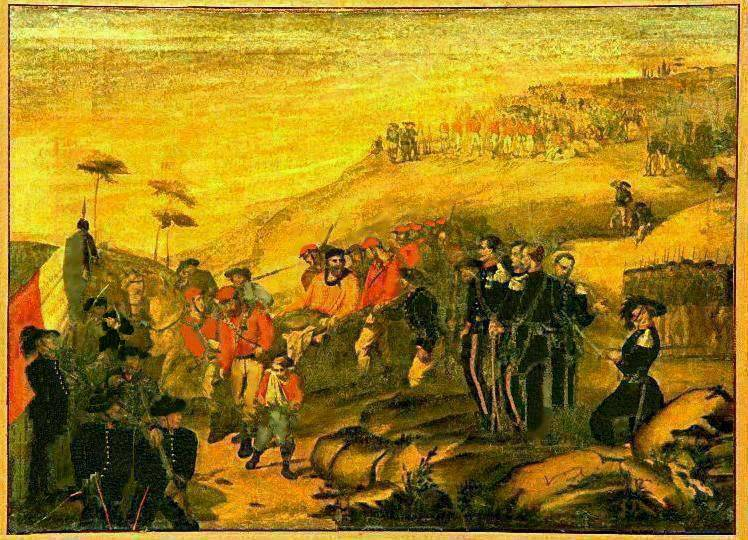
Ferdinando Palasciano helped Giuseppe Garibaldi to cure a wound suffered in the Battle of Aspromonte

Ferdinando Palasciano (June 13, 1815 – November 28, 1891) was an Italian physician and politician, considered one of the forerunners of the foundation of the Red Cross.

== Biography ==
Born in Capua (Campania, then part of the Kingdom of Naples), he graduated early in Literature and Philosophy, Veterinary Science and, finally, in Medicine and Surgery.

In 1848 he fought in the Bourbon army against the Risorgimento riots of 1848. However, his help to wounded went against the Royal orders, and he risked to be executed for insubordination. He declared:

The wounded, whatever army they belong to, are sacred to me and cannot be considered as enemies.

This declaration is believed to be one of the first related to the main "help principles" of the Red Cross.

Thanks to the intervention of King Ferdinand II, the sentence was commuted to one year in prison jail in Reggio Calabria.

In 1865 he was appointed as Professor of Surgical Chemistry at the University of Naples and in 1883 he was among the founders of the Italian Surgical Society.

During the Expedition of Thousand, Palasciano fought at the "Battle of Volturnus", taking care of wounded Borbonic soldiers.

Two years after, he worked on the other side of the trenches, since he was called by Giuseppe Garibaldi to cure a malleolus wound that he received while fighting on the Aspromonte mountains. The two made friends and started an epistolary correspondence now housed in the museum of San Martino, Naples.

He was also a member of the Italian Chamber of Deputies and Senate, and counsellor at the comune of Naples.

Around 1886 Palasciano developed dementia. He died in 1891 and was buried in the square of illustrious figure in Poggioreale Cemetery, Naples.

== See also ==
- Red Cross
- Giuseppe Garibaldi
