= Ferrante Bacciocchi =

Italian painter

Fra Ferrante Bacciocchi (17th century) was an Italian painter active in Ferrara. He had joined as a monk of the order of Phillip Neri. He painted a Stoning of St. Stephen for the church of San Stefano in that city; and for Santa Maria del Suffragio he painted a Holy Family.
