= Fernando Aceves Humana =

Mexican painter

- Occupation: Painter

Fernando Aceves Humana is a Mexican painter with works in collections at the Irish Museum of Modern Art, the Museum of Contemporary Art in Panama and the Kunstmuseum Bern.
