= Antoine-François-Claude Ferrand =

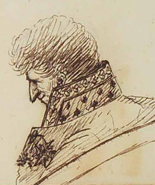

Antoine François Claude, comte Ferrand (French pronunciation: [ɑ̃twan fʁɑ̃swa klod kɔ̃t fɛʁɑ̃]; 4 July 1751 – 17 January 1825), French statesman and political writer, was born in Paris, and became a member of the parlement of Paris at eighteen.

== Life and career ==
Ferrand left France with the first party of emigrants, and attached himself to the Prince of Condé; late he was a member of the council of regency formed by the comte de Provence after the death of Louis XVI. He lived at Regensburg until 1801, when he returned to France, though he still sought to serve the royalist cause.

In 1814 Ferrand was made minister of state and postmaster-general. Ferrand countersigned the act of sequestration of Napoleon's property, and introduced a bill for the restoration of the property of the emigrants establishing a distinction, since become famous, between royalist of la ligne droite and those of la ligne courbe. At the second Bourbon restoration Ferrand was again for a short time postmaster general. He was also made a peer of France, member of the privy council, grand-officer and secretary of the orders of Saint Michel and the Saint Esprit, and in 1816 member of the Académie française. He continued his active support of ultra-royalist views until his death, which took place in Paris on 17 January 1825.

Besides a large number of political pamphlets, Ferrand was the author of:

- Éloge funèbre de Mme Élisabeth, sœur de Louis XVI
- L'Esprit de l'histoire, ou Lettres d'un père a son fils sur la manére d'étudier l'histoire (4 vols., 1802), which reached several editions, the last number in 1826 having prefixed to it a biographical sketch of the author by his nephew Héricart de Thury
- Éloge historique de Madame Élisabeth de France (1814)
- Œuvres dramatiques (1817)
- Théorie des révolutions rapprochée des principaux événènements qui en ont été l'origine, le développement ou la suite (4 vols., 1817)
- Histoire des trois démembrements de la Pologne, pour faire suite l'Histoire de l'anarchie de Pologne par Russie (3 vols., 1820).
