= Fernando Valades =

Mexican composer, pianist and singer

Fernando Teodoro Valadés Lejarza, (Mazatlán, Sinaloa, April 1, 1920 - Mexico City, December 14, 1978) was a Mexican composer, pianist and singer, best known as Fernando Valades.

At 18 years old he wrote "Te diré adiós" ("Say Goodbye"), a song that was successful and encouraged him to continue producing. When he performed, he sang and played the piano, sometimes accompanied by trios. He recorded over 100 compositions and toured performances in Mexico, Central and South America, the Caribbean and the United States.

Some of his songs have been recorded by artists such as Trío Los Astros, Angela Carrasco, Virginia López, Elisa Pérez Meza, Trío Los Zafiros, Lucía Méndez, among others.

Among his most famous compositions, including:

- Asómate a mi alma "(Look into my soul)"
- El diccionario "(The dictionary)"
- Porque no he de llorar "(Why shouldn´t I cry)"
- Ansias de amor "(Yearning for love)"
- Bogotana querida "(Dear Bogotana)"
- Coatepeque
- Costa Rica
- Regalo del cielo "(Gift from heaven)"
- Aunque tengas que llorar "(Even if you have to mourn)"
- Cántale mar "(Sea sing)"
- Mala muy mala "(Bad very bad)"
- Culparé al destino "(I'll blame destiny)"
- Estamos en paz "(We are at peace)"
- Mi última carta "(My last letter)"
- Lo de más es lo de menos "(Everything else doesn't matter)"
- Si yo vuelvo a San Antonio, "(If I go back to San Antonio)"
