= Fernando Andacht =

Uruguayan-born semiotician

Fernando Torres Andacht is a Uruguayan-born semanticist.

== Career ==
Andacht studied linguistics at the University of the Republic in Montevideo, graduating in 1978. Afterwards, he obtained an MA in General Linguistics at Ohio University (1981), a Doctorate in Latin American Studies at the University of Bergen, Norway (1998) and a PhD in Communication and Information at Universidade Federal do Rio Grande do Sul, Porto Alegre (2001). Currently, he is a Member of the Faculty of Graduate and Postdoctoral Studies at the University of Ottawa.

== Notable works ==
- El reality show: una perspectiva analítica. Buenos Aires: Grupo Editorial Norma. 2003. p. 139.
- Entre signos de asombro: antimanual para iniciarse en la semiótica. Montevideo: Ediciones Trilce. 1993. p. 200.
- En la cocina del sentido: Análisis semiótico de la comunicación política en las internas uruguayas 2014. Montevideo: Editorial Fin de siglo. 2014. p. 166.
- A Semiotic Reflection on Selfinterpretation and Identity
- A Semiotic Framework for the Social Imaginary
- On the Relevance of the Imagination in the Semiotic of C. S. Peirce
