= Hernández =

Hernandez
- Pronunciation: Spanish: [eɾˈnandeθ]
- Language: Spanish

Origin
- Meaning: Son of Hernando or Hernán
- Region of origin: Spain, Latin America

Other names
- Variant forms: Fernández, Hernandes, Fernandes

Hernández is a widespread Spanish patronymic surname that became common around the 15th century. It means son of Hernán, Hernando, or Fernando, the Spanish version of the Germanic Ferdinand. Fernández is also a common variant of the name. Hernandes and Fernandes are their Portuguese equivalents.

== Geographical distribution ==
As of 2014, 52.9% of all known bearers of the surname Hernández were residents of Mexico (frequency 1:25), 7.7% of the United States (1:510), 6.3% of Colombia (1:83), 5.8% of Venezuela (1:57), 4.1% of Cuba (1:30), 4.0% of Spain (1:125), 4.0% of Guatemala (1:44), 2.9% of Honduras (1:33), 2.7% of El Salvador (1:26), 1.5% of Nicaragua (1:43), 1.5% of the Philippines (1:746), 1.2% of the Dominican Republic (1:92) and 1.2% of Chile (1:158).

In Spain, the frequency of the surname was higher than national average (1:125) in the following autonomous communities:

1. Canary Islands (1:24)
2. Region of Murcia (1:66)
3. Castile and León (1:67)
4. Extremadura (1:100)

In Mexico, the frequency of the surname was higher than national average (1:25) in the following states:

1. Hidalgo (1:10)
2. San Luis Potosí (1:15)
3. Tabasco (1:16)
4. Veracruz (1:16)
5. Chiapas (1:16)
6. Tlaxcala (1:17)
7. Querétaro (1:22)
8. Oaxaca (1:22)
9. Tamaulipas (1:23)
10. Puebla (1:23)
11. State of Mexico (1:25)

== People with the name Hernández ==
=== Actors and television personalities ===
- Antonio Hernández (born 1953), Spanish film director and screenwriter
- April Lee Hernández (born 1980), Puerto Rican actress
- Daniel Hernández (born 1996), American rapper
- David Hernandez (born 1983), Mexican-American finalist on American Idol
- Gérard Hernandez (born 1933), French actor
- Jay Hernandez (born 1978), Mexican-American actor
- Juano Hernández (1896–1970), Puerto Rican actor
- Lilimar Hernandez (born 2000), American actress
- Óscar Isaac Hernández Estrada (born 1979), Guatemalan-born American actor (known as Oscar Isaac)
- Osmary Hernández, Venezuelan journalist
- Rafael Hernández (1928–1997), Spanish actor
- Tom Hernández (1915–1984), Spanish American actor
- Thom Adcox-Hernandez (born 1960), American actor
- Vicky Hernández (born 1945), Colombian actress

=== Artists ===
- Agustín Hernández Navarro (1924–2022), Mexican architect and sculptor
- Amalia Hernández (1917–2000), Mexican ballet choreographer
- Anaida Hernández (born 1954), Puerto Rican sculptor, painter, installation artist, muralist, documentary director, and businesswoman
- Daniel Hernández (1856–1932), Peruvian painter
- Desiderio Hernández Xochitiotzin (1922–2007), Mexican mural painter
- Felipe Hernandez (born 1971), Colombian architect
- Francisco Hernández Tomé (died 1872), Spanish mural painter
- Gilberto Hernández Ortega (1924–1978), Dominican painter
- Gregorio Hernández (usually "Fernández"), (1576–1636), Spanish sculptor
- José Hernández (1944–2013), Spanish painter
- Judithe Hernández (born 1948), American visual artist
- Lazaro Hernandez (born 1961), fashion designer
- Liz Hernández (born 1993), Mexican-born American visual artist and designer
- Nestor Hernandez (1961–2006), American photographer

=== Musicians and composers ===
- Ally Brooke Hernandez (born 1993), American singer, dancer, and member of the girl group Fifth Harmony
- Ariel Hernández (born 1972), American singer in pop group No Mercy
- Aurelio Hernández (born 1967), Cuban-born American musician, better known as "Aurelio Voltaire"
- Cenobio Hernandez, Mexican-American composer
- Daniel Hernandez (born 1996), American rapper of Puerto Rican and Mexican descent (known as 6ix9ine)
- Eduardo Hernández Moncada (1899–1995), Mexican composer, pianist, and conductor
- Gabriel Hernández, American singer in American pop band No Mercy
- Gisela Hernández (1912–1971), Cuban composer
- Horacio Hernandez (born 1963), Cuban drummer
- José Ledesma Hernández (born 1958), musician, composer, and educator
- Julio Alberto Hernández (1900–1999), Dominican composer
- Larry Hernández (born 1977), Mexican singer
- Marcos Hernandez (born 1982), American singer
- Myriam Hernández (born 1967), Chilean singer
- Oscar Hernández (born 1954), Puerto Rican salsa music composer
- Patrick Hernandez (born 1949), French singer
- Peter Hernández (born 1985), American singer of Puerto Rican-Filipino descent (known as Bruno Mars)
- Priscilla Hernández, Spanish singer-songwriter
- Rafael Hernández Marín (1892–1965), Puerto Rican composer
- Saúl Hernández (born 1964), Mexican singer and guitarist
- Sophy Hernández, Puerto Rican singer

=== Politicians ===
- Adriana Hernández Íñiguez (born 1978), Mexican politician
- Alfredo Hernández Raigosa (1963–2022), Mexican politician
- Alma Hernandez (born 1993), American politician
- Ana Hernandez (born 1978), American politician
- Barbara Hernandez (born 1992/93), American politician
- Benigno C. Hernández (1862–1954), American politician
- Benjamín Hernández Bustamante (born 1954), Mexican politician
- Benjamín Hernández Silva (born 1946), Mexican politician
- Benjamín Félix Hernández Ruiz, Mexican politician
- Bennelly Hernández Ruedas (born 1989), Mexican politician
- César Emiliano Hernández Ochoa, Mexican politician
- Consuelo Hernandez, American politician
- Daisy Hernández Gaytán (born 1983), Mexican politician
- Daniel Hernández Jr. (born 1990), American politician
- Dignora Hernández, Venezuelan politician
- Edward P. Hernandez (born 1957), American politician
- Elia Hernández Núñez (1962–2021), Mexican politician
- Elizabeth Hernandez (born 1961), American politician
- Elvia Hernández García (born 1962), Mexican politician
- Eugenio Hernández Flores (born 1959), Mexican politician
- David Hernández Pérez (born 1960), Mexican politician
- David Hernández Vallín (born 1967), Mexican politician
- Delio Hernández Valadés (born 1956), Mexican politician
- Eugenio Hernández Flores (born 1959), Mexican politician
- Federico Hernández Denton (born 1944), Chief Justice of the Supreme Court of Puerto Rico
- Francisco Hernández Juárez (born 1949), Mexican politician
- Gaudencio Hernández Burgos (born 1962), Mexican politician
- Gerardo Xavier Hernández (born 1968), Mexican politician
- Héctor Hernández Silva (born 1964), Mexican politician
- Héctor Hugo Hernández Rodríguez (born 1974), Mexican politician
- Héctor Javier Hernández (born 1958), Mexican politician
- Humberto Hernandez-Haddad (born 1951), Mexican politician
- Ismael Hernández (born 1964), Mexican politician, Governor of Durango
- Jaime Hernández González (born 1953), Mexican politician
- Javier Hernández Manzanares (born 1960), Mexican politician
- Jorge Hernández Hernández (born 1965), Mexican politician
- José María Hernández (1959–2015), Spanish politician
- Joseph Marion Hernández (1793–1857), American politician, first representative with Spanish ancestry to have served in the U.S. Congress
- Joshua Hernandez, American politician
- Juan Alonso Hernández Hernández (born 1960), Mexican politician
- Juan Orlando Hernández (born 1968), Honduran politician, former President of Honduras
- Julián Hernández Santillán (born 1963), Mexican politician
- Justino Hernández Hilaria (born 1955), Mexican politician
- Kenneth McClintock Hernández (born 1957), Puerto Rican politician
- Lisbeth Hernández Lecona (born 1974), Mexican politician
- Lorenzo Hernández Estrada (born 1959), Mexican politician
- Luis Hernández Cruz (born 1958), Mexican politician
- Lydia Hernandez, American politician
- Maximiliano Hernández Martínez (1882–1966), President of El Salvador
- Melody Hernandez, American politician
- Miguel Hernández Agosto (1927–2016), Puerto Rican senator
- Minerva Hernández Ramos (born 1969), Mexican politician
- Mirna Esmeralda Hernández (born 1961), Mexican politician
- Noé Hernández González (born 1965), Mexican politician
- Norma Hernandez (born 1990/91), American politician
- Oscar Hernandez, mayor of Bell, California
- Paula Hernández Olmos (born 1972), Mexican politician
- Rafael Hernández Colón (1936–2019), Governor of Puerto Rico
- Rafael Hernández Ochoa (1915–1990), Mexican politician
- Ramil Hernandez (born 1972), Filipino politician
- Ramiro Hernández García (born 1954), Mexican politician
- Rey Hernandez, American politician
- Roger Hernandez (born 1975), American politician, California Assembly member, 48th District
- Ruth Hernández Martínez (born 1962), Mexican politician
- Sabino Hernández Téllez (born 1940), Mexican politician
- Sergio Hernández Hernández (born 1962), Mexican politician
- Silvia Hernández Enríquez (born 1948), Mexican politician
- Tim Hernández (born 1997), American politician
- Tulio Hernández Gómez (1938–2023), Mexican politician

=== Sports ===
- Hernandez (wrestler) (born 1973), American wrestler
- Aaron Hernandez (1989–2017), American football player
- Abel Hernández (born 1990), Uruguayan football player
- Adriana Hernández (born 2003), Mexican rhythmic gymnast
- Aitor Hernández (born 1982), Spanish cyclist
- Alejandro Hernández (born 1977), Mexican tennis player
- Amelia Hernández (born 1971), Venezuelan chess player and surgeon
- Ana Hernández (born 1962), Cuban basketball player
- Anaysi Hernández (born 1981), Cuban judoka
- Anderson Hernández (born 1982), Dominican baseball player
- Andony Hernández (born 1981), Mexican football player
- Andris Hernández (born 1982), Venezuelan track and road cyclist
- Ángel Hernández (born 1998), Spanish long jumper
- Angel Hernandez (born 1961), Cuban-American baseball umpire
- Ariel Hernández (born 1972), Cuban boxer
- Bernardo Hernández (born 1942), Mexican footballer
- Carlos Hernández (born 1971), Salvadoran-American boxer
- Carlos Hernández (catcher) (born 1967), Venezuelan baseball catcher
- Carlos Hernández (infielder) (born 1975), Venezuelan baseball player
- Carlos Hernández (pitcher, born 1980), Venezuelan baseball pitcher
- Carlos Hernández (pitcher, born 1997), Venezuelan baseball pitcher
- Carlos Alexis Hernández (born 1972), Cuban weightlifter
- Carlos Hernández Valverde (born 1982), Costa Rican football player
- César Hernández (born 1990), Venezuelan professional baseball second baseman
- Dani Hernández (born 1985), Venezuelan footballer
- Daniel Hernández (born 1976), Mexican-American football player
- Darwinzon Hernández (born 1996), Venezuelan professional baseball pitcher
- David Hernandez (born 1985), American baseball player
- Daysbel Hernández (born 1996), Cuban baseball player
- Dewan Hernandez (born 1996), American basketball player
- Diory Hernández (born 1984), Dominican baseball player
- Édgar Hernández (born 1977), Mexican race walker
- Elier Hernández (born 1994), Dominican baseball player
- Elieser Hernández (born 1995), Venezuelan baseball player
- Emilio Hernández (born 1984), Chilean football player
- Enrique Hernández (born 1991), Puerto Rican baseball player
- Félix Hernández (born 1986), Venezuelan baseball player
- Francisco Hernández (born 1949), Costa Rican football player
- Fredy Hernández (born 1978), Colombian race walker
- Gabriel Hernández (1973–2001), Dominican boxer
- Giovanni Hernández (born 1976), Colombian football player
- Guadalupe Bautista Hernández (born 1988), Mexican professional boxer
- Hailey Hernandez (born 2003), American olympic diver
- Henry Hernández (born 1985), Salvadoran football player
- Heriberto Hernández (born 1999), Dominican baseball player
- Hugo Hernández (born 1985), Mexican professional boxer
- Humberto Hernández, Colombian road cyclist
- Israel Hernández, Cuban judo athlete
- Jairo Hernández (born 1972), Colombian cyclist
- James Chico Hernandez (born 1954), American wrestler
- Jason Hernandez (born 1983), Puerto Rican-American soccer player
- Javier Hernández (Chicharito, born 1988), Mexican football player
- Javier Hernández (born 1961), Mexican football player
- Joaquín Hernández (born 1971), Mexican football player
- Joe Hernandez (1940–2021), American football player
- Jonathan Hernández (baseball) (born 1996), Dominican-American baseball player
- Jonay Hernández (born 1979), Venezuelan football player
- José Hernández (born 1969), Puerto Rican baseball coach
- José Hernández (born 1997), Dominican baseball player
- José Alberto Hernández (born 1977), Mexican football player
- Jose María Gutiérrez Hernández (born 1976), Spanish football player (commonly known as Guti)
- Juan Camilo Hernández (born 1999), nicknamed "Cucho", Colombian football player
- Juan Martín Hernández (born 1982), Argentine rugby player
- Juan Hernández Ramírez (born 1965), Mexican football player
- Juan Hernández Sierra (born 1969), Cuban boxer
- Juan Bautista Hernández Pérez (born 1962), Cuban boxer
- Julio Robles Hernández (1951–2001), Spanish bullfighter
- Keith Hernandez (born 1953), American baseball player
- Kike Hernandez (born 1991), Puerto Rican baseball player
- Laurie Hernandez (born 2000), American gymnast
- Liván Hernández (born 1975), Cuban baseball player
- Lucas Hernandez (born 1996), French professional footballer
- Luis Hernández, Mexican football player
- Luis Hernández (born 1955), Mexican long-distance runner
- Luis Hernández (born 1984), Mexican figure skater
- Luis Hernández (born 1984), Venezuelan baseball player
- Luis Daniel Hernández (born 1977), Peruvian footballer
- Luis Miguel Hernández (born 1985), Salvadoran footballer
- Luis Omar Hernández (born 1985), Mexican football player
- Manuel Hernández (born 1984), Spanish motorbike rider
- Manuel Hernandez (born 1948), Spanish-American football player
- Miguel Hernández (born 1970), Mexican soccer player
- María de la Paz Hernández (born 1977), Argentine field hockey player
- Marcos Hernández (born 1978), Cuban freestyle swimmer
- Matt Hernandez (born 1961), American football player
- Nicolás Hernández (born 1979), Argentine football player
- Noé Hernández (1978–2013), Mexican race walker
- Orlando Hernández (born 1965), Cuban baseball player
- Óscar Hernández (born 1978), Spanish tennis player
- Pablo Hernández Domínguez (born 1985), Spanish football player
- Patricio Hernández (born 1956), Argentine football player and coach
- Pedro Hernández (born 1989), Dominican baseball player
- Pedro Hernández (born 1955), Cuban fencer
- Pedro Hernández (born 1981), Mexican football player
- Pedro Hernández Martínez (born 1978), Spanish football player
- Pepu Hernández (born 1958), Spanish basketball coach
- Rafael Tobías Hernández Alvarado (born 1958), Venezuelan baseball player
- Ramón Hernández (born 1972), Puerto Rican beach volleyball player
- Ramon Hernández (born 1996), Venezuelan baseball player
- Regla Hernández (born 1968), Cuban basketball player
- Roberto Hernández (1967–2021), Cuban sprinter
- Roberto Hernández (born 1964), Puerto Rican baseball player
- Román Hernández Onna (1949–2021), Cuban chess grandmaster
- Ronaldo Hernández (born 1997), Colombian baseball player
- Rudy Hernández (1931–2022), Dominican baseball player
- Rudy Hernández (born 1951), Mexican baseball player
- Runelvys Hernández (born 1978), Dominican baseball player
- Sebastián Hernández (born 1986), Colombian football player
- Sergio Hernández (born 1983), Spanish race car driver
- Sergio Hernández (born 1963), Argentine basketball coach
- Teoscar Hernández (born 1992), Dominican baseball player
- Théo Hernandez (born 1997), French footballer
- Toby Hernández (born 1958), Venezuelan baseball player
- Tomás Hernández (1930–1982), Spanish footballer
- Víctor Hugo Hernández (born 1986), Mexican football player
- Will Hernandez (born 1995), American football player
- Willie Hernández (1954–2023), Puerto Rican baseball player
- Willie Hernandez (tennis), Filipino tennis player
- Xavi Hernández (born 1980), Spanish football player
- Yadiel Hernández (born 1987), Cuban baseball player
- Yampier Hernández (born 1984), Cuban boxer
- Yermi Hernández (born 1980), Honduran football player
- Yoan Pablo Hernández (born 1980), Cuban boxer
- Yoandry Hernández (born 1980), Cuban weightlifter
- Yonny Hernández (born 1998), Venezuelan baseball player

=== Writers ===
- Alonso Hernández del Portillo (1543–1624), Spanish chronicler
- Amado V. Hernandez (1903–1970), Filipino writer and labor leader
- Anabel Hernández (born 1972), Mexican journalist
- Carol Hernandez, American journalist
- Consuelo Hernández (born 1952), Colombian/American poet and literary critic
- Ernesto Hernández Busto (born 1968), Cuban writer
- Felisberto Hernández (1902–1964), Uruguayan writer
- Gilbert Hernandez (born 1957), American cartoonist (part of Los Bros Hernandez)
- Iliana Hernández (born 1973), Cuban journalist
- Jaime Hernandez (born 1959), American cartoonist (part of Los Bros Hernandez)
- Javier Hernandez (born 1966), American comic book writer
- José Hernández (1834–1886), Argentine poet, journalist, and politician
- Macarena Hernandez, American journalist and academic
- Mario Hernandez (born 1953), American writer and cartoonist (part of Los Bros Hernandez)
- Miguel Hernández (1910–1942), Spanish poet and playwright
- Natalio Hernández (born 1947), Mexican Nahua poet
- Normando Hernández González (born 1969), Cuban writer and journalist
- Raúl Hernández Garrido (born 1964), Spanish playwright
- Tim Z. Hernandez (born 1974), American writer and poet
- Victor Hernández Cruz (born 1948), Puerto Rican poet
- Von Hernandez, Filipino literature professor and environmentalist

=== Other ===
- Celeste Rivas Hernandez (2010–2025), American girl found dead in D4vd's car
- Claudia Hernández, Peruvian beauty queen and model
- Dena G. Hernandez, neurogeneticist
- Diego E. Hernández (1934–2017), United States admiral
- Dolores Jiménez Hernández (born 1955), Mexican diplomat
- Edward Niño Hernández (born 1986), Colombian man, formerly the world's shortest living man
- Esequiel Hernández Jr, Mexican-American high school student accidentally killed by U.S. military
- Francisco Hernández de Córdoba (died 1517), Spanish conquistador, explorer of Yucatán
- Francisco Hernández de Córdoba (1475?–1526), Spanish conquistador, founder of Nicaragua
- Francisco Hernández de Toledo (1514–1587), Spanish naturalist and physician
- Gilberto Hernández Guerrero (born 1970), Mexican chess player
- Guillermo Hernández-Cartaya (born 1932), Cuban-American banker and tax evader
- Hernandez brothers, American graphic artists
- Hil Hernández (born 1984), Chilean beauty queen
- Humberto Hernandez Jr. (born 1962), Cuban-American attorney and government official
- Israel Hernandez, American government official
- Isaac Hernández (born 1990), Mexican ballet dancer
- José Gregorio Hernández (1864–1919), Venezuelan physician
- José M. Hernández (born 1962), American engineer and former astronaut
- Juan Hernández Saravia (1880–1962), Republican officer during the Spanish Civil War
- María Julia Hernández (1939–2007), Salvadoran human rights activist
- Nivia Fernández Hernández (born 1955), Puerto Rican dietician and academic administrator
- Nouria Hernandez (born 1957), Swiss biologist and rector of the University of Lausanne
- Pedro Hernández de Córdova, Spanish soldier
- Rafael Pérez Hernández (1905–1972), Mexican criminal
- Rosario Hernández Diéguez (1916–1936), Spanish Galician newspaper hawker and trade unionist
- Scarlin Hernandez (born 1991), Dominican-American astronautical engineer
- Socorro Hernandez-Bernasconi (born 1941), Mexican-American teacher and activist
- Valerie Hernandez (born 1993), Puerto Rican beauty pageant winner Miss International 2014

== Places ==
- Garcia Hernandez, town in Bohol province of the Philippines
- Hernandez Houses, New York
- Hernandez, New Mexico
- Hernandez Reservoir, California
- Hernández–Capron Trail, Florida
- Maria Hernandez Park, New York
- Rafael Hernández Airport, Puerto Rico
- Gaspar Hernández, Dominican Republic

== Legal cases ==
- Hernandez v. Texas (1954 in the Supreme Court of the United States, on civil rights for Mexican Americans)
- People v. Hernandez (1956 in the Supreme Court of the Philippines, on the crime of rebellion)
- United States v. Montoya De Hernandez (1985 in the Supreme Court of the United States, on detention and border searches relating to drug smuggling)
- Hernandez v. Commissioner (1989 in the Supreme Court of the United States, on whether fees for training programs operated by charities can be deducted as charitable contributions)
- Hernandez v. New York (1991 in the Supreme Court of the United States, on the removal of jurors from cases on the basis of their ability to understand Spanish testimony)
- Hernandez v. Robles (2006 in the New York Court of Appeals, on whether the prohibition of same-sex marriage is a violation of civil rights)
- Hernandez v. Mesa (2017 in the U.S. Supreme Court, argued again in 2019, on civil liability for a border patrol agent acting in a border zone)

== Other ==
- 19079 Hernández, a main belt asteroid
- Hernández-Camacho's night monkey, South American primate

== See also ==
- Elizabeth Hernandez (disambiguation)
- Fernandes
- Fernández
- Hernandes
