= Fernandes =

Fernandes/ Fernández
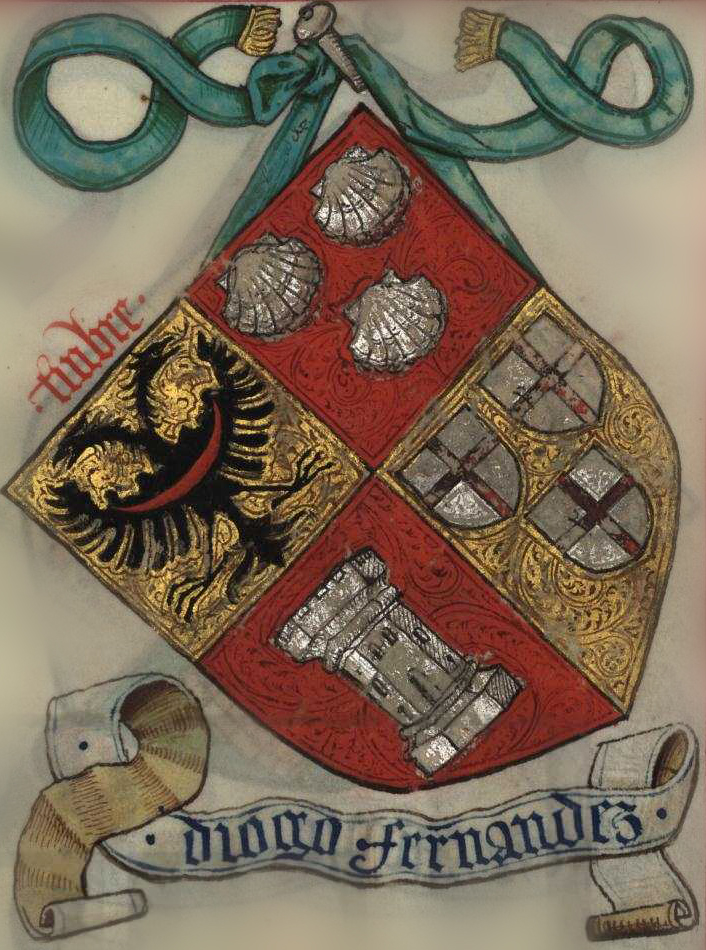
- Coat of arms designed by the king of arms João de Cró for Diogo Fernandes.
- Pronunciation: Portuguese: Portugal: /fɨɾ.ˈnɐ̃.dɨʃ/; Brazil: /feɾ.ˈnɐ̃.dʒis/, /feʁ.ˈnɐ̃.dʒiʃ/, /feh.ˈnɐ̃ds/; Galician: /feɾ.ˈnɐn.ðes; Spanish: /feɾ.ˈnɐn.des

Origin
- Origin: From Gothic, "Frithunanths".
- Meaning: "Son of Fernando"
- Region of origin: Portugal / Espanha

Other names
- Variant forms: Fernández, Fernandici, Fredenandiz, Ferdinandsson, Hernández, Hernandes

Fernandes is a patronymic surname in the Portuguese- and Spanish-speaking countries. The name is a patronymic form of the Portuguese and Spanish personal name Fernando. Fernandes is the 243rd most common surname in the world, the 3rd one in Angola and in São Tomé and Príncipe, the 10th one in Portugal, and the 18th one in Brazil. The Spanish version of this surname is Fernández.

People with the surname Fernandes include:

== Academics ==
- Florestan Fernandes (1920–1995), Brazilian sociologist and politician
- Jane Fernandes (born 1956), president-designate of Gallaudet University
- Norma Fernandes (died 2024), Pakistani Catholic teacher, honored with Tamgha-i-Imtiaz
- Rosette Batarda Fernandes (1916–2005), Portuguese botanist

== Arts, media, and entertainment ==
- Ana Rocha Fernandes, Cape Verdian film director, editor and screenwriter
- Carla Fernandes (born 2003), Polish singer and songwriter
- Collien Ulmen-Fernandes (born 1981), German television presenter and actress
- Cyprian Fernandes (born 1943), Goan Kenyan and Australian journalist and writer
- Danny Fernandes (born 1985), Canadian singer-songwriter
- Erica Fernandes (born 1993), Indian TV actress and model
- Manuel Gardner-Fernandes, German guitarist virtuoso and singer from the band Unprocessed
- Nomi Fernandes (born 1985), Swiss glamour model
- Paula Fernandes (born 1984), Brazilian singer
- Shawn Desman (born 1982), Canadian singer
- Remo Fernandes (born 1953), Indian musician
- Vânia Fernandes (born 1985), Portuguese singer
- Vivian Wilson da Silva Fernandes (born 1990), rapper from Mumbai, India, also known as DIVINE

== Business ==
- Benjamin Fernandes (born 1992), Tanzanian entrepreneur
- Tony Fernandes (born 1964), Malaysian entrepreneur

== Explorers ==
- Álvaro Fernandes (15th century), Portuguese explorer and navigator
- Baltasar Fernandes (c. 1580–c. 1667), Portuguese explorer of Brazil
- Duarte Fernandes (16th century), Portuguese explorer and diplomat
- João Fernandes Lavrador (1453–1501), Portuguese explorer
- Pedro Fernandes de Queirós (1563–1614), Portuguese explorer

== Politics ==
- Emanuel Jardim Fernandes (born 1944), Portuguese politician
- Ernesto Fernandes (1945–2025), Timorese politician
- George Fernandes (1930–2019), Indian politician, Minister of Defence
- Joaquim Teófilo Fernandes Braga (1843–1924), Portuguese politician, writer and playwright
- Maria Domingas Fernandes Alves (born 1959), East Timorese politician
- Oscar Fernandes (1941–2021), Indian politician
- Suella Fernandes (born 1980), British Conservative Party politician, MP for Fareham from 2015

== Religion ==
- Angelo Innocent Fernandes (1913–2000), Goan Catholic cleric, Archbishop of Delhi from 16 September 1967 - 27 January 1991
- Anthony Fernandes (1936–2023), Indian Roman Catholic bishop
- Earl Kenneth Fernandes (born 1972), first Indian American Latin Rite Catholic bishop

== Sports ==
- Fernandes (footballer, born 1926), Joaquim Fernandes da Silva (1926–2009), Portuguese defender
- Fernandes (footballer, born 1978), Rodrigo Fernandes Valete, Brazilian midfielder
- Fernandes (footballer, born 1985), Micerlanio Fernandes da Silva, Brazilian midfielder
- Fernandes (footballer, born 1994), Bruno Miguel Borges Fernandes, Portuguese midfielder
- Fernandes (footballer, born 1995), Jonathan da Silveira Fernandes Reis, Brazilian midfielder
- Fernandes (footballer, born 1997), Rafaelson Bezerra Fernandes, Vietnamese-Brazilian Striker
- Aaron Fernandes (born 1956), Canadian field hockey player
- Alfred Fernandes (born 1966), Indian football coach
- Ariosvaldo Fernandes (born 1976), Brazilian para-athlete
- Ashley Fernandes (born 1987), Indian footballer
- Bibiano Fernandes (born 1980), Brazilian martial artist
- Bibiano Fernandes (footballer) (born 1976), Indian football manager and former player
- Brandon Fernandes (born 1994), Indian footballer
- Cajetan Fernandes (born 1989), Indian footballer
- Charles Fernandes (1857–1944), English footballer
- Cláudio Roberto Siqueira Fernandes (born 1980), Brazilian footballer
- Clyde Fernandes (born 1993), Indian footballer
- Dawson Fernandes (born 1990), Indian footballer
- Fabrice Fernandes (born 1979), French footballer
- Flávia Fernandes (born 1981), Brazilian water polo player
- Francis Fernandes (born 1985), Indian footballer
- Carla Fernandes (born 1973), Angolan swimmer
- Francisco de Jesus Fernandes (1946–2010), Brazilian footballer
- Gabriel Fernandes (born 1988), Indian footballer
- Gedson Fernandes (born 1999), Portuguese footballer
- Gelson Fernandes (born 1986), Swiss footballer
- Kingsley Fernandes (born 1998), Indian footballer
- James Fernandes (born 1994), Indian footballer
- Jean-Claude Fernandes (born 1972), French football manager and former player
- Jean Carlo Bernieri Fernandes (born 1993), Brazilian footballer
- Júlio Fernandes (born 1996), Brazilian footballer
- Junior Fernandes (born 1988), Brazilian-Chilean footballer
- Micky Fernandes (born 1983), Indian footballer
- Myron Fernandes (born 1993), Indian footballer
- Nicholas Fernandes (born 1992), Indian footballer
- Nicolette Fernandes (born 1983), Guyanese squash player
- Raynier Fernandes (born 1996), Indian footballer
- Romeo Fernandes (born 1992), Indian footballer
- Ron Fernandes (1951–2023), American football player
- Selwyn Fernandes (born 1980), Indian footballer
- Seriton Fernandes (born 1992), Indian footballer
- Vanderlei Fernandes Silva (born 1975), Brazilian footballer
- Vanessa Fernandes (born 1985), Portuguese triathlete
- Victorino Fernandes (born 1989), Indian footballer

== Miscellaneous ==
- Alex Fernandes, multiple people
- António Fernandes, multiple people
- Bruno Fernandes, multiple people
- Emanuel Fernandes, multiple people
- John Fernandes, multiple people
- Manuel Fernandes, multiple people
- Maria Fernandes, multiple people
- Mario Fernandes, multiple people
- Vasco Fernandes, multiple people

== See also ==
- Fernández
- Fernandes Guitars
- Hernandes
- Hernández
