= Antonio Fernández =

Antonio Fernández may refer to:

- Antonio M. Fernández (1902–1956), United States Representative from New Mexico
- Antonio Fernández (archer) (born 1991), Spanish sport archer
- Antonio Fernández (athlete) (born 1948), Spanish athlete, middle-distance runner
- Antonio Deinde Fernandez (1929–2015), Nigerian businessman and diplomat
- Antonio Fernández Arias (died 1684), Spanish painter
- Antonio Fernández Bordas (1870–1950), Spanish violinist and musical teacher
- Antonio Fernández Díaz (1932–2025), known as Fosforito, Spanish flamenco singer
- Antonio Fernández Santillana (1876–1909), early pioneer in aviation
- Antonio Fernandez (Gang), former head of Latin Kings
- Antonio Fernández (footballer, born 1942) (1942–2022), Spanish football player and manager
- Antonio Fernández (footballer, born 1978), Spanish football player and manager
- Antonio Fernández (football manager) (born 1970), Spanish football manager
- Antonio César Fernández (1946–2019), Spanish missionary

== See also ==
- António Fernandes (disambiguation)
