= Anaida (given name) =

Anaida is an Indian performer.

Anaida is also a feminine given name which may refer to:

- Anaida Hernández (born 1954), Puerto Rican artist
- Anaida Poilievre, Venezuelan-born Canadian political staffer
- Anaida Sumbatyan (1905–1985), Armenian pianist

== See also ==
- Anahita
