= Maria Fernandes =

Maria Fernandes may refer to:

- Maria Fernandes (Portuguese athlete) (born 1969), Portuguese Paralympic athlete
- Maria Fernandes (Brazilian athlete) (born 1960), Brazilian athlete in shot put
- Maria Helena Rosas Fernandes (born 1933), Brazilian composer
- Maria Celestina Fernandes (born 1945), Angolan children's author
- Maria Helena de Senna Fernandes, Macanese civil servant

== See also ==
- María Fernández (disambiguation)
