= No Matter What They Say (disambiguation) =

No Matter What They Say is a song by Lil' Kim

No Matter What They Say may also refer to:

- "No Matter What They Say", song by Denise LaSalle 1978
- "No Matter What They Say", song by Priscilla Hernández
- "No Matter What They Say", song by Heinz (singer) Meek, Lawrence 1964
- "No Matter What They Say", song by Booker T. & the MG's, sampled in "Shamrocks and Shenanigans" on House of Pain (album)
- "No Matter What They Say", song by Raptile
