= Rosamaria =

Rosamaria is a given name. Notable people with the name include:

- Rosamaria Montibeller (born 1994), Brazilian volleyball player
- Rosamaria Murtinho (born 1935), Brazilian actress
- Rosamaría Roffiel (born 1945), Mexican poet, novelist, journalist and editor
