= Dolores Jiménez =

Dolores Jiménez may refer to:

- Dolores Jiménez Hernández (born 1955), Mexican diplomat
- Dolores Jiménez y Muro (1848–1925), Mexican schoolteacher and revolutionary
