= Elizabeth Hernandez =

Elizabeth Hernandez or Hernández may refer to:

- Elizabeth Hernández (model), Puerto Rican television personality, author, model, and motivational speaker
- Elizabeth Hernandez (politician) (born 1961), American politician, member of the Illinois House of Representatives
- Elizabeth Newell Hernandez (born 1982), American female road and track cyclist
- Liz Hernández (born 1993), Mexican-born American visual artist and designer
- Lizbeth Hernández, Mexican journalist, editor and photographer
