= 40th federal electoral district of the State of Mexico =

Federal electoral district of Mexico

State of Mexico's 40th
- Electoral district of the Chamber of Deputies of Mexico

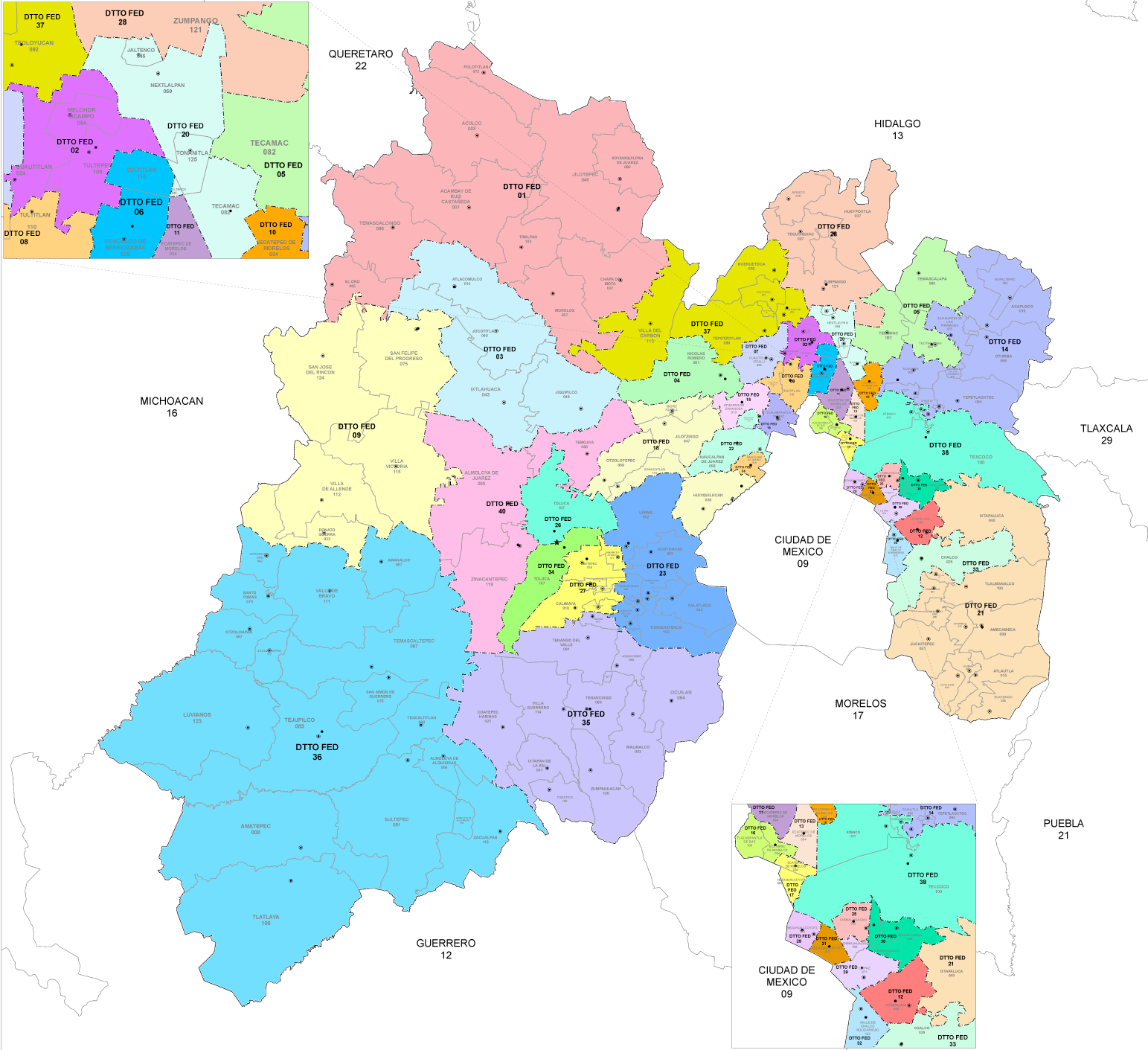
- State of Mexico's districts since 2023

Incumbent
- Member: Azucena Huerta Romero
- Party: ▌Ecologist Green Party
- Congress: 66th (2024–2027)

District
- State: State of Mexico
- Head town: San Miguel Zinacantepec
- Coordinates: 19°17′N 99°44′W
- Covers: Almoloya de Juárez, Otzolotepec, Temoaya, Zinacantepec
- PR region: Fifth
- Precincts: 133
- Population: 480,968 (2020 census)

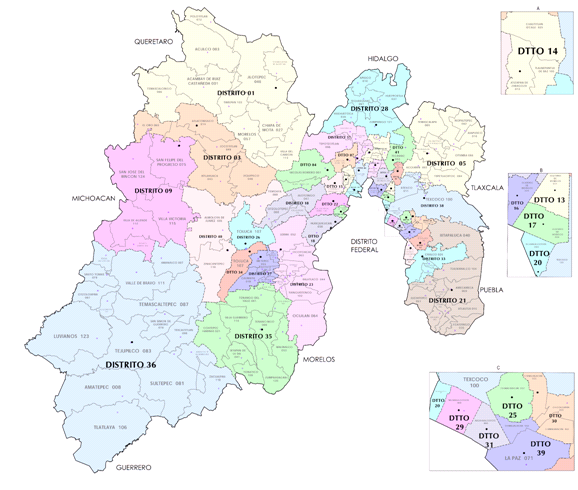
2017–2022 districting scheme

The 40th federal electoral district of the State of Mexico (Spanish: Distrito electoral federal 40 del Estado de México) is one of the 300 electoral districts into which Mexico is divided for elections to the federal Chamber of Deputies and one of 40 such districts in the State of Mexico.

It elects one deputy to the lower house of Congress for each three-year legislative session by means of the first-past-the-post system. Votes cast in the district also count towards the calculation of proportional representation ("plurinominal") deputies elected from the fifth region.

The 37th to 40th districts were created by the Federal Electoral Institute (IFE) in its 2005 redistricting process and were first contested in the 2006 general election.

The current member for the district, elected in the 2024 general election, is Azucena Huerta Romero of the Ecologist Green Party of Mexico (PVEM).

== District territory ==
Under the 2023 districting plan adopted by the National Electoral Institute (INE), which is to be used for the 2024, 2027 and 2030 federal elections, the 40th district is located to the north and west of Toluca and covers 133 electoral precincts (secciones electorales) across four of the state's 125 municipalities:

- Almoloya de Juárez, Otzolotepec, Temoaya and Zinacantepec.

The head town (cabecera distrital), where results from individual polling stations are gathered together and tallied, is the city of San Miguel Zinacantepec. In the 2020 census, the district reported a total population of 480,968.

== Previous districting schemes ==
Evolution of electoral district numbers
	1974	1978	1996	2005	2017	2023
State of Mexico	15	34	36	40	41	40
Chamber of Deputies	196	300				

Under the previous districting plans enacted by the INE and its predecessors, the 40th district was situated as follows:

2017–2022

The municipalities of Almoloya de Juárez, Temoaya and Zinacantepec. The head town was at San Miguel Zinacantepec.

2005–2017

The municipalities of Ixtapan de la Sal, Rayón, Tenango del Valle, Tonatico, Villa Guerrero, Zinacantepec and Zumpahuacán. The head town was at San Miguel Zinacantepec.

== Deputies returned to Congress ==
(Mexico) National parties
- Current
- PAN
- PRI
- PT
- PVEM
- MC
- Morena
- PAZ
- Somos
- Defunct or local only
- PLM
- PNR
- PRM
- PNM
- PP
- PPS
- PARM
- PFCRN
- CON
- PANAL
- PSD
- PES
- PES
- PRD

State of Mexico's 40th district
Election	Deputy	Party	Term	Legislature
2006	Juan Victoria Alva	National Action Party (Mexico)	2006–2009	60th Congress
2009	Ignacio Rubí Salazar	Institutional Revolutionary Party	2009–2012	61st Congress
2012	Gerardo Xavier Hernández Tapia	Institutional Revolutionary Party	2012–2015	62nd Congress
2015	Olga María Esquivel Hernández (Note: Esquivel Hernández took a temporary leave of absence from her seat between March and July 2018. She was replaced for the duration by her alternate, García Salgado.); Idania Itzel García Salgado	Institutional Revolutionary Party	2015–2018; 2018	63rd Congress
2018	Marco Antonio Reyes Colín	National Regeneration Movement	2018–2021	64th Congress
2021	Javier González Zepeda	National Action Party (Mexico)	2021–2024	65th Congress
2024	Azucena Huerta Romero	Ecologist Green Party of Mexico	2024–2027	66th Congress

== Presidential elections ==
State of Mexico's 40th district
Election	District won by	Party or coalition	%
2018	Andrés Manuel López Obrador	Juntos Haremos Historia	49.8557
2024	Claudia Sheinbaum Pardo	Sigamos Haciendo Historia	54.9301
