= Secretariat of Energy =

Coordinates: 19.387°N 99.174°W

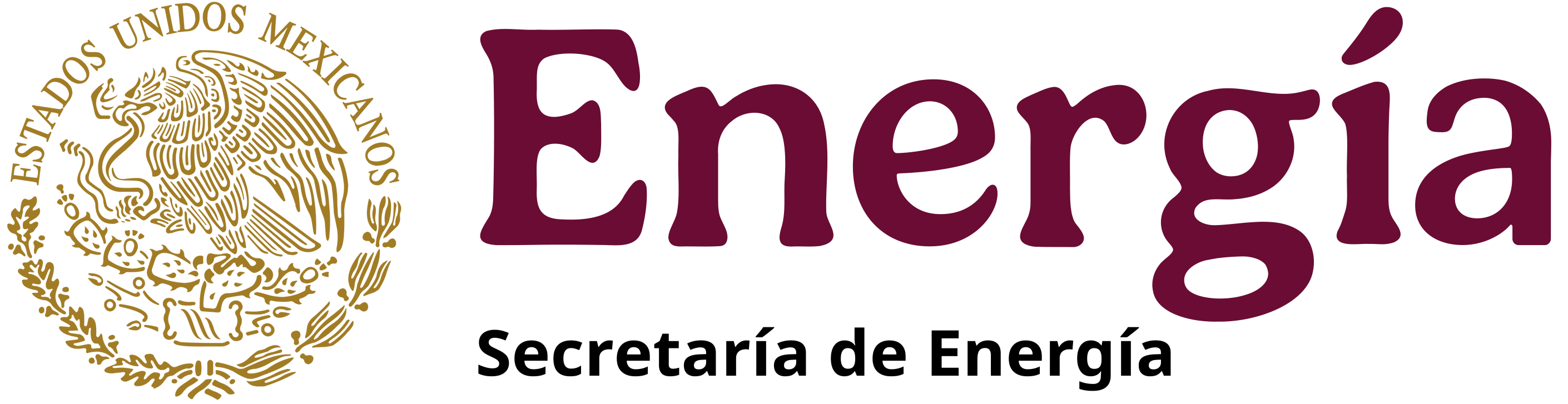

In Mexico, the Secretariat of Energy (Spanish: Secretaría de Energia) is the government department in charge of production and regulation of energy. This secretary is a member of the Executive Cabinet.

== History ==
On December 7, 1946, the Secretaría de Bienes Nacionales e Inspección Administrativa (Secretariat of National Assets and Administrative Inspection) was created with Alfonso Caso Andrade serving as secretary. In 1958, the name was changed to Secretaría de Patrimonio Nacional (Secretariat of National Assets, SEPANAL). In the late 1970s and 1980s it changed names two more times, being known as the Secretaría de Patrimonio y Fomento Industrial (Secretariat of Assets and Industrial Development) during the presidency of José López Portillo PRI and as the Secretaría de Energía, Minas e Industria Paraestatal (Secretariat of Energy, Mining and Semi-Public Industries) until obtaining its current name in 1994.

Three individuals served as Secretary of Energy under President Felipe Calderón PAN: Georgina Yamilet Kessel Martínez (December 2006 – January 2011), José Antonio Meade (January – September 2011), and Jordy Herrera Flores (September 2011 – November 2012).

== See also ==
- César Emiliano Hernández Ochoa
