= Hernandes =

Origin
- Meaning: "Son of Hernan"
- Region of origin: Portugal

Other names
- Variant forms: Fernandes, Fernández and Hernández (Spanish)

Hernandes is a Portuguese patronymic surname, a variant of the Spanish surname Hernández.

- Clodovil Hernandes (1937–2009), Brazilian fashion stylist, television presenter, and politician
- Daniel Hernandes (born 1979), Brazilian judoka
- Sônia Hernandes (born 1958), Brazilian pastor

== See also ==
- Fernandes
- Fernández
- Hernández
