= María Fernández =

Maria Fernandez may refer to:

- María Fernández (footballer) (María Fernández Almenar, born 1985), footballer
- María Lucía Fernández (born 1968), Colombian journalist and news presenter
- María Luisa Fernández (swimmer) (born 1969), Spanish swimmer
- María Luisa Fernández (writer) (1870–1938), Chilean writer
- María Paula Fernández (born 1998), Paraguayan handball player
- María Teresa Fernández de la Vega (born 1949), Spanish politician
- Isabel Fernández (judoka) (María Isabel Fernández; born 1972), Spanish judoka
- María Pilar Fernández (born 1962), Spanish sport shooter
- María Calderón Fernandez (born 1997), Spanish cyclist
- Pepa Fernández (born 1965), Spanish journalist
- María Ángeles Fernández Lebrato (born 1970), Spanish Paralympic cyclist and swimmer
- María Fernández Ostolaza (born 1967), Spanish rhythmic gymnast and coach
- María Fernández de Tinoco (1877–1961), Costa Rican writer and amateur archaeologist
- María Fernández Ugarte (born 1953), Mexican politician

== See also ==
- Maria Fernandes (disambiguation)
