= José Adán Rubí Salazar =

Mexican politician

- Born: 19 December 1960 (age 65); Ixtapan de la Sal, State of Mexico, Mexico
- Occupation: Politician
- Political party: PRI

José Adán Ignacio Rubí Salazar (born 19 December 1960) is a Mexican politician from the Institutional Revolutionary Party (PRI). In the 2009 mid-terms he was elected to the Chamber of Deputies to represent the State of Mexico's 40th district during the 61st session of Congress.
