= Juan Victoria Alva =

Mexican politician

- Born: 8 February 1951 (age 75); State of Mexico, Mexico
- Occupation: Politician
- Political party: PAN

Juan Victoria Alva (born 8 February 1951) is a Mexican politician affiliated with the National Action Party (PAN). In the 2006 general election he was elected to the Chamber of Deputies to represent the State of Mexico's 40th district during the 60th session of Congress.
