= Emanuel Fernandes =

Emanuel Fernandes may refer to:

- Emanuel Jardim Fernandes (1944–2025), Portuguese politician
- Emanuel Fernandes (beach volleyball) (born 1967), beach volleyball player from Angola
