= Rosamaría Roffiel =

- Born: August 30, 1945 (age 81); Veracruz, Mexico
- Occupations: Writer, editor, production coordinator
- Known for: Mexico's first lesbian-feminist novel
- Notable work: Amora

Rosamaría Roffiel (born August 30, 1945) is a Mexican poet, novelist, journalist, and editor. Her first literary work, Amora (1989), is considered the first lesbian-feminist novel published in Mexico. She is also the author of poetry collections that refer to lesbian love, such as Corramos libres ahora (1986).

== Biography ==
Rosamaría Roffiel was born in Veracruz on August 30, 1945. She moved to Mexico City at age 20.

Self-taught in journalism, she began her professional career at the newspaper Excélsior, where she worked for more than 10 years, and later wrote for the political analysis magazine Proceso. In 1976, she was one of the founders of the first women's sexual assault support group in Mexico, Centro de Apoyo para Mujeres Violadas AC (CAMVAC). In 1979, after the victory of Daniel Ortega in Nicaragua, she left Mexico to coordinate the Sandinista publication El Trabajador for three years. In 1980 she returned to Mexico, and in 1982 she began to contribute to fem., the first feminist magazine in Latin America.. Other investigative journalist is Lizbeth Hernández who covers social and human-right issues.

In 1986 she left journalism to work as a production coordinator on foreign films. The same year, she published Corramos libres ahora, a collection of poems on lesbian themes. She followed this with !Ay Nicaragua, Nicaragüita!, a series of testimonies about her time in that country. In September 1989 she published Amora, a literary work which has been recognized as Mexico's first lesbian-feminist novel. In an interview, Roffiel recalled that she had begun writing it in 1982.

As a cathartic exercise to free me from a romantic relationship that had ended painfully, I abandoned the manuscript for five years. I took it back in 1988 and I finished it in less than a year. It was the first novel that was published in Mexico (now there is another, "Dos Mujeres", by Sara Levi Calderón). Amora is my humble contribution to the visibility of feminists and lesbians in the history of my country.

== Amora ==
Narrated in first person, Amora is set in Mexico City, and tells, in a simple way, the difficulties women experience in an environment that is heavy with machismo. It is a story based on the experiences of the author, with some fictitious elements, which highlight the relationships among a group of women living under one roof, describes how sexuality is discovered through coexistence, and how the women must act under a patriarchal system that oppresses them. The style and influence of Roffiel's work have been compared to that of Guadalupe Loaeza and Rosario Castellanos.

== Recognitions ==
In June 2019, as part of LGBT Pride Month celebrations, Rosamaría Roffiel was the subject of a tribute as one of the "protagonists of Mexican literature" at Mexico City's Palacio de Bellas Artes.

== Selected publications ==
- Irán, la religión en la revolución (1981), Editorial Posada, with José Reveles and Julio Scherer García
- ¡Ay Nicaragua, Nicaragüita! (1986), Editorial Claves Latinoamericana, Mexico, ISBN 9789688430392
- Corramos libres ahora (1986, 1994, 2007)
- Amora (1989) Planeta ISBN 9789684061972, (1997) Editorial HORASyhoras (Spain), (1999, 2009) Raya en el Agua, Mexico
- El para siempre dura una noche (1999), Editorial Sentido Contrario, Mexico, ISBN 9789686565706
- En el fondo del mar no sólo hay peces (2010), Instituto Nacional de Antropología e Historia
