= Elizabeth Hernández (model) =

American television host

- Born: April 9
- Origin: New York City (Humacao, Aguadilla, Puerto Rico)
- Occupation: Television Host
- Years active: 1977 - present
- Website: www.elizabethentuagenda.com

Elizabeth Hernández, aka “Modelo de Mujer”, is a Puerto Rican television personality, author, spokesperson, model, entrepreneur, and motivational speaker.

== Early years ==
Born in New York City to Puerto Rican parents and raised primarily in Puerto Rico, Hernández began her career in the modeling, beauty contests and entertainment field at a very early age. The family moved to mainland (USA) where she became a professional model. She joined Wilhelmina Models and Barbizon in New York. She then moved to Florida and joined Ford Models in Miami and Martha Haggman Image Development and Modeling Studio. Hernández has been featured on promotional campaigns for renowned brands in the nation and the Caribbean.

Hernández earned a bachelor's degree in Computer Science and Specialized in Business Administration and multiple certifications on Advertising and Marketing Communications from Fashion Institute of Technology. Hernández is the presenter on the television show “Elizabeth En Tu Agenda” (Elizabeth In Your Agenda) TV Show (EETA) broadcasting in USA Florida on Telemundo, Vision TV, Orange TV and other outlets and Puerto Rico Canal 13 WORO.

Hernández is a former Mrs. Puerto Rico United States ‘00-‘01. Pageant Consultant, Coordinator and Judge for regional, national and international beauty pageants. Hernández is founder/president of EH Image Development & Modeling Institute (EH Modeling). Once a year she presents a scholarship to a selected low income family to offer them the opportunity to train and make their dreams a reality.

== Motivational speaker ==
Hernández participates in conferences, seminars and workshops during the year empowering the Hispanic Families in the United States and Puerto Rico. Elizabeth is also the Founder and Co-Producer of Motivational Seminar Series “Mujer Tu Puedes” (Woman, you can!).

== Awards and recognitions ==
- 2000 Presented with a RESOLUTION by Hon. Charlie Rodriguez President of El Senado de Puerto Rico resolving that "Elizabeth Hernandez is the year 2000 Mrs. Puerto Rico United States and a role model to the Puerto Rican women in the United States"
- 2001 Recognition Award presented by Manuel A. Toro, Founder & President of La Prensa Newspaper and National Federation of Hispanic Owned Newspapers during the VIII Hispanic Media Convention.
- 2001 Presented with a RESOLUTION by Hon. Edison Misla Aldarondo, President of La Camara de Representantes de Puerto Rico resolving that "Elizabeth Hernandez is a proud representation of the Puerto Rican women"
- 2004 Selected “Celebrity of the Week” - Telemundo
- 2004 Awarded Premio Paoli “Modeling Academy of The Year” - Premios Paoli Intl.
- 2007 Awarded the “Leadership” Award - Convocatoria De Mujeres Hispanas
- 2007 Presented with a RESOLUTION by Mayor of Orange County Honorable Rich Crotty (Richard T. Crotty) and Orange County Commissioner Mildred Fernandez, District 3 resolving that “Elizabeth Hernandez, owner of EH Modeling and creator/founder of motivational seminar series “Mujer Tu Puedes! (Woman, You Can!)”, be recognized for the valuable contributions to the continuous empowerment of Women as local, state and national leaders”.
- 2008 Featured on the segment “Triunfadores” Noticias - Telemundo
- 2009 Awarded the “Women Who Make A Difference” Award, Executive Business Category presented by LaPrensa Newspaper, an ImpreMedia Co.
- 2009 Nominated to the Orlando Business Journal “Forty Under 40" Award (recognizing 40 outstanding business professionals under the age of 40).

== Volunteer services ==
- Guest Speaker. Conference. Ministerio Mujer Llena de Gracia, a ministry dedicated to provide assistance to battered and abused women (abused physically, mentally, and emotionally. Speaker/Orator of a motivational workshop for the youth and adult emphasizing on the personal growth of the individual in a spiritual, personal, and professional level.
- Convocatoria de Mujeres Hispanas: Main speaker during the opening ceremony and for the duration of the event; presenter of varies motivational workshops from the motivational seminar series “Mujer Tu Puedes-de limones, limonada!” – for the personal and professional development of all women – in body, mind and soul!
- Latino Leadership of Orlando Feria Back-To-School y Salud: Considering the high percentage of youth who are reprimanded for not dressing appropriately for school, with a few instances resulting in suspensions, Hernández wanted to present to our youth the importance of adopting and obeying the “Dress Code” established by our public schools, in a way that would be fun and “cool” for them while complying with the rules established by our school system. In order to entice their interest, she created a Fashion Show titled “Dress Cool for School”. This fashion show is developed and performed in a juvenile and very age-appropriate format to give the audience ideas to mix and match clothes that are appropriate under the school-dress code and yet “fashionable, hip!, cool and fun to wear!”
- Volunteer in the Teach-In school programs: Performing informal chats on etiquette and self-esteem to elementary and middle public schools.
- Volunteer Coordinator of a summer program titled “Highsmith Summer Character Development Series”: A governmental foster home for girls and boys ages 10–17, which emphasized the importance of developing our character and self-esteem.
- Volunteer for the “Feeding the Homeless” program: Coalition for the Homeless Center
- (seasonal) Volunteer serving as a Big-Sister mentor to young ladies between the ages of 13 thru 18 – crucial years of their personal and professional development.
- Supporter of Canine Companion for Independence
