= Benjamín Hernández Bustamante =

Mexican lawyer and politician

- Born: 30 March 1954 (age 72); Oaxaca, Oaxaca, Mexico
- Occupations: Lawyer and politician
- Political party: PRI

Benjamín Fernando Hernández Bustamante (born 30 March 1954) is a Mexican lawyer and politician affiliated with the Institutional Revolutionary Party. He served as Deputy of the LIX Legislature of the Mexican Congress as a plurinominal representative.
