= Javier Hernández Manzanares =

Mexican politician (born 1960)

- Born: 9 February 1960 (age 66); State of Mexico, Mexico
- Occupation: Politician
- Political party: PRD

Javier Hernández Manzanares (born 9 February 1960) is a Mexican politician from the Party of the Democratic Revolution. From 2006 to 2009 he served as Deputy of the LX Legislature of the Mexican Congress representing the fifth district of the State of Mexico.
