= Vasco Fernandes =

Vasco Fernandes may refer to:

- Vasco Fernandes (artist) (c. 1475-c. 1542), Portuguese Renaissance painter
- Vasco Fernandes Coutinho, captain of Espírito Santo (1490–1561), the founder of the Brazilian state of Espírito Santo
- Vasco da Gama Fernandes (1908–1991), Portuguese lawyer and politician
- Vasco Fernandes (footballer) (born 1986), Portuguese footballer
