= Lorenzo Hernández Estrada =

Mexican politician (born 1959)

- Born: 10 August 1959 (age 67); State of Mexico, Mexico
- Education: Universidad Obrera de México
- Occupation: Politician
- Political party: PRD

Lorenzo Rafael Hernández Estrada (born 10 August 1959) is a Mexican politician from the Party of the Democratic Revolution. From 2000 to 2003 he served as Deputy of the LVIII Legislature of the Mexican Congress representing the State of Mexico.
