= Antonio César Fernández =

Spanish missionary (1946–2019)

Antonio César Fernández Fernández
- Title: Salesian Missionary

Personal life
- Born: Antonio César Fernández Fernández; 7 July 1946 Pozoblanco, Córdoba, Spain
- Died: 15 February 2019 (aged 72) Noah, Boulgou Province, Burkina Faso
- Cause of death: Gunshot wounds (murdered)
- Flourished: 1981-2019
- Home town: Pozoblanco, Córdoba, Spain
- Known for: Missionary work in Africa

Religious life
- Religion: Catholic
- Denomination: Catholic Church
- Order: Salesian
- Institute: Salesians of Don Bosco
- School: Salesians of Don Bosco
- Profession: Salesian Missionary

Senior posting
- Based in: Togo, Ivory Coast, Burkina Faso

Antonio César Fernández Fernández (7 July 1946 – 15 February 2019), was a Spanish Salesian missionary in Togo, Ivory Coast and Burkina Faso.

== Biography and mission ==
He was born in the village of Pozoblanco, in the province of Córdoba, southern Spain. When he was 16 years he felt the Salesian vocation and began the novitiate worried about poverty and the lack of priests. He was a professor at Santo Domingo Savio school in Úbeda between 1972 and 1976. Between 1988 and 1998 he was novice master. He was a missionary in several countries of Africa since 1981.

In 1982 he founded the Salesian presence in Togo, specifically in the city of Lomé, where he began school, parish, workshop and leisure activities with young people. He continued his mission as a missionary in the Ivory Coast, in a street children's play that is concretized in a parish and a youth center. He then went to Burkina Faso, initially in the city of Bobo-Dioulasso, where there is a professional center and a youth center. At the time of his death he was in Ouagadougou, where the Salesians have a women's promotion center and do activities with the children in the neighborhood.

== Murder ==
He died after receiving three shots on 15 February 2019 in the afternoon on the crossfire of a jihadist attack with twenty motorcycles against Noah's customs office in the province of Boulgou, 40 kilometers from the southern border of Burkina Faso. After holding a meeting in Lomé with Salesians from West African Francophone, he was returning to his community in Ouagadougou with other religious who were able to survive. In addition to César, in the attack four or 6 local officials died, according to the source.

The Prime Minister of Spain, Pedro Sánchez, expressed his condolences to his relatives for his death. His hometown, Pozoblanco, decreed two days of mourning. Few days before he died he recorded a video that was widely disseminated after his death, where he explained his vocation.
