= Antonio Fernández (football executive) =

Antonio Fernández (born 27 August 1970 in Guadalcacín, Jerez de la Frontera) is a Spanish football coach, scout and director. Throughout his career, he has worked as a scout and analyst for the Royal Spanish Football Federation (RFEF), technical director for Sevilla FC and Valencia CF, as well as director of football at clubs such as Xerez CD and Málaga CF.

== Career ==
=== Sevilla ===
In 2000, Fernández joined Sevilla as the scout for the club's academy and reserves team, also known as Sevilla Atlético. He quickly became part of the first team scouting staff and was subsequently designated head of international football recruitment. At this stage, he forged a reputation for personally discovering Dani Alves, a young, talented player, who he insisted in signing after seeing him in action in the U20 tournament of Alcúdia and the South American tournament U20 (Uruguay 2003). Soon after, Monchi, Sevilla's sports director, appointed Fernández as the technical director of the club. In the next three seasons, Fernández recommended and oversaw the signing of players such as Júlio Baptista, Renato, Adriano Correia, and Luís Fabiano, among others. Fernández' career at Sevilla culminated with the achievement of the 2006 UEFA Cup, the European Super Cup 2006, and the proclamation "best club in the world" by the International Federation of Football History & Statistics (IFFHS).

=== Xerez ===
In the 2006/07 season, Fernández took over as director of football of Xerez, a club of Spain's Segunda División league. The team led the league table for 14 weeks, but at the end, had to give way to rivals with greater financial budget and had to settle for the 8th position.

=== Valencia ===
Fernández's good job leading Xerez did not go unnoticed, and in July 2007, he received a call from Miguel Ángel Ruiz, football director of Valencia CF, who offered Fernández the role of technical director of the club. In his first and only year in the team, Fernández oversaw the signings of Edwiges Maduro, Manuel Fernandes and Éver Banega among others, and saw the season culminate with the celebration of the 2008 Copa del Rey title.

=== Spain national team ===
That same summer, Fernando Hierro, sports director of the Royal Spanish Football Federation (RFEF), offered Fernández a spot in the coaching staff of the Spain national team, as the scout and analyst of the senior team. With the 2010 World Cup as his main target, Fernández accepted the proposal, and for the next two and a half years, tracked the top Spanish players to be called up by Vicente del Bosque for his team. On July 11, 2010, the Spain national team defeated the Netherlands (1–0), and for the first time in history, became world champion.

=== Málaga ===
Following this success, Abdullah bin Nasser bin Abdullah Al Ahmed Al Thani, sheik owner of Málaga CF, signed Fernández as the director of football. Fernández' spell at the club ended in August 2012, with Malaga having qualified for the Champions League group stage for the first time in its history.

=== La Liga ===
Following his departure from Malaga, Fernández spent three years working for White Elephant Academy, before in 2016 joining La Liga de Fútbol Profesional - working on projects in Southeast Asia, particularly Indonesia.

=== Cádiz ===
In 2018, Fernández joined Cádiz CF as a scout.

=== Return to Sevilla ===
In 2021, Fernández rejoined Sevilla as the Director of International Youth Recruitment, rejoining long-time collaborator Monchi.

== Tribute ==
In July 2010, the neighborhood board of Guadalcacín approved the naming of the local stadium "Estadio Municipal Antonio Fernández Marchán", in recognition of Fernández distinguished work in the Spain national team.
