= Benjamin Fernandes =

Tanzanian television personality (born 1992)

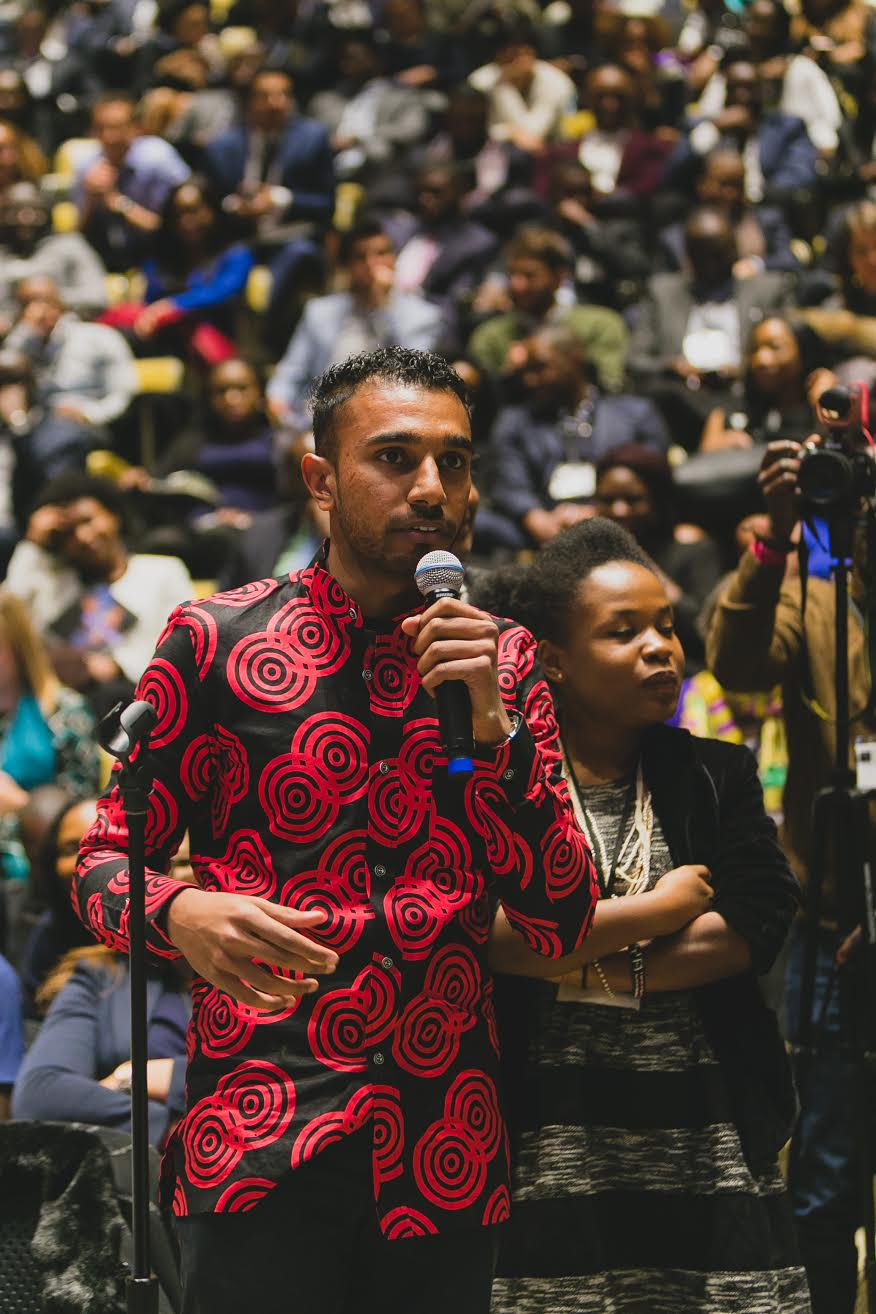
- Fernandes speaking at Harvard Business School
- Born: 25 November 1992 (age 33); Tanzania
- Education: University of Northwestern - St. Paul (B.A.) Stanford Graduate School of Business (M.B.A.) John F. Kennedy School of Government (Exec.)
- Employer(s): The Bill and Melinda Gates Foundation, NALA

Benjamin Fernandes (born 25 November 1992) is a Tanzanian entrepreneur and former national television presenter. He worked at The Bill and Melinda Gates Foundation in the United States in their Digital Team and Financial Services team. He is the first Tanzanian to attend Stanford Graduate School of Business as an Africa MBA Fellow and the youngest African to ever be accepted to Stanford Graduate School of Business. In 2017, Fernandes became the first Tanzanian in history to attend both Stanford Graduate School of Business and Harvard John F. Kennedy School of Government for an executive education program.

== Early life ==
Raised in Tanzania, Fernandes was born to Pastor Vernon and Anny Fernandes in Dar es Salaam, Tanzania. Fernandes attended Haven of Peace Academy on scholarship. Fernandes was given a conditional scholarship offer by the University of Northwestern - St. Paul, in Roseville, Minnesota, Fernandes performed well academically during his time at UNW and he also managed to hold presidentship of numerous clubs and groups on campus. Finally, he graduated with top honours at the University of Northwestern. After Northwestern, he returned to Tanzania and volunteered as a community organizer in Dar es Salaam. In addition, he worked with his sister for their church started by his father in Tanzania to co-found an orphanage called Diamond Village. They cleared a field in Bunju, Dar es Salaam to build the orphanage, teaching the children English and Mathematics.

== TV career ==
Fernandes began his career as a television personality from the age of 17 when he worked at Agape Television Network where his father Rev. Dr. Fernandes was one of the directors. Fernandes was then moved into national TV. He began hosting sports shows and later started interviewing politicians and entrepreneurs. and continued his work in the television industry where he built mobile money products for TV subscription packages. In 2012, Fernandes received national attention during the London 2012 Olympics as a national television presenter in Tanzania. In mid-September 2016, he was featured on several live television shows on Clouds TV Tanzania, CNBC Africa, and TV1 Tanzania.

== Stanford ==
In 2014, he was accepted to Stanford Graduate School of Business, winning a $160,000 Stanford Africa MBA Fellowship to attend–an award received by 8 students from 8000 African applicants to Stanford. In August 2015, Fernandes moved to Palo Alto, California to begin his time at Stanford Graduate School of Business. He is part of the Africa Business club and has been working on a financial technology project to launch in Tanzania. In January 2016, he was selected by TRUE Africa as one of the "Top 16 Africans leading change in 2016.". Shortly after, FastJet airlines featured his work in Tanzania in their online airline magazine. He was listed as a "Voice of Hope for Tanzania." In March 2016, he was selected to attend the MBA World Summit in Miami, Florida, and, at the conference, he was awarded as the best speaker for the event. He was presented with the MBA World Summit Award for 2016.

In 2016, Fernandes worked at the Bill and Melinda Gates Foundation in Seattle, Washington before returning to his final year of business school at Stanford Graduate School of Business. Fernandes continued to work with the Bill and Melinda Gates Foundation on a consultancy basis until after his graduation from Stanford.

In 2017, Fernandes won several awards at Stanford Graduate School of Business. Fernandes won the Frances and Arjay Miller Award in Social Innovation for his work in developing the financial services sector in Tanzania. Additionally, he won the Miller Social Change Leadership award nominated by fellow students and professors at Stanford Graduated School of Business.

== Return home to Tanzania ==
On June 17, 2017, Fernandes graduated from Stanford Graduate School of Business and decided to return home to Tanzania. A decision that stunned many Tanzanians given his potential salary offerings in the United States. Stanford Graduate School of Business has the highest post MBA Salary than any other school in the world. His decision to return home was covered all over the press in Tanzania, initially through a viral interview video by MillardAyo, mentioning his potential salary offerings he could have received in the United States which was shared across the country, then making the front page of national newspaper, Mwananchi.

=== Youth Seminars ===
Fernandes has held 26 seminars on entrepreneurship in 4 different regions across Tanzania, with over 22,000 people in cumulative attendance. Government officials show up in support of Fernandes' youth initiatives around the country and Fernandes started to focus on women empowerment by engaging fellow Tanzanian celebrities including Idris Sultan and Millard Ayo and a few others.

=== Tanzania Tourism and animal conservation ===
Fernandes is an active contributor to the tourism industry in Tanzania, Since 2015, Fernandes and his sister have hosted over 1000 graduate students from the United States. Every year, he hosts a trek with graduate students from Stanford and Harvard in Tanzania, hiking up Mount Kilimanjaro, going on safari through Ngorongoro Crater and the Serengeti, visiting Zanzibar and finally exposing his peers to business investment opportunities in Tanzania. Fernandes uses tourism as a way to support the community, building solar panels in remote regions of Tanzania and Zanzibar, providing them with electricity for the first time. Fernandes is also a brand ambassador for WildAid Africa, an organisation that seeks to promote aimal conservation in Africa.

== Harvard ==
October 2017, Fernandes became the first Tanzanian in history to attend both (Stanford Graduate School of Business - MBA) and (Harvard John F. Kennedy School of Government).

On, October 8, 2017, Fernandes began his first class at Harvard Kennedy School of Government for a program in executive education. Fernandes also becomes the youngest person in history to be accepted to Harvard Kennedy School of Executive education, a program catered to senior executives in business. Fernandes received a full scholarship to attend the executive program at Harvard.

== Entrepreneurship ==
At the age of 24, Fernandes founded NALA, where he currently serves as founder and CEO. NALA is, an international financial technology company that enables people and businesses to make cross-border payments between the USA, UK and Europe to Africa. Nala was the first East African fintech company to be selected for Y-Combinator in the USA. In 2022, NALA raised $10m backed by Accel Partners, Y-Combinator, Amplo and Bessemer Ventures. Other NALA investors include angels such as Alex Boazziz, the founder of Deel, Vlad Tenev, the founder of Robinhood and Jonas, the founder of Monzo Bank in the UK. In 2022, NALA became one of the first African tech companies to sign contracts with Apple Pay and Google Pay. In 2023, NALA announced their recent partnership with Mpesa. This enables 21 countries around the world to send money directly to Mpesa wallets.

== Awards ==
Fernandes has been selected to receive numerous awards throughout his tertiary education and career. In 2020, Fernandes was listed as the 15th most influential Tanzanian. In 2022, Fernandes was listed in the inaugural ROW100 most influential technology leaders in the world.
