= Antonio Fernández Bordas =

Spanish violinist and musical teacher

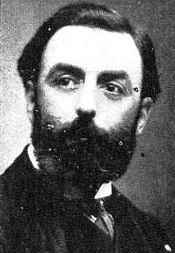
Antonio Fernández Bordas; photograph by Kaulak

Antonio Fernández Bordas (12 January 1870– 18 February 1950) was a Spanish violinist and musical teacher.

== Personal life and career ==
His musical beginnings were guided by his uncle, Antonio Fernández, the choirmaster at Ourense Cathedral. He gave his first concert at the age of seven in Pontevedra and soon moved to Madrid, where he performed under the stage name "Niño de Benavente" (Child of Benavente) and trained at the Conservatory of Music under the renowned instrumentalist Jesús de Monasterio. At the same time, he earned a doctorate in Law from the Central University of Madrid.

In 1907, he succeeded his teacher, Monasterio, as a professor at the Madrid Conservatory. A few years later, in 1910, he took on the role of secretary, and subsequently served as the institution's director between 1921 and 1940. Later that year in 1921, he was appointed to the chair of violin virtuosity at the Royal Higher Conservatory of Music in Madrid.

During his tenure, the Conservatory was evicted from the Teatro Real by a Royal Order from the Ministry of Public Instruction dated November 14, 1925; the order declared the building to be in a state of ruin and mandated the urgent suspension of classes, thus beginning a long period of displacement for the institution across various buildings and locations in Madrid. Bordas was remarkably adept at adapting to changing political situations: he served as director under the constitutional regime, the dictatorship of Primo de Rivera, the waning monarchy, most of the Second Republic, and the early months of the Franco regime, until his retirement in 1940. His tenure was characterized by resistance to innovation and the isolation of the Conservatory from the country's musical life. Significant appointments made during his tenure included Oscar Esplá as professor of "Folklore in Composition" and Eduardo Martínez Torner as professor of "Folklore Practice." Shortly after the outbreak of the Civil War, Fernández Bordas was dismissed from his post; he regained the position in 1939, the same year the Conservatory relocated to premises at the Teatro Alcázar that were wholly inadequate.

He was a leading figure of the Spanish school of violin playing. He enjoyed an extensive career as a concert artist, performing with the Madrid Quartet Society, the Concert Society, and the Madrid Symphony Orchestra. With the latter two organizations, he served as a violin soloist and concertmaster, and later as conductor. He was also the first violinist of the Royal Chapel, While we occasionally formed various chamber music ensembles that included musicians such as Conrado del Campo, Víctor Mirecki, Manuel de Falla, and Juan Ruiz Casaux.

He was a full member of the Royal Academy of Fine Arts of San Fernando, an institution he joined by delivering an address on the evolution of bowed string instruments.
