= James Fernandes =

Indian footballer (born 1994)

Personal information
- Full name: James Fernandes
- Date of birth: 26 June 1994 (age 32)
- Place of birth: Benaulim, Goa, India
- Position: Forward

Team information
- Current team: Churchill Brothers

Youth career
- Salgaocar

Senior career*
Years	Team	Apps	(Gls)
- Santa Cruz Cavelossim
2015–2016	Salgaocar	1	(0)
2016–2018	Sporting Goa		
2018	Salgaocar		
2018–	Churchill Brothers		
- * Club domestic league appearances and goals as of 09:19, 17 April 2021 (UTC)

James Fernandes (born 26 June 1994) is an Indian footballer who plays as a forward for Goa Professional League club Churchill Brothers.

== Club career ==
Born in Benaulim, Goa, Fernandes began his career as part of the Salgaocar youth team. In 2008, he participated with the under-15 side during the Nike U-15 Manchester United Premier Cup. In 2013, he was part of the Salgaocar side which won the Goa Football Association state under-18 league. The next season, he was promoted to the under-19 squad which participated in the I-League U19.

During the summer of 2014, Fernandes had a short spell with Goa Professional League club Santa Cruz Cavelossim. Prior to the start of the 2014–15 season, Fernandes was promoted into the Salgaocar first team for their I-League campaign. He made his professional debut for the club on 23 January 2015 against Royal Wahingdoh. Fernandes came on as an 83rd-minute substitute for Karma Tsewang in the 0–1 defeat. This would be his only appearance that season in the I-League, before returning to the I-League squad for the next season following the Goa Professional League campaign.

In January 2016, Fernandes joined Sporting Goa for their Goa Professional League season. With Sporting Goa, Fernandes won his first league title and scored in the final match of the season against Vasco. In 2018, Fernandes briefly returned to Salgaocar for Goa Pro League matches before joining Churchill Brothers. While with Churchill Brothers, Fernandes won his second state league title in 2019–20.

== Career statistics ==
As of match played 23 January 2015

Appearances and goals by club, season and competition
Club	Season	League			Cup		Continental		Total	
Club	Season	Division	Apps	Goals	Apps	Goals	Apps	Goals	Apps	Goals
Salgaocar	2014–15	I-League	1	0	—		—		1	0
Career total			1	0	0	0	0	0	1	0

== Honours ==
Sporting Goa

- Goa Professional League: 2015–16

Churchill Brothers

- Goa Professional League: 2019–20
- Goa Police Cup runner-up: 2018
