= Mario Fernandes =

Mario Fernandes may refer to:

- Mário Gil Fernandes (born 1982), Portuguese basketball player
- Mário Fernandes (born 1990), Brazilian-born Russian footballer
- Mário Fernandes da Graça Machungo (1940–2020), Mozambican politician
