= Sabino Hernández Téllez =

Mexican politician

Sabino Hernández Téllez (born October 29, 1940) is a Mexican politician.

Born in León, Guanajuato, Hernández Téllez became active in the student movement in Mexico. Between 1952 and 1954 he was a member of the state committee of the Nayarit Students Federation. In 1959 he became the general secretary of the Normal Students Society.

Hernández Téllez obtained a degree in history in 1964. He worked as a history teacher between 1959 and 1982, becoming a professor in history and philosophy in 1965.

He joined the Popular Socialist Party (PPS) in 1963. In 1968 he became a member of the Central Committee of the party. In 1972 he became the general secretary of the party in Nayarit.

In 1975 he was elected to the state legislature of Nayarit, but he soon renounced his seat in protest against electoral fraud. He left PPS, and in 1976 he became a founding Central Committee member of the Mexican People's Party (PPM).

He was elected to parliament in 1979 as a PPM candidate. In parliament he sat in committees on fishing, editorial affairs, federal transportation and consumer goods distribution.

In 1980 he became the coordinator of the secretariat of the Central Committee of PPM.
