= Benjamín Félix Hernández Ruiz =

Mexican politician

- Born: Oaxaca, Mexico
- Occupation: Politician
- Political party: PRI

Benjamín Félix Hernández Ruiz is a Mexican politician from the Institutional Revolutionary Party. In 2003 he served as Deputy of the LVIII Legislature of the Mexican Congress representing Oaxaca.
