= Paula Hernández Olmos =

Mexican politician

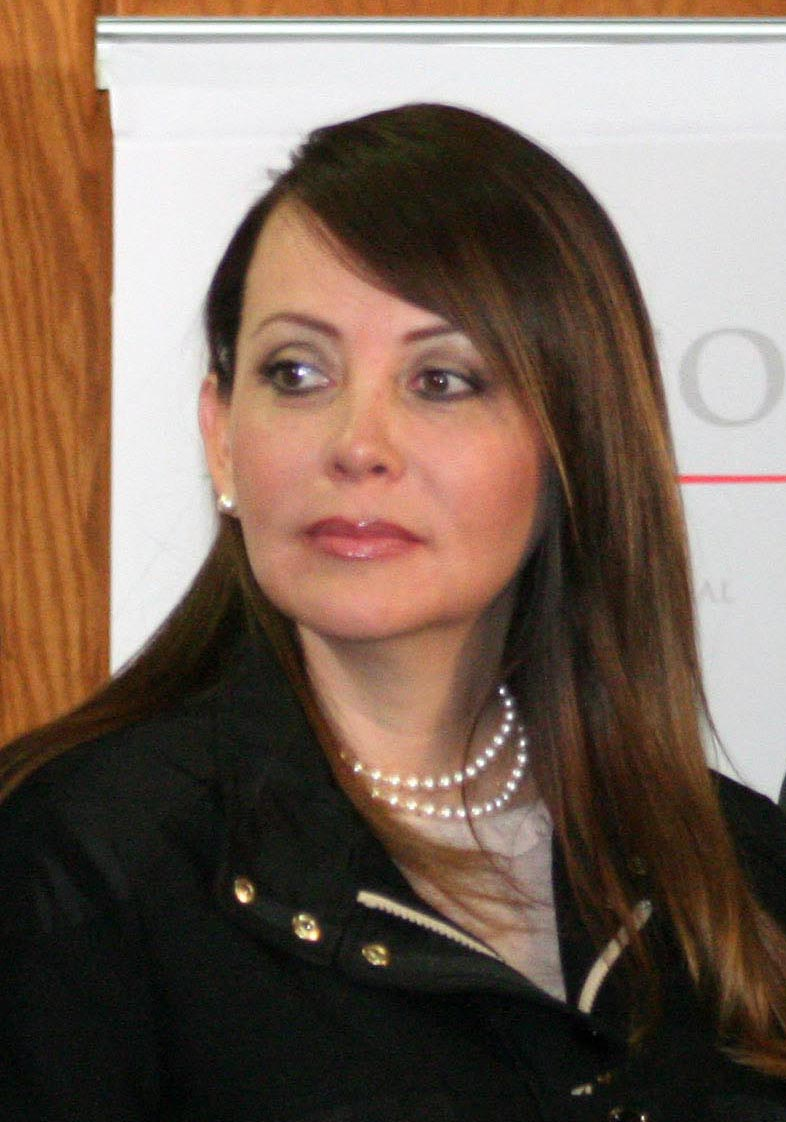
- Born: 13 April 1972 (age 54); Pachuca, Hidalgo, Mexico
- Education: ITESM
- Occupation: Politician
- Political party: PRI

Paula Angélica Hernández Olmos (born 13 April 1972) is a Mexican politician from the Institutional Revolutionary Party. From 2009 to 2012 she served as Deputy of the LXI Legislature of the Mexican Congress representing Hidalgo.
