= Francisco Hernández Juárez =

Mexican trade union leader and politician

- Born: 3 September 1949 (age 76); Mexico City, Mexico
- Occupations: Trade union leader and politician
- Political party: PRD

Francisco Hernández Juárez (born 3 September 1949) is a Mexican trade union leader politician from the Party of the Democratic Revolution. From 2009 to 2012 he served as Deputy of the LXI Legislature of the Mexican Congress representing the Federal District.
