= Ruth Hernández Martínez =

Mexican politician

- Born: 17 June 1962 (age 64); Baja California, Mexico
- Education: Universidad Iberoamericana Tijuana
- Political party: PAN

Ruth Trinidad Hernández Martínez (born 17 June 1962) is a Mexican politician affiliated with the National Action Party. She served as Deputy of the LIX Legislature of the Mexican Congress as a plurinominal representative.
