= Maria Helena de Senna Fernandes =

Macanese tourism director

Maria Helena de Senna Fernandes (Chinese: 文綺華) is a Macanese civil servant, currently heading the Macau government's tourism office. She is a recipient of the Medal of Merit from the Macau government, an office-holder in the Pacific Asia Travel Association, and serves on several government committees.

== Career ==
Senna Fernandes worked for a year in banking before she joined the Macau government's tourism department in 1988, working initially in their marketing department, then in promotions, and later serving as deputy director. Since 2012, she has been the director of the Macau Government Tourism Office, replacing João Manuel Costa Antunes and heading the regulation of Macau's significant tourism industry. In 2021, her tenure as director was extended to 2023.

She also serves on a number of government committees in Macau, including acting as the co-coordinator of the Tourism Crisis Management Office, and as a member of the Macau government's Economic Development Committee, Cultural Advisory Committee, Creative Industries Committee, and the Urban Planning Committee. She also serves on the committee that organizes the Macau Grand Prix, and during her tenure as tourism director, oversaw the renovation and reopening of the Macau Grand Prix Museum in 2021.

In 2016, the Macau government presented her with the Medal of Merit, for her services to tourism. In 2018, she was elected the treasurer of the Pacific Asia Travel Association. Senna Fernandes has also participated in the Macau government's response to the COVID-19 pandemic, especially with respect to repatriating Macanese citizens.

== Biography ==
Maria Helena de Senna Fernandes was born in Macau, and her family is of Eurasian descent. She studied business administration at the University of Macau, graduating in 1987. She speaks several languages, including English, Cantonese, Mandarin, and Portuguese.
