= Nomi Fernandes =

Swiss glamour model and former showgirl

Nomi Fernandes (born 1985) is a former Swiss glamour model and former showgirl.

== Early life ==
Nomi Fernandes (1992), born and raised in Zurich, Switzerland,. She has Venezuelan and Portuguese genes from her mother and Swiss-South African genes from her father.

== Career ==
Trained as a professional classical dancer in Europe, Nomi's modeling career began in 2006 when she landed her very first photo-shoot for the cover of a popular American fitness magazine. By 2007 she had already become the first Swiss centerfold for Playboy magazine. In 2008, Playboy called again and asked Nomi to be their Playmate of the Month, Nomi agreed and made not only centerfold in April but also a celebrated cover girl throughout Europe. In July 2009, she was invited to appear on her second Playboy cover, this time for the Romania edition. In 2010 Nomi was the March Girl in the Playboy Calendar. In 2011 Nomi appeared for the fourth time on the Playboy Cover for the Hungarian edition. In March 2015, Nomi appeared in Playboy-Europe again. In total, since 2008, Nomi has appeared on the cover of Playboy magazine four times or in a Playboy editorial, a record five times, as a Swiss model!

In 2010, with her modeling career booming, Nomi started her own agency for glamour models, Babes Management. Babes Management represents and offers professional glamour models for editorials, advertising, Internet, conventions, commercials, TV and films and VIP events. After years of unprecedented success in the European market, Babes Management was ready to expand worldwide with www.babesanddolls.com, a fashion label for women.

In 2013 A-list director Michael Bay needed Russian-Israeli model Bar Paly to convincingly portray a stripper girl in "Pain & Gain", a thriller movie (based on the real life activities of a trio of bodybuilders involved in extortion and kidnapping that made headlines in the nineties) starring Dwayne "The Rock" Johnson, Mark Wahlberg, and Anthony Mackie. Having been impressed by Nomi’s trained dancing background when the two had met at a prior casting, Michael immediately contacted Nomi to instruct Bar Paly the art of striptease and pole-dancing. Nomi confirmed that the task was a challenge: "Bar had no dance background, so it was hard work to prepare her for the role. But the work has turned us into good friends. Bar is a wonderful, down to earth girl". Bar has returned the compliment:" Nomi is a great dancer; I will never be able to move like her. We have become inevitably closer, because she saw me in rather awkward poses. ”The two trained together for three weeks, 6 hours a day. The outcome was clearly visible on the screen as “Pain and Gain” became a box office success worldwide and received critical acclaim. "They did a super job." - Michael Bay.
