= César Emiliano Hernández Ochoa =

César Emiliano Hernández Ochoa is a Mexican public official, lawyer and academic from Durango, Mexico. Hernández has a long trajectory inside the Mexican government, having worked in every Mexican federal administration since Ernesto Zedillo and received presidential appointments both from Andrés Manuel López Obrador and Enrique Peña Nieto. From December 1, 2018, until May 15, 2020, he served as National Commissioner at the Commission for Better Regulation. From February 5, 2014, until November 21, 2017, he served as Deputy Secretary of Energy for Electricity at Mexico's Department of Energy.

== Early life ==
Hernández holds two law degrees from UNAM, Licenciatura en Derecho (LLB, 1989), and Doctorado en Derecho (SJD, 2007). He also holds a Master of Arts in Law and Diplomacy (MALD, 1994) from the Fletcher School of Law and Diplomacy.

He has served as National Commissioner at the National Commission for Better Regulation (by Presidential appointment); Head of the Planning, Institutional Relations and International Affairs Unit, at the Federal Economic Competition Commission; Deputy Secretary of Energy for Electricity, at the Ministry of Energy (by Presidential appointment); General Counsel of the Ministry of Energy; General Director of Foreign Trade at the Ministry of Economy; General Director at the Office of the General Counsel of the Federal Executive; and General Director for Long Distance Telephone Services at the Federal Commission of Telecommunications.

== Director General for Foreign Trade, at the Ministry of Economy ==
As Director General for Foreign Trade and President of the Foreign Trade Commission (COCEX). Mr. Hernandez led the Single Window for International Trade Project (Ventanilla Única de Comercio Exterior, VUCEM), together with Customs Mexico. It was the first large project that constructed a single electronic system to process customs and foreign trade authorizations in Mexico. The Single Window was launched by President Felipe Calderón together with Bruno Ferrari, Secretary of Economy, on January 16, 2012.

Mr. Hernandez also coordinated the development of Mexico's regulatory system for export controls. Together with officials from the Ministry of Foreign Affairs, Mr. Hernandez negotiated the accession of Mexico to the international export controls systems, the Wassenaar Arrangement on Export Controls for Conventional Arms and Dual-Use Goods and Technologies, the Australia Group, and the Nuclear Suppliers Group. On January 20, 2012, Mexico was admitted to the Wassenaar Arrangement.

== Deputy Secretary of Energy for Electricity, at the Ministry of Energy ==
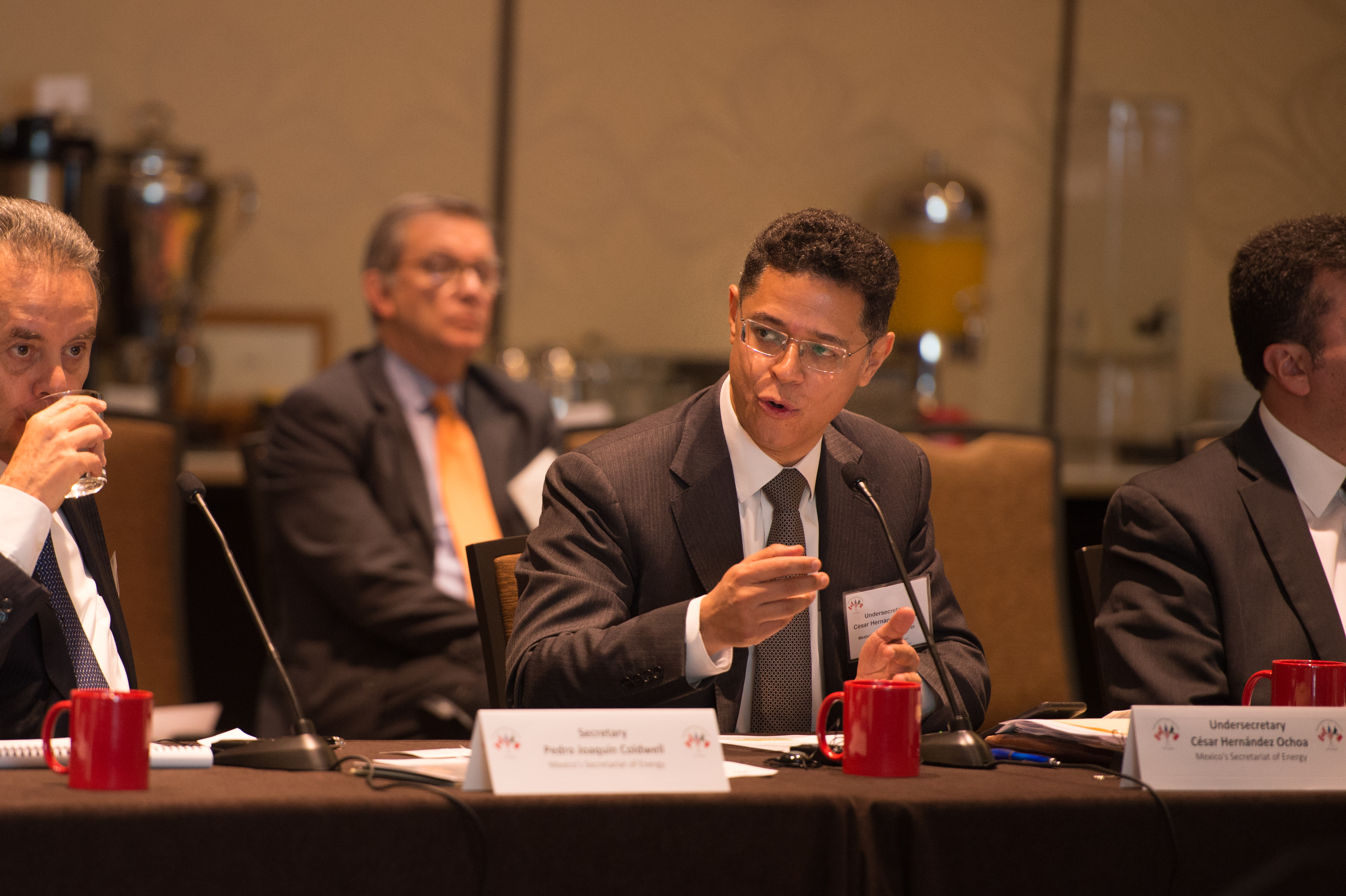

Mr. Hernandez was a leading figure in the 2013-2014 Mexican Energy Reform. Initially he served as Chief Legal Counsel at the Ministry of Energy on February 1, 2013, and as Secretary of the Board of Directors of Petróleos Mexicanos (Pemex) and Secretary of the Governing Board of Comisión Federal de Electricidad (CFE). He served on those positions for one year.

On February 5, 2014, he was appointed Deputy Secretary of Energy for Electricity by President Enrique Peña Nieto. As Deputy Secretary of Electricity between 2014 and 2017 he coordinated the design and implementation of the most comprehensive legal and regulatory reform in the power sector of Mexico since 1938, creating the wholesale electricity market, establishing an independent system operator, unbundling Mexico's national electric utility (CFE), and designing clean energy certificates to enforce the national clean energy goals for the sector. Furthermore, he led the team that designed and implemented the first three long-term power auctions for renewable energy that resulted in some of the lowest solar and wind electricity prices in the world in 2016 and 2017.

During his four-year tenure as Mexico's Deputy Secretary of Energy for Electricity, César Hernández and his team at the Ministry of Energy worked in the implementation of Mexico's 2013 Constitutional Energy Reform. Among others, four new laws directly related to the electricity sector were published, and the Ministry of Energy electricity technical team coordinated by Dr. Hernández was instrumental in its drafting: the Electricity Industry Law and the Geothermal Energy Law, the Law of the Federal Electricity Commission, and the Energy Transition Law.

=== Creation of Mexico's First Electricity Markets ===
Additionally, during Dr. Hernández' tenure as Deputy Secretary, the Ministry of Energy wielded regulatory powers for the creation of a new Wholesale Electricity Power Market that would later be transferred to independent regulatory bodies (the Energy Regulatory Commission, CRE; and the National Center for Energy Control, CENACE). The 2014 Electricity Industry Law gave the Ministry of Energy powers to "issue the first Electricity Power Market Rules on one sole occasion". Accordingly, several regulations were published as part of the first Electricity Power Market Rules. In this matter, the Secretary of Energy published the Bases of the Electricity Market (September 8, 2015) along with several manuals. (Note: the Long-term Auctions Manual (November 19th, 2015), Account Status, Billing and Payments Manual (March 15th, 2016), Compliance Guarantee Manual (March 16th, 2016), Dispute Resolution Manual (March 16th, 2016), Manual of Legacy Interconnection Contracts (May 13th, 2016), Short-term Energy Market Manual (June 17th, 2016), Manual of the Market Information System (July 4th, 2016), Manual for Registration and Accreditation of Market Participants (July 15th, 2016), Manual for the Allocation of Legacy Transmission Financial Rights (September 14th, 2016), Market Manual for Power Balance (September 22nd, 2016), Manual of Interconnection of Generation Plants with Capacity less than 0.5 MW (December 15th, 2016) and the Manual of Bilateral Transactions and Registration of Electricity Coverage Contracts (January 20th, 2017).)

=== Creation and Implementation of Mexico's first Renewable Portfolio Standard ===
In the matter of transition to clean energies, during Dr. Hernandez's tenure the Ministry of Energy published the Guidelines that establish the criteria for the granting of Clean Energy Certificates and the requirements for their acquisition (October 31, 2014), and the Clean Energy Certificate Mandatory Requirements for 2018, 2019, 2020, 2021 and 2022.

=== Independent Long Term Planning of Electricity System Development ===
The Electricity Industry Law established that the Ministry of Energy would publish, each year, 15 year programs for the development of the Mexican electricity system (formerly planning was professional, but not independent, done by the national electric utility, CFE). In the matter of electricity system planning, during Dr. Hernández's tenure the Ministry published the first three Programs for the Development of the National Electricity System (PRODESEN), the 2015-2029 PRODESEN, the 2016-2030 PRODESEN and the 2017-2031 PRODESEN. Additionally, it published the 2017 Smart Grid Program.

=== Universal Access to Energy. Creation and Implementation of FSUE ===
In the matter of universal access to electricity, during Dr. Hernández tenure, the Ministry of Energy created and started the operation of the Universal Electricity Service Fund (FSUE) established in the Electricity Industry Law, chaired by the Deputy Secretary of Energy for Electricity, which financed electricity access for over 800,000 Mexicans not previously covered. The Ministry published the Policies and Strategies for the electrification of rural communities and marginalized urban areas (March 29, 2017), which contemplated two different alternatives for taking electricity service to Mexicans no previously attended: a) extending coverage of CFE's basic service to communities located at a distance 5 km or less from the electricity distribution grid, and b) installing off-grid systems. In implementation of the Policies and Strategies, the Universal Electricity Service Fund (FSUE), through CFE and FIDE, financed the extension of the distribution grid and the installation of off-grid electricity systems. By the end of 2017 CFE had extended service to 2,011 towns with 352,938 inhabitants not previously attended. And FIDE, the government entity in charge of competitively assigning off-grid projects, reported that by the end of 2018, contracts had been assigned to 37 companies to develop off-grid projects in 1,596 towns, to provide electricity to 138,304 inhabitants not previously covered.

=== Resignation from the Ministry of Energy ===
Dr. Hernández resigned from the Energy Ministry on November 23, 2017.

== Federal Economic Competition Commission (COFECE) ==
On December 1, 2017, Dr. Hernández was appointed Head of the Unit for Planning, Institutional Relations and International Affairs (UPVAI) at the Federal Economic Competition Commission (COFECE), Mexico's federal antitrust agency. UPVAI is the COFECE Unit in charge of, among other things, competition advocacy. During his ten-month tenure, COFECE published several competition advocacy studies, including "Rethinking competition in the Digital Economy" (March 1, 2018), "Transition to Competitive Markets in Energy: LP Gas" (June 18, 2018), "A Competition Agenda towards integrity in Public Procurement" (July 20, 2018), and prepared "Market Power and Social Welfare" (October 12, 2018). It organized, together with the Institute for Legal Research of UNAM, an International Seminar on Attorney-Client Privilege in Antitrust Investigations (May 30, 2018), and published a recommendation to the Ministry of Communications and Transport to eliminate the exclusivity exercised by Aeropuertos y Servicios Auxiliares (ASA), a government owned enterprise, in the services for storage, commercialization and retail of fuels for aircraft at national airports.

Dr. Hernández left his position at COFECE on September 30, 2018, to become part of the Ministry of Economy transition team of President-elect López Obrador headed by future Secretary Graciela Márquez Colín; he was replaced by David Lamb de Valdés.

== National Commission for Better Regulation (CONAMER) ==
On December 1, 2018, he was proposed as National Commissioner of the National Commission for Better Regulation (CONAMER), by Secretary of Economy Graciela Márquez Colín, and appointed to that position by President Andrés Manuel López Obrador. CONAMER is Mexico's central regulatory coordinating body (akin to the US Office of Information and Regulatory Affairs, OIRA). It is in charge of ex ante and ex post regulatory impact assessments (RIAs) on Federal regulations, implementing programs for simplification and improvement of Federal administrative procedures, and operating several specific better regulations programs together with other federal, state and municipal authorities. The National Commissioner is also the Secretary of the National Council on Better Regulation which coordinates all the federal and local authorities on this subject matter.

=== General Law on Better Regulation ===
During his one and a half year tenure as National Commissioner, César Hernández implemented Mexico's 2018 General Law on Better Regulation (published on May 18, 2018, in the last year of the Peña Nieto Administration). This implied starting the operation of the new better regulation programs and governance bodies mandated by the 2018 Law, which as per its Transitory Articles were due to be implemented in 2019. Accordingly, CONAMER elaborated and published the Guidelines for specific Better Regulation Programs (May 20, 2019). Guidelines of the National Program on Oral Mercantile Trials (JOM), Guidelines of the Program on Priority Sectoral Reforms (PROREFORMA), Guidelines of the Program on Simplified Window for Construction Permits (VECS), Guidelines of the Program on Fast Business Licensing (SARE) and the Program for Certification of Operation of Fast Business Licensing (PROSARE), Guidelines of the Program on Legal and Economic Administrative Reform Method (MEJORA), and Guideline of the Program on Administrative Burden Easing (SIMPLIFICA). Published in the Mexican Official Gazette on May 20, 2019. organized the installation and first session of the National Council on Better Regulation, The National Council on Better Regulation was installed on August 19, 2019, with the participation of, among others, the Secretary of Economy Graciela Márquez, the Secretary of Interior Olga Sánchez Cordero, the Mexico City Chief of Government Claudia Sheimbaum, and the Governor of the State of Yucatán Mauricio Vila. submitted to the National Council and published of the National Strategy for Better Regulation oversaw the appointment of the members and installation of the National Observatory on Better Regulation.

=== Promotion of Local Laws on Better Regulation ===
CONAMER also promoted state laws that were harmonized with the institutions and provisions of the 2018 General Law. Thus, CONAMER published a Model State Law on Better Regulation (February 1, 2019), and promoted the approval and publication of State Laws on Better Regulation by the 32 Local Congresses of the country. Accordingly, Commissioner Hernández attended meetings of Local Better Regulation Councils and met with the Governors of the States of Campeche, Chihuahua, Colima, Durango, Guanajuato, Jalisco, Mexico, Michoacán, Querétaro, San Luis Potosí, Sonora, Veracruz and Yucatán. By March 31, 2020, 27 such new State Laws on Better Regulation had been published.

=== Law on the Promotion of Public Trust ===
CONAMER promoted with Congress the approval of a new Law on the Promotion of Public Trust. The new Law regulates the work of inspectors and the conduct of inspections –in harmony with the General Law on Better Regulation-, and provides for benefits to citizens that declared to be in compliance with legal and regulatory requirements. CONAMER is the entity in charge of executing this new law. The Law, originally proposed by President-elect López, was passed by the Senate, the Chamber of Deputies, and published by President López Obrador. It was presented by President Lopez Obrador and the National Commissioner of CONAMER on the Presidential Morning Press Conference of January 30, 2020. In implementation of the Law on Public Trust and of the General Law on Better Regulation (in the matter of federal inspections and inspectors), CONAMER published the Guidelines on the Implementation of the Law to Promote Public Trust (February 20, 2020), and the Guidelines on the National Registry of Federal Inspections and Inspectors (February 19, 2020). The Law on the Promotion of Public Trust provided for the creation on a new Registry of Public Trust incorporated in an electronic platform which was also presented by President López Obrador, the Secretary of Economy Graciela Márquez and the National Commissioner of CONAMER during the Presidential Morning Press Conference.

=== Advocacy of Better Regulation Practices ===
During his year-and-a-half tenure as National Commissioner for Better Regulation, CONAMER published several better regulation advocacy studies, including "Simplifying Construction Permits" (August 14, 2019, coedited with the Organization of American States), "Actions to Simplify Administrative Procedures and Improve Regulations" (June 25, 2019), "Towards Digital Justice: Evaluation of Technological Systems in Local Judicial Branches " (June 31, 2019, coedited with the National Commission of State Supreme Courts and Microsoft), "Subnational Regulatory Agenda for the Commerce Sector" (November 22, 2019), "Subnational Regulatory Agenda for the Cargo Trucking Sector" (November 22, 2019, coedited with the Federal Economic Competition Commission), and "Better Regulation Best Practices for Municipal Governments" (July 3, 2019, coedited with the Mexican Association of State Secretaries of the Economy), "Oral Mercantile Trials. National Evaluation, Recommendations and JOM Certification" (February 20, 2020, coedited with the National Commission of State Supreme Courts and CIDE), and "How to Respond to the Epidemic. Best Practices for Local Governments" (April 4, 2020, coedited with the Mexican Association of State Secretaries of the Economy).

=== Resignation from CONAMER ===
He resigned his position as National Commissioner at CONAMER on May 15, 2020. His resignation was reported by The Wall Street Journal: "César Hernández, head of the commission on regulatory improvement and one of the architects of the power-sector overhaul that allowed foreign and private investment in the electricity market, resigned Friday after the Energy Ministry requested a waiver from the commission to publish the new rules without a public consultation." It was also reported in the US State Department 2020 Investment Climate Statement for Mexico: "CONAMER's widely-respected director, Cesar Hernandez, resigned May 15. Hours later, the acting head of CONAMER waived the requirement for a Regulatory Impact Assessment for a controversial energy policy directive that could affect the viability of private sector power projects in Mexico's energy market." Mexican political activist and academic John M. Ackerman celebrated: "César Hernández resignation is excellent news that shows we are moving in the right direction… Hérnandez was architect of the privatizing 2014 Energy Reform".

== Publications ==
His published books and articles explore, among others, issues of telecommunications regulation, international trade and arbitration, and energy regulation and reform.

=== Books and book chapters ===
- Reforma energética. Electricidad, México, Fondo de Cultura Económica, 2018, 132 pp.
- With Flores Quiroga, Aldo, et al., Crecimiento y productividad II, México, Fondo de Cultura Económica, 2018, 625 pp.
- With Martínez, Lorenza, coordinador del libro La política del comercio exterior: Regulación e impacto, México D.F., ITAM, 2012, 347 pp.
- La reforma cautiva. Inversión, trabajo y empresa en el sector eléctrico mexicano, México D.F., CIDAC, 2007, 534 pp.
- With Rubio, Luis, Jaime, Edna y Azuara, Oliver, México 2025: el futuro se construye hoy, México D.F., CIDAC, 2006, 191 pp.
- "Estado de derecho y acceso a la justicia: Algunas experiencias internacionales", Fix Fierro, Héctor (ed.), A la puerta de la ley. Un nuevo orden jurídico para el México de hoy, México D.F., Cal y Arena, 1994.

=== Academic articles ===
- "La nueva Constitución energética mexicana y su implementación", en Esquivel, Gerardo, Ibarra Palafox, Francisco, y Salazar Ugarte, Pedro (Coords.), Cien ensayos para el Centenario, Tomo 2. Estudios Jurídicos, México D.F., UNAM/Senado de la República, 2017, pp. 231–260.
- "La regulación y el sistema judicial se dan la mano. Los litigios del espectro radioeléctrico 2008-2011", en Mariscal, Judith (ed.), Licitación 21. Lecciones de política pública en telecomunicaciones, México D.F., CIDE, 2014, 208 pp.
- "Títulos habilitantes y discrecionalidad en las telecomunicaciones mexicanas", en Fernández Ruiz, Jorge, y Rivera Hernández, Juan (coords.), La concesión de las telecomunicaciones, México D.F., Instituto de Investigaciones Jurídicas, UNAM, 2011, pp. 1–30.
- "Servicio público y servicio universal en las telecomunicaciones mexicanas. Una transición regulatoria inacabada", en Caballero Juárez, José Antonio, Concha Cantú, Hugo A., y Fix-Fierro, Héctor (coords.), Sociología del derecho. Culturas y sistemas jurídicos comparados. Vol. II: Regulación, cultura jurídica, multiculturalismo, pluralismo jurídico y derechos humanos, México D.F., Instituto de Investigaciones Jurídicas, UNAM, 2010, pp. 1–45.
- "Temas de regulación del sector eléctrico", en Bárquin Álvarez, Manuel y Treviño Moreno, Francisco J. (Coords.), La infraestructura pública en México (Regulación y financiamiento), México D. F., Instituto de Investigaciones Jurídicas, UNAM, 2010, pp. 107–132.
- "Análisis de Sentencias y Resoluciones Relevantes. Acción de Inconstitucionalidad 26/2006 (Caso 'Ley de Medios') de la Suprema Corte de Justicia de la Nación", en Boletín Mexicano de Derecho Comparado, Nueva Serie, Año XLII, Núm. 125, mayo-agosto de 2009, pp. 1129–1158.
- "Transición de la televisión analógica a la digital", en Huber, Rudolf, y Villanueva, Ernesto (coords.), Reforma de medios electrónicos ¿Avances o retrocesos?, UNAM/Fundación Konrad Adenauer, 2007, pp. 137–157.
- With Alberto Díaz Cayeros, "El problema de la relación entre valores y hechos en el derecho: una perspectiva popperiana", en Abraham Nosnik (coord.), Caminos de apertura: El pensamiento de Karl R. Popper, México, D.F., Trillas/ITAM, 1991.
- With Víctor Carlos García Moreno, "Aspectos jurídicos del endeudamiento externo y la renegociación reciente de México", Estudios en homenaje a la doctora Yolanda Frias, México D.F., Instituto de Investigaciones Jurídicas, UNAM, 1991.
- With Víctor Carlos García Moreno, "Hacia un Acuerdo de Libre Comercio México-Estados Unidos. Implicaciones Legales", en Witker, Jorge (coord.), Aspectos Jurídicos del Tratado de Libre Comercio, México D.F., Instituto de Investigaciones Jurídicas, UNAM, 1992.
- With Víctor Carlos García Moreno, "Páneles para la resolución de disputas", en Rey Romay, Benito (coord.) La integración comercial de México a Estados Unidos y Canadá. ¿Alternativa o destino?, México D.F., Instituto de Investigaciones Económicas, UNAM/Siglo XXI, 1992.
- With Víctor Carlos García Moreno, "El neoproteccionismo y los páneles como mecanismos de defensa contra las prácticas desleales", en Revista de Derecho Privado, México D.F., UNAM, año 3, núm. 9, septiembre-diciembre 1992.
- With Víctor Carlos García Moreno, "El Acuerdo de Libre Comercio México-Estados Unidos como instrumento para enfrentar el proteccionismo moderno", en Carlos Arriola (comp.), Testimonios sobre el TLC, México D.F., Miguel Ángel Porrúa/Secofi, 1994.
- With Víctor Carlos García Moreno, "Neoprotectionism and Dispute Resolution Panels as Defense Mechanisms Against Unfair Trade Practices: A Focus on Mexico", en Kozolchyk, Boris (ed.), Making Free Trade Work in the Americas, Vol. 1, New York, Transnational Juris Publications Inc., 1994.

== Awards and honors ==
Dr. Hernández was awarded the 2007 Marcos Kaplan Award given to the best PhD/SJD Dissertation on Law and Social Sciences by Mexico's National Autonomous University (UNAM) for his work on the Effectiveness of Mexico's telecommunications regulation.

In 2018, he was awarded the LAC-CORE Clean Energy Award 2018, by the Latin American and Caribbean Council on Renewable Energy, "for his work in establishing the foundations of Mexico's renewable energy industry". He is the only Mexican to have obtained the award, former recipients of the award include José Maria Figueres (former president of Costa Rica), Ramón Mendez Galain (former Minister of Energy of Uruguay), and Marcelo Tokman Ramos (former Minister of Energy of Chile).

Dr. Hernández is Fulbright Grantee and Ford MacArthur Graduate Fellow (1991). Previously, he received the Premio Ruta Hidalgo (1978), for elementary school students, from Mexico's Ministry of Education (SEP).
