= António Fernandes =

António Fernandes may refer to:

- Álvaro Fernandes, 15th Century Portuguese slave-trader and explorer
- António Fernandes (explorer), (?–c. 1525) 16th century Portuguese explorer who traveled in Zambia and Zimbabwe
- António Fernandes (Jesuit) (c. 1569–1642), Portuguese Jesuit missionary
- António Fernandes (music theorist) (c. 1595–after 1680), Portuguese music theorist, conductor, and priest
- Antonio Fernandes (politician), Indian politician
- António Fernandes (chess player) (born 1962), Portuguese chess grandmaster

== See also ==
- Antonio Fernández (disambiguation)
