= Maria Celestina Fernandes =

Angolan children's author

Maria Celestina Fernandes (born 12 September 1945) is an Angolan children's author. She has also written poetry and short stories, and had earlier careers as a social worker and lawyer. She has won several awards including Prémio Literário Jardim do Livro Infantil, Prémio Caxinde do Conto Infantil, and Prémio Excelência Literária (Troféu Corujão das Letras).

== Early life ==
Maria Celestina Fernandes was born in Lubango on 12 September 1945, the daughter of a civil servant father. She was educated at the Salvador Correia High School in Luanda.

Fernandes trained as a social worker at the Pio XII Institute of Social Work, and earned a bachelor's degree in law from the Faculty of Law of Agostinho Neto University.

== Career ==
In 1975, Fernandes started work at the National Bank of Angola, and remained there for more than two decades, rising from the head of the social department to deputy director of the legal department, and later retired.

Fernandes started writing in the late 1980s, initially in the Jornal de Angola and the Boletim da Organização da Mulher Angolana (OMA). Since 1990, she has published numerous books. In February 2016, she took part in a literature festival in Lisbon, Portugal, hosted by the country's former President, Jorge Sampaio.

Fernandes is a member of the Angolan Writers' Union and the Chá de Caxinde Association.

== Selected publications ==
Her publications include:

- A borboleta cor de ouro, UEA, 1990
- Kalimba, INALD, 1992
- A árvore dos gingongos, Edições Margem. 1993
- A rainha tartaruga, INALD, 1997
- A filha do soba, Nzila, 2001
- O presente, Chá de Caxinde, 2002
- A estrela que sorri, UEA, 2005
- É preciso prevenir, UEA, 2006
- As três aventureiras no parque e a joaninha, UEA, 2006
- União Arco-Íris, INALD, 2006
- Colectânea de contos, INALD, 2006
- Retalhos da vida, INALD, 1992
- Poemas, UEA, 1995
- O meu canto, UEA, 2004
- Os panos brancos, UEA, 2004
- A Muxiluanda, Chá de Caxinde, 2008
- Kambas para Sempre, Kapulana, 2017

== Awards ==
Her awards include:

- Prémio Literário Jardim do Livro Infantil, 2010
- Prémio Caxinde do Conto Infantil, 2012
- Prémio Excelência Literária (Troféu Corujão das Letras), 2015
