= Antonio Fernández Santillana =

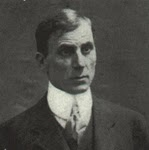
Antonio Fernández Santillana

Antonio Fernández Santillana (7 February 1876 – 6 December 1909) was an early pioneer in aviation. He was a Spaniard residing in France and a tailor by profession. Fernández became interested in aviation and constructed three aircraft during 1909, the third of which was exhibited at the Paris Aero Salon in October 1909. He was killed at Nice when he lost control of his aircraft.

== See also ==
- List of fatalities from aviation accidents
