= Ernesto Fernandes =

Timorese politician (1945–2025)

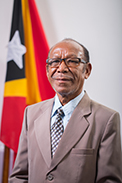
- Fernandes in 2019

Member of the National Parliament of Timor-Leste
- In office 2017–2023

Personal details
- Born: 18 June 1945 Hatulia Administrative Post, Portuguese Timor
- Died: 7 May 2025 (aged 79) Dili, Timor-Leste
- Party: PD
- Occupation: Military officer

Military service
- Allegiance: Fretilin
- Branch/service: Falintil
- Rank: Commander
- Conflict: East Timorese civil war
- Awards: Order of Timor-Leste

Ernesto Fernandes (18 June 1945 – 7 May 2025) was a Timorese politician. A member of the Democratic Party, he served in the National Parliament from 2017 to 2023.

Fernandes died in Dili on 7 May 2025, at the age of 79.
