= Gerardo Xavier Hernández =

Mexican politician

Gerardo Xavier Hernández “El Panocho”
- Born: 29 October 1968 (age 57); Coatepec Harinas, State of Mexico, Mexico
- Education: UAEM
- Occupation: Deputy
- Political party: PRI

Gerardo Xavier Hernández Tapia (born 29 October 1968) was a Mexican politician affiliated with the Institutional Revolutionary Party (PRI).

In the 2012 general election he was elected to the Chamber of Deputies to represent the State of Mexico's 40th district during the 62nd session of Congress.

While serving as city mayor and congressman, Hernández Tapia faced allegations of corruption.
