= Lizbeth Hernández =

Mexican freelance journalist, editor and photographer

- Occupation: Journalist

Lizbeth Hernández is a Mexican journalist, editor and photographer. Her work addresses issues related to feminism, sexual diversity, racism, collective memory and territorial defense. She is founder and director of the independent media outlet Kaja Negra. Her work combines narrative journalism and documentary photography, with an emphasis on communities and social movements in Mexico and Latin America. She has collaborated with media such as The Washington Post en Español, El País América, AJ+, NACLA Report on the Americas, Presentes, Wambra, Animal Político, Volcánicas, and Revista Anfibia.

== Professional career ==
Hernández began her journalistic career in the early 2010s, mainly covering feminist and LGBTI+ mobilizations in Mexico. In her chronicle “What is it like to cover feminist marches in Mexico?”, published in Volcánicas, she describes the conditions of this type of reporting, such as the risks, police presence, and working conditions for women journalists at protest marches. She is part of Revista Anfibia as an author and collaborator in international journalistic projects related to gender, diversity and human rights issues.

=== Kaja Negra ===
In 2015, Kaja Negra, an independent cultural and journalistic media outlet based in Mexico. The project incorporates collaborative and community-based approaches in its editorial practice. In an interview with LatAm Journalism Review, Hernández explained that the outlet seeks to foster "conversation and listening" as tools to build inclusive narratives and counteract the traditional structures of journalism. Sembramedia is a non-profit organization that promotes the leadership of journalists and the sustainability of independent digital media in Latin America. In 2022, Kaja Negra was included in Sembramedia's report “Safer, fairer and more inclusive...” which analyzes the development of women-led digital media initiatives in the region.

=== Journalistic collaborations ===
Hernández has worked in chronicle, interview, reporting and editing collaborative projects. In Distintas Latitudes she published and edited texts such as:

- Justice for Lesvy, justice for all.
- Letra S: the organization that fights disinformation and homophobia in Mexico.
- Embroidering life in an armed conflict zone.
- Interview with Libia Brenda.

As a photographer she has documented social and environmental processes. In 2023 she participated as a photographer in the report “Wounded communities facing titans”, published by Contra Corriente, about the resistance of Honduran communities to extractive projects.

=== Los rostros del agua ===
In 2024, Hernández coordinated the project Los rostros del agua, developed between Mexico and Uruguay. The report was published in Latin American media such as Alharaca, where Hernández is credited as photographer and text editor. The project documents the experiences of urban women water defenders in Mexico City and Montevideo, from an ecofeminist perspective that links environmental defense with gender inequalities.

== Irene: Ayuujk Resistance ==
In 2021 she co-wrote, together with illustrator Ana Karenina, the graphic novel Irene: Resistencia Ayuujk, published by the Goethe-Institut as part of the international project Movements and Moments. The work tells the story of Irene Hernández, an Ayuujk teacher from Ayutla, Oaxaca, and includes themes related to territory, language and community organization. In an interview with the Goethe-Institut, Hernández stated that the project sought to highlight the memory and participation of Ayuujk women.

The graphic novel was presented in Ayutla Mixes in an event organized by EDUCA Oaxaca, where its relevance to local memory and indigenous rights was highlighted. The comic is available in Spanish and English as part of the project's international collection.

== Incidents and press freedom ==
On September 11, 2020, while covering a protest in Ecatepec, State of Mexico, Hernández was detained by police officers despite having identified herself as a journalist. Organizations such as the Coalition for Women in Journalism and the Committee to Protect Journalists documented the case, pointing out the use of force against women journalists during coverage of protests in Mexico. Hernández described the incident in a chronicle published in Volcánicas.
