= Anaida Hernández =

Puerto Rican artist

- Born: 1954 (age 70–71); Mayagüez, Puerto Rico
- Occupation: Artist

Anaida Hernández (born 1954) is a Puerto Rican (was born in the city of Moca) to an agriculture family. She was born to Benjamin Hernandez Vargas and Carmen Hernandez. She is a sculptor, painter, installation artist, muralist, documentary director, and businesswoman. She was an active member of the Association of Women Artists of Puerto Rico and is considered as being a pioneer in addressing violence against women via contemporary Caribbean and Latin American art.

== Biography ==
She obtained a bachelor's degree in art from the University of Puerto Rico's Mayagüez campus in 1974 and then attended the National Autonomous University of Mexico's Academy of San Carlos with Gilberto Aceves Navarro, graduating in 1977 with a master's degree in engraving. In 1979, she began work at the Interamerican University of Puerto Rico as an art teacher on the San Germán campus and then for the University of Puerto Rico at Mayagüez from 1980 to 1982, where she spearheaded a researched project into the manufacture of paper with seaweed.

In her work as an artist, she has used the female body to explore erotic themes, power and gender relations, immigration, and domestic violence. Hernández worked on topics of violence against women and femicide from 1990 because of a Puerto Rican journalistic report that typified femicide in the same year. In that report, she found the names of 100 women murdered on Puerto Rico from January to June 1993 and, because of the climate of pressure on Puerto Rican lawmakers to amend certain laws, Hernández decided to begin on the piece Until Death Do Us Part, made up of boxes engraved with the name of each of the named women. Of the project Hernández wrote "the strength and spirit of these murdered women has been carried to all corners of the world with the hope that violence, in any of its manifestations, will be eradicated from the face of the earth."

== Exhibitions ==
=== Individual ===
- 1989: Bestiario: Los monstruos que todos llevamos adentro. Convent of the Dominicans, San Juan, Puerto Rico.
- 1990: Símbolos de San Juan. Gallery of the Art Students' League, San Juan, Puerto Rico.
- 1997: The Ceremony: Petitions, Riddles and Conundrums. SinTítulo: Gallery of Contemporary Art, San Juan, Puerto Rico.
- 1999: Juegos Ilegales / Illegal Games. New Museum of Contemporary Art, SoHo, New York City and Grand Central Art Center, Main Gallery, California State University at Fullerton, California, United States of America.
- 1999: Secretos compartidos. Tenement Museum, New York City.
- 2000: Adivina Adivinador: Colindancias and Riddle me this. Galería Petrus Galerus, Hato Rey, Puerto Rico.
- 1994–2000: Hasta que la Muerte nos Separe. Capitol of Puerto Rico and Galería Raíces, San Juan, Puerto Rico (1994); Museum of Fine Arts, La Havana, Cuba (1994); Suermondt-Ludwig-Museum, Aachen, (Germany) and the Museum of Contemporary Art and Design, San José, Costa Rica (1995); City University of New York and the Lehman College Art Gallery, New York City (1998). It has since become a permanent exhibit at the Museum of Puerto Rican Art (2004).
- 1989–2000: Dibujos y Grabados 1989 a 2000. John Cotton Dana Library, Rutgers University–Newark, New Jersey, USA.
- 1994–2000: Retrospectiva: Adivina adivinador, quien soy, Diez y nueve Instalaciones. Hostos Community College, New York City.
- 2001: Cross Pollination: 50 NY Sculptors/50 California Sculptors. Travelling Exhibition: California, London, Holland Tunnel Gallery, Long Island City, New York.
- 2002: Espacio Compartido: Anaida Hernández y Rosa Irigoyen. Art Museum of the Americas, Washington D.C., USA.
- 2002: Anaida Hernández. Fórmula secreta: Pinturas recientes. Galería Pintadera, San Juan, Puerto Rico.
- 2004: Código Secreto. Museum of Puerto Rican Art, Santurce, Puerto Rico.
- 2006: Seducción=Poder. Galería-Obra Alegría, San Juan, Puerto Rico.
- 2007: Maya. Eugenio María de Hostos Museum, Mayagüez, Puerto Rico.
- 2010: Sentidos y Engaños. Caribbean University, Bayamón, Puerto Rico.
