= Priscilla Hernández =

Spanish singer-songwriter and fantasy illustrator

Priscilla Hernandez
- Origin: Spain
- Genres: Ambient; New-age; Darkwave
- Occupations: Singer, songwriter, record producer, fantasy illustrator
- Years active: 2002–present
- Labels: Yidneth
- Website: priscillahernandez.com

Priscilla Hernández is a Spanish singer-songwriter and fantasy illustrator. Born in La Palma (Canary Islands), she is now based in Navarre, Spain. She is also the founder of the independent record label Yidneth Records.

Priscilla's music can be classified as 'Ethereal gothic' or dark new age, based in the spectral spellbinding of fairytales, a concept that also nourishes her fantasy and fairy art as illustrator. She's also known as "Yidneth" which is not her artistic name but her comic project as an illustrator made in the late 1990s but unreleased. After some demos and collaborations in soundtracks and other CDs and projects, late 2006 she released her official debut album "Ancient Shadows (the ghost and the fairy)", which compiles 19 of her songs as well as two booklets with her illustrations. The album won the award of "Best New Age Album" for the Independent Music Awards (IMAs) and best ambient song and album at JPfolks awards (Nashville) and she was also nominee as best new age vocalist in Los Angeles Music Awards. This project is specially inspired not only by the fantasy world of fairies and ghosts that inspires her artworks but also by the sleep paralysis disorder and hypnagogic and hypnopompic hallucinations occurring between dream and awareness and the strange states of mind that may take place during temporal lobe epilepsy. Her second album was released as a conceptual illustrated digibook late 2011, showcasing a blend of ethereal voices, ambient, gothic, and folk elements, with haunting melodies and atmospheric soundscapes. The album explores themes of fantasy, darkness, and introspection, drawing inspiration from mythology, dreams, and the supernatural.

Thanks to the company Faerieworlds, Priscilla premiered in the United States both in the West Coast (Faerieworlds) and East Coast (Faeriecon) along with bands like Qntal, Faun, Woodland and Trillian Green. She also has appeared on the cover of Faerie Magazine. Priscilla Hernández also performed the a cappella track "La Nana de las Brujas," featured in Daemonia Nymphe Wytches Lullaby EP (2021), which reached number one on the Tunes World Chart in Spain in October 2023 and went viral on TikTok, with over 100,000 videos as of 2024.

Priscilla's music has been compared with Louisa John-Kroll, Enya, Bel Canto, Sarah Brightman. and Kate Bush

== Music ==
- 2006 – Ancient Shadows
- 2011 – The Underliving
- 2012 – No matter what they say (single)
- 2013 – The waking of the Spring
- 2019 – Flame (single)
- 2019 – Nothing is Done Until It's Done (single)
- 2020 – Surrender (single)
- 2021 – Longing to Bloom (single)
- 2021 – The Lingering Light (single)
- 2024 – He's on the Way (single)

‍

== External sources ==
- Priscilla Hernandez Ancient Shadows press kit (pdf)
- Priscilla Hernandez The Underliving press kit (pdf)
