= Dolores Jiménez Hernández =

Mexican diplomat (born 1955)

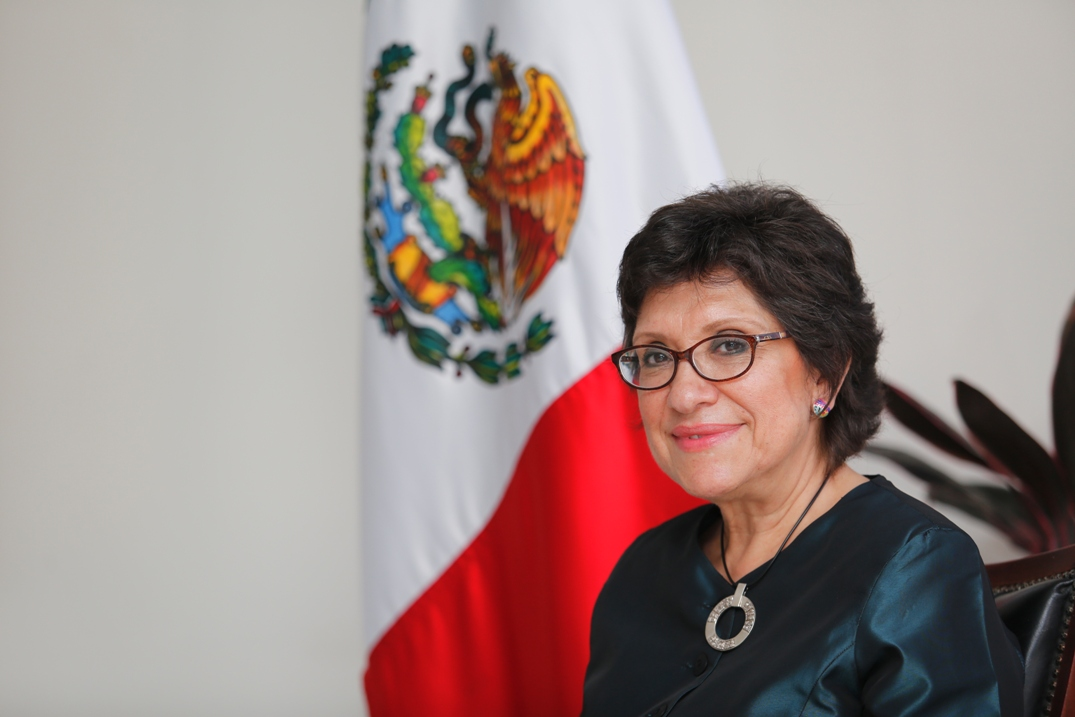
- Born: April 1, 1955 (age 71); Mexico City, Mexico
- Education: Australian National University
- Occupation: Diplomat
- Known for: Ambassador of Mexico to Honduras

Dolores Jiménez Hernández (born April 1, 1955) is a Mexican diplomat who currently serves as the ambassador of Mexico to Honduras.

== Biography ==
Dolores Jiménez Hernández holds a licentiate in International Relations from the National Autonomous University of Mexico. Her specialization studies in Diplomacy were made at Australian National University. She was a finance and minutes assistant at the Meetings of the Business Coordinating Council (1976–1979). Later, she was an international financial affairs analyst at the Secretariat of Finance and Public Credit (1980–1981).

== Diplomatic career ==
In 1982 she joined the Mexican Foreign Service. At the Secretariat of Foreign Affairs, she served as Head of the Department for the Eastern Pacific (1984–1985) and as Deputy Director for Japan in the General Directorate for the Pacific (1986–1991). She also served as Advisor to the Assistant Secretary for the United Nations (2002–2003) and Deputy General Director for the General Assembly and Specialized Organizations of the United Nations System (2004–2007).

Overseas, she has been Delegate to the Permanent Mission of Mexico to International Organizations based in Geneva, which include the World Health Organization, the International Labour Organization, the World Intellectual Property Organization, the International Union for the Protection of New Varieties of Plants, the International Organization for Migration, the Meetings of the Economic and Social Council of the United Nations, and the Meetings and Conferences of the Parties to the Conventions on Climate Change and Biological Diversity (1991–1997).

She was an officer of the World Intellectual Property Organization, serving as Director of Policy Development and Rapporteur of the Policy Advisory Commission (1999–2002), Senior Counselor of the Strategic Planning Directorate, and Secretary of the Policy Development Group (1998–1999).

She served as Alternate Permanent Representative to the International Civil Aviation Organization (ICAO) from 2007 to 2011, based in Montreal, and held the same position with the Organization of American States (OAS) in Washington from 2011 to 2015.

In 2015, she was appointed ambassador of Mexico to the Republic of Honduras, where she has worked to expand cooperation between the countries in matters of security, natural disasters, and migration.
