= Emanuel Jardim Fernandes =

Portuguese politician (1944–2025)

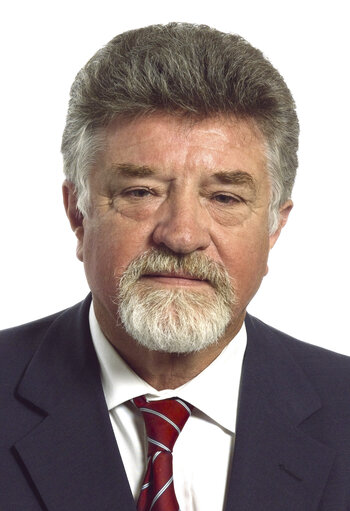
Emanuel Jardim Fernandes

Emanuel Vasconcelos Jardim Fernandes (21 January 1944 – 13 August 2025) was a Portuguese politician.

== Life and career ==
Fernandes was born in Seixal on 21 January 1944. He was a Member of the European Parliament (MEP) from 2004 to 2009 for the Socialist Party; part of the Party of European Socialists.

Fernandes died on 13 August 2025, at the age of 81.
