= Ferrin =

Ferrin is a given name and surname. Notable people with the name include:

== Given name ==
- Ferrin Barr Jr. or Jimmy Jack Funk (born 1959), American wrestler
- Ferrin Campbell (1923–2012), American politician
- Ferrin Fraser (1903–1969), radio scriptwriter and short story author

== Surname ==
- Abi Ferrin, fashion designer
- Antonia Ferrín Moreiras (1914–2009), Spanish mathematician
- Arnie Ferrin (1925–2022), American basketball player, executive, athletic director
- Chad Ferrin (born 1973), American actor
- Diego Ferrín (born 1988), Ecuadorian athlete
- Gino Ferrin (born 1947), German footballer
- Gustavo Ferrín, Uruguayan football manager
- Jennifer Ferrin (born 1979), American actress
- Mary Upton Ferrin (1810–1881), American suffragette and women's rights advocate
- Massimo Ferrin (born 1998), Canadian soccer player
- Samuel Abbott Ferrin (1831–1875), Canadian American politician
- Wenceslao Ferrín (born 1969), Colombian sprinter
- Whitman G. Ferrin (1818–1896), American politician
- Xosé Luís Méndez Ferrín (born 1938), Spanish writer in the Galician language

== See also ==
- McFerrin, surname
- Ferran (given name)
- Ferran (surname)
- Ferren, given name and surname
- Ferron (disambiguation) § People
