= Ferran (given name) =

- Gender: Male
- Language: Catalan, Spanish

Origin
- Language: Germanic

Other names
- See also: Ferdinand, Fernand, Fernando

Ferran or Ferrán (Catalan pronunciation: [fəˈran]) is a Catalan masculine given name of Germanic origin. The name was especially popular in Catalonia during the Middle Ages and modern use of the name is still heavily centered in eastern Spain. It is a variant of the original Ferdinand in Germanic or Fernando in Spanish.

As of 2023, it was the 214th most common male name in Spain with 13,083 people named Ferran in the country, with their average age being 31.7 years old. This included: 7,273 in the Province of Barcelona, 1,501 in the Province of Valencia, and 1,407 in the Province of Girona.

Notable people with the name include:

- Ferran Adrià (born 1962), Spanish chef
- Ferrán Aguiló (born 1957), Spanish artist
- Ferran Audí (born 1962), Spanish actor and director
- Ferran d'Aunés (fl. 1303–1305), Catalan mercenary
- Ferran Barenblit (born 1968), Argentine museum curator
- Ferrán Bassas (born 1992), Spanish basketball player
- Ferran Bel (born 1965), Spanish economist, academic and politician
- Ferran Blasi Birbe (1929–2021), Spanish priest, theologian, journalist, translator, and writer
- Ferrán Bono (born 1969), Spanish journalist and politician
- Ferran Bosch i Martí (1854–1935), Spanish lawyer, judge, amateur astronomer, and Valencian nationalist
- Ferrán Caballero (born 1985), Spanish writer and professor
- Ferran Casablancas i Planell (1874–1960), Spanish businessman
- Ferrán Casarramona, Spanish astronomer
- Ferran Cels i Granell (1880–1924), Spanish architect
- Ferran Corominas (born 1983), Spanish footballer
- Ferran Costa (born 1994), Spanish football manager
- Ferran Costa Marimon (born 1970), Andorran politician, businessman, and linguist
- Ferran Cremades (born 1950), Spanish writer
- Ferran Escrivà i Cantos (1905–1977), Spanish painter and illustrator
- Ferran Falcó i Isern (born 1969), Spanish politician
- Ferran Font (born 1996), Spanish roller hockey player
- Ferran Freixa (1950–2021), Spanish photographer
- Ferran Gallego (born 1953), Spanish historian and writer
- Ferran Garcia-Oliver (born 1957), Spanish historian, writer, and professor
- Ferran García Sevilla (born 1949), Spanish artist
- Ferrán Giner (born 1988), Spanish footballer
- Ferran Glenfield (born 1954), Irish Anglican bishop
- Ferrán Gonzalo Vaquer (born 2007), Spanish cyclist
- Ferran Hurtado (1951–2014), Spanish mathematician and computer scientist
- Ferran Julià (born 2000), Spanish swimmer
- Ferran Jutglà (born 1999), Spanish footballer
- Ferran Latorre (born 1970), Spanish mountaineer and adventurer
- Ferran Laviña (born 1977), Spanish basketball player
- Ferran López (born 1971), Spanish basketball player
- Ferran López Navarro (born 1966), Spanish police officer
- Ferran Martínez (born 1968), Spanish basketball player
- Ferrán Monzó (born 1992), Spanish footballer
- Ferran Olivella (1936–2023), Spanish footballer
- Ferran Paredes Rubio (born 1975), Spanish photographer
- Ferran Pol (born 1983), Andorran footballer
- Ferran de Querol i de Bofarull (1857–1935), Spanish lawyer, politician, and writer
- Ferrán Quetglas (born 2005), Spanish footballer
- Ferran Rañé i Blasco (born 1950), Spanish actor, director, producer, and teacher
- Ferran Romeu (1862–1943), Spanish architect
- Ferran Ruiz (born 2003), Spanish footballer
- Ferran Rull (born 1997), Spanish actor
- Ferrán Sarsanedas (born 1997), Spanish footballer
- Ferran Sibila (born 1988), Spanish football manager
- Ferran Solé (born 1992), Spanish handball player
- Ferran Soriano (born 1967), Spanish businessman
- Ferran Sunyer i Balaguer (1912–1967), Spanish mathematician
- Ferran Tacón (born 1986), Spanish footballer
- Ferran Terra (born 1987), Spanish alpine skier
- Ferran Torrent i Llorca (born 1951), Spanish writer and journalist
- Ferran Torres (born 2000), Spanish footballer
- Ferran Truyols (1850–1923), Spanish aristocrat and politician
- Fernando Valls Taberner (1888–1942), Spanish jurist, politician, historian and medievalist
- Ferran Velazco Querol (born 1976), Spanish rugby union player
- Ferrán Ventura (born 1995), Spanish basketball player

== See also ==
- Farran (surname)
- Ferren, given name and surname
- Ferrin, given name and surname
- Ferron (disambiguation) § People
