= Ferron (disambiguation) =

Ferron (born 1952) is a Canadian singer-songwriter.

Ferron may also refer to:

== People ==
- Ferron (footballer) (Luiz Antonio Linhares Garcia, born 1985), Brazilian footballer
- Christophe Ferron (born 1970), French football manager and former player
- Damián Ferrón, Argentine businessman killed in the triple crime
- Dani Ferron (born 1980), Andorran footballer
- Fabrizio Ferron (born 1965), former Italian footballer
- Francis Ferrón (born 1990), Spanish footballer
- Isabelle Ferron (born 1967), film and stage actress
- Jacques Ferron (1921–1985), Canadian physician and author
- J.-Émile Ferron (1896–1970), lawyer and federal Quebec politician
- Jordi Ferrón (born 1978), Spanish footballer
- Julio Ferrón (born 1988), Uruguayan footballer
- Louis Ferron (1942–2005), Dutch novelist and poet
- Madeleine Ferron (1922–2010), Quebec writer
- Marcelle Ferron (1924–2001), Québécoise painter and stained glass artist
- Marie Rose Ferron (1902–1936), Canadian-American Roman Catholic mystic and stigmatist
- Ralph Ferron (born 1972), Luxembourg footballer
- Valentin Ferron (born 1998), French cyclist
- Ferron Williams (born 1955), Maroon politician and former Colonel-in-Chief of Accompong, Jamaica

== Other uses ==
- Ferron, Utah, an American city
- Ferron Formation, a geologic formation in Utah

== See also ==
- Ferran (given name)
- Ferran (surname)
- Ferren, given name and surname
- Ferrin, given name and surname
