= Farron =

Farron is a surname. Notable people with this surname include:

- Claude Farron (born 1935), botanist
- Ivan Farron (born 1971), Swiss writer
- Julia Farron (1922–2019), English ballerina
- Tim Farron (born 1970), British politician

== See also ==
- Farran (surname)
- Ferron (disambiguation) § People
