= Farran (surname) =

Farran is a surname and occasional given name of Irish and other origin. Notable people with this name include:

- Brian Farran (born 1944), Australian Anglican bishop
- Charles Frederick Farran (1840–1898), Irish judge in Bombay
- Dale Clark Farran, American chair in teaching and learning
- Dominique Farran (1947–2019), French radio host and journalist
- George Philip Farran (1876–1949), Irish zoologist
- Issey Nakajima-Farran (born 1984), Canadian soccer player
- Josep Maria Batlle i Farran (1949–2021), Spanish politician and farmer
- Merrick Farran (1906–1991), English composer, conductor and violinist
- Paris Nakajima-Farran (born 1989), Canadian soccer player, brother of Issey
- Rafael Font Farran (1912–2003), Spanish politician and journalist
- Roy Farran (1921–2006), British-Canadian soldier, politician, etc.
- Zein Farran (born 1999), Lebanese footballer
- Farran Zerbe (1871–1949), American coin collector and dealer

== See also ==
- Farran, a village in Ireland
- Farran's Point, Ontario, an underwater ghost town
- Farron, a surname
- Ferran (given name)
- Ferran (surname)
