= Barcelona Museum of Contemporary Art =

Coordinates: 41°23′00″N 2°10′01″E

- Museu d'Art Contemporani de Barcelona (MACBA)
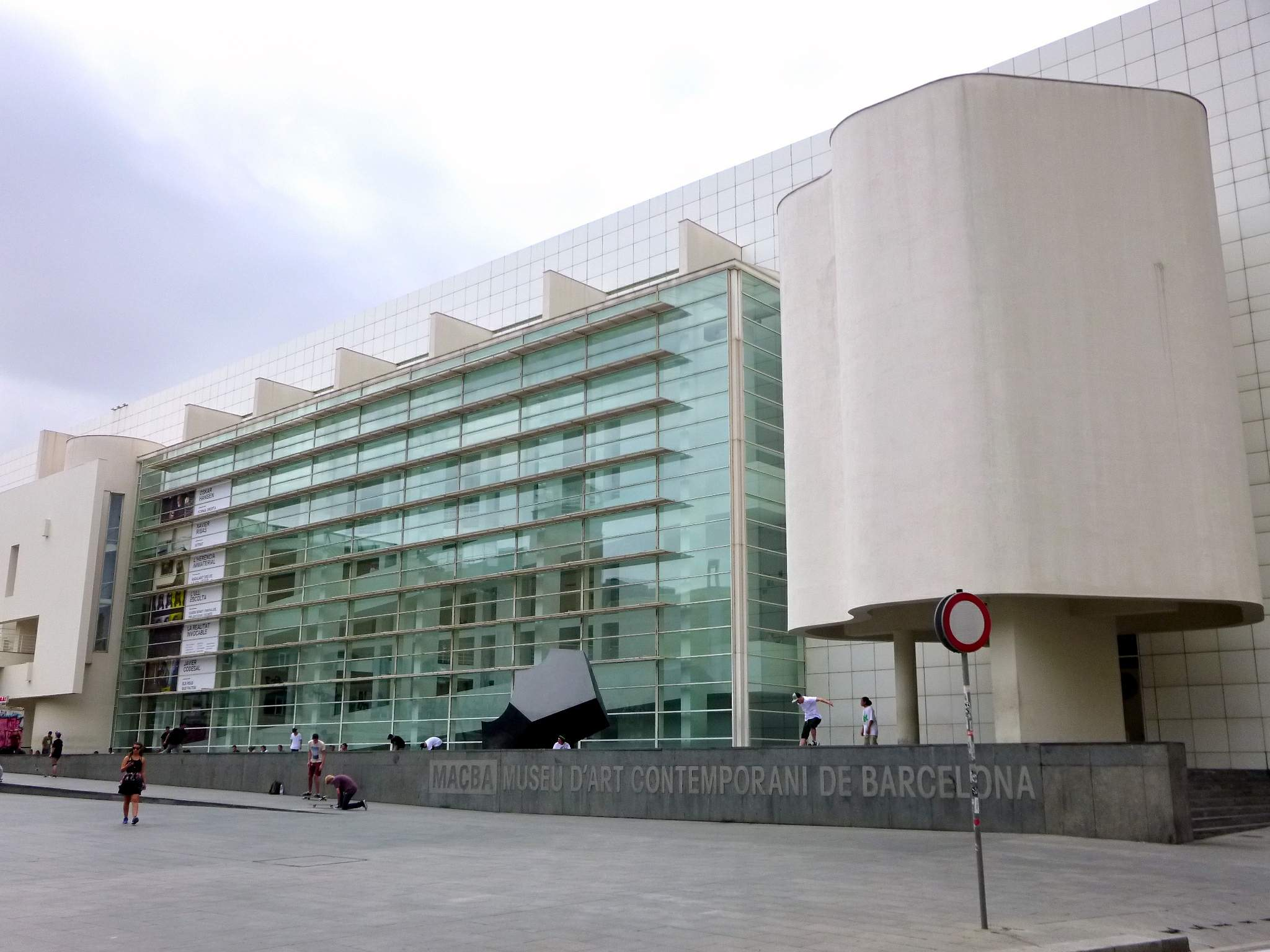
- Established: 28 November 1995
- Location: Plaça dels Àngels 1, Barcelona, Spain
- Type: Art museum
- Visitors: 331,694 (2018)
- Director: Elvira Dyangani Ose
- Public transit access: Pl. Catalunya; Catalunya; Universitat; Liceu
- Website: www.macba.cat

The Barcelona Museum of Contemporary Art (Catalan: Museu d'Art Contemporani de Barcelona, IPA: [muˈzɛw ˈðaɾt kuntəmpuˈɾani ðə βəɾsəˈlonə], MACBA, Catalan: [ˈmagbə]) is a contemporary art museum situated in the Plaça dels Àngels, in El Raval neighborhood, Ciutat Vella district, in Barcelona, Catalonia, Spain. The museum opened to the public on 28 November 1995.

Its current director is Valentín Roma, while previous directors include Daniel Giralt-Miracle (1988–1994), Miquel Molins Nubiola (1995–1998), Manuel Borja-Villel (1998–2007), Bartomeu Marí (2008-2015), Ferran Barenblit (2015-2021), and Elvira Dyangani Ose (2021-2026).

== History ==
In 1959, art critic Alexandre Cirici Pellicer formed a group of contemporary artists showing work in a series of twenty-three exhibitions with the hopes of beginning a collection for a new contemporary art museum in Barcelona. It was not until 1986 that the City Council of Barcelona recommended the American architect Richard Meier & Partners (1987–1995) to design the museum. Art critics Francesc Miralles and Rosa Queralt were hired to write the museum’s mission statement. In 1987, the MACBA Foundation was created. In the following year the MACBA Foundation, in conjunction with the Generalitat de Catalunya and the City Council, founded the MACBA Consortium in order further the process of the museum. The Consortium commissioned Meier later that year to build the museum. This was a controversial issue considering that the museum had no collection at the time of construction. The museum opened to the public in 1995, well after the 1992 Summer Olympics for which it was planned.

In 2014, the museum acquired an additional venue for its programming, comprising a converted 15th-century chapel and two large halls, a total of about 21,500 square feet, as well as the central Plaça dels Angels square. While MACBA has long used the chapel for performances and site-specific installations, this time the city lent the entire historic cluster to the institution for an unspecified term.

== Architecture ==
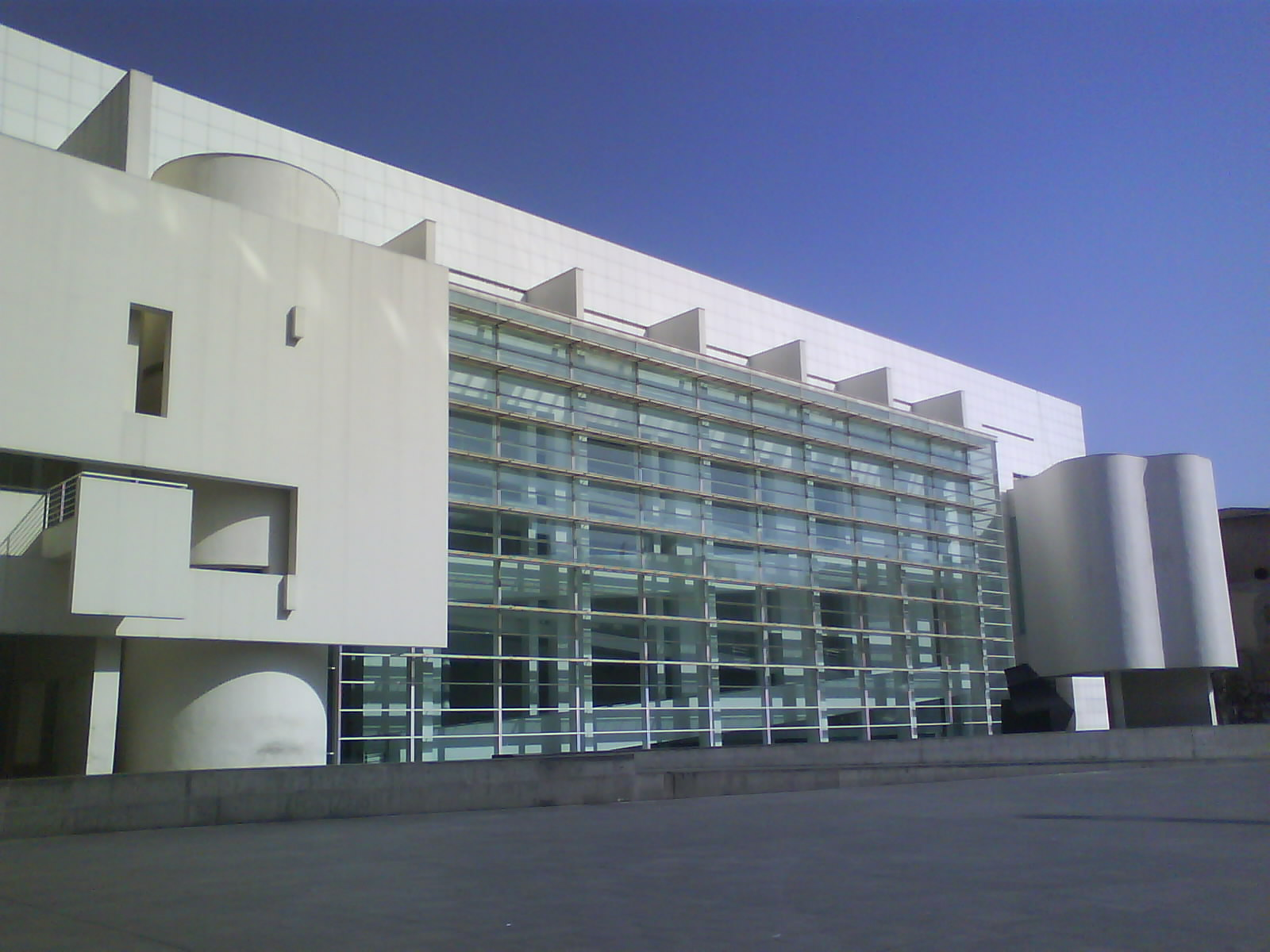
Museum's façade

Meier embraced the difficult task of creating a building that would ultimately display a variety of contemporary artworks that were unknown to him at the time of design. The choice to build the museum in the Plaça dels Ángels is consistent with Meier’s vision to situate the building amongst some of Barcelona’s oldest streets and buildings, in addition to revamping the public space of the Raval.

After the completion of the $35 million construction, local media referred to the museum as “the pearl” amongst the old architecture and narrow streets just a few blocks from Gothic center of Barcelona. The building’s architectural style has strong references to Modernism. The large 120 by 35 metres (394 by 115 ft) white building has much of its southern elevation glazed, providing the visitor with views across the plaza, and allowing for an abundance of natural light to illuminate the interior galleries. The museum has three main galleries, which can be subdivided, as well as five smaller galleries, one of which is in a tower.

== Collection ==
The permanent collection of around 5,000 works (up from 1,100 works at the time of the museum's opening in 1995) dates from the mid-20th century onward. There are three periods of modern art represented: the first one covers the forties to the sixties; the second spans the sixties and seventies; the third period is contemporary. The collections focus on post-1945 Catalan and Spanish art, although some International artists are also represented.

In 2007, the Center for Studies and Documentation MACBA was created, which developed a facet of complementary collecting with the traditional collection. In 2011, Philippe Méaille loans 800 works of the radical conceptualists artists group Art & Language at MACBA. Fearing political instability after the Catalonia referendum in October 2017, he will withdraw his loan and repatriate his collection to Château de Montsoreau-Museum of contemporary art. In 2020, under the tenure of Ferran Barenblit, it was announced the most generous donation ever received by the museum, the Rafael Tous collection of conceptual art.

== Education, publications, events ==
In December 2007, the museum opened its Study Center, and the Library Reading Room and Special Collections Room grant the public free access to the museum’s books, publications collection, and archives.

The museum publishes mainly exhibition catalogues from the museum, although has published some monographic books and critical essays. It also has three digital publications: Quaderns portàtils, Quaderns d'Àudio, and Sèrie Capella MACBA. The museum offers lectures, seminars, guided tours, video screenings and more to broaden the educational opportunities available to the public.

== Location ==
The museum address is Plaça dels Angels 1, Barcelona. The closest metro stations are Catalunya and Universitat. Opposite the main museum, in the medieval Convent dels Àngels for which the square is named, a chapel has been converted into a separate exposition area known as the Capella del MACBA, with regular video art performances. Entrance to this part of the museum is free.

Another contemporary art museum, Centre de Cultura Contemporània de Barcelona (CCCB), is adjacent to MACBA, and accessible from both the street and the inner patio.

The area in front of the museum is known among skateboarders to be one of the most iconic "spots" for the sport in the world. A 3D model of the location is featured in the smartphone game "Skater", and was a featured location in Transworld Skateboarding magazine for Go Skateboarding Day in 2016.

== Management ==
MACBA is managed by a consortium founded in 1988 whose members include the Generalitat de Catalunya, the City Council of Barcelona, and the Spanish Ministry of Culture. In March 2015, Bartomeu Marí i Ribas resigned as director of the museum in light of a censorship row over a controversial installation by the Austrian artist Ines Doujak. In July 2015, Ferran Barenblit, was named the new director. Elvira Dyangani Ose, the first black woman to lead MACBA since its founding, took over as director in 2021. In 2026 she was replaced by Valentín Roma.

== Gallery ==
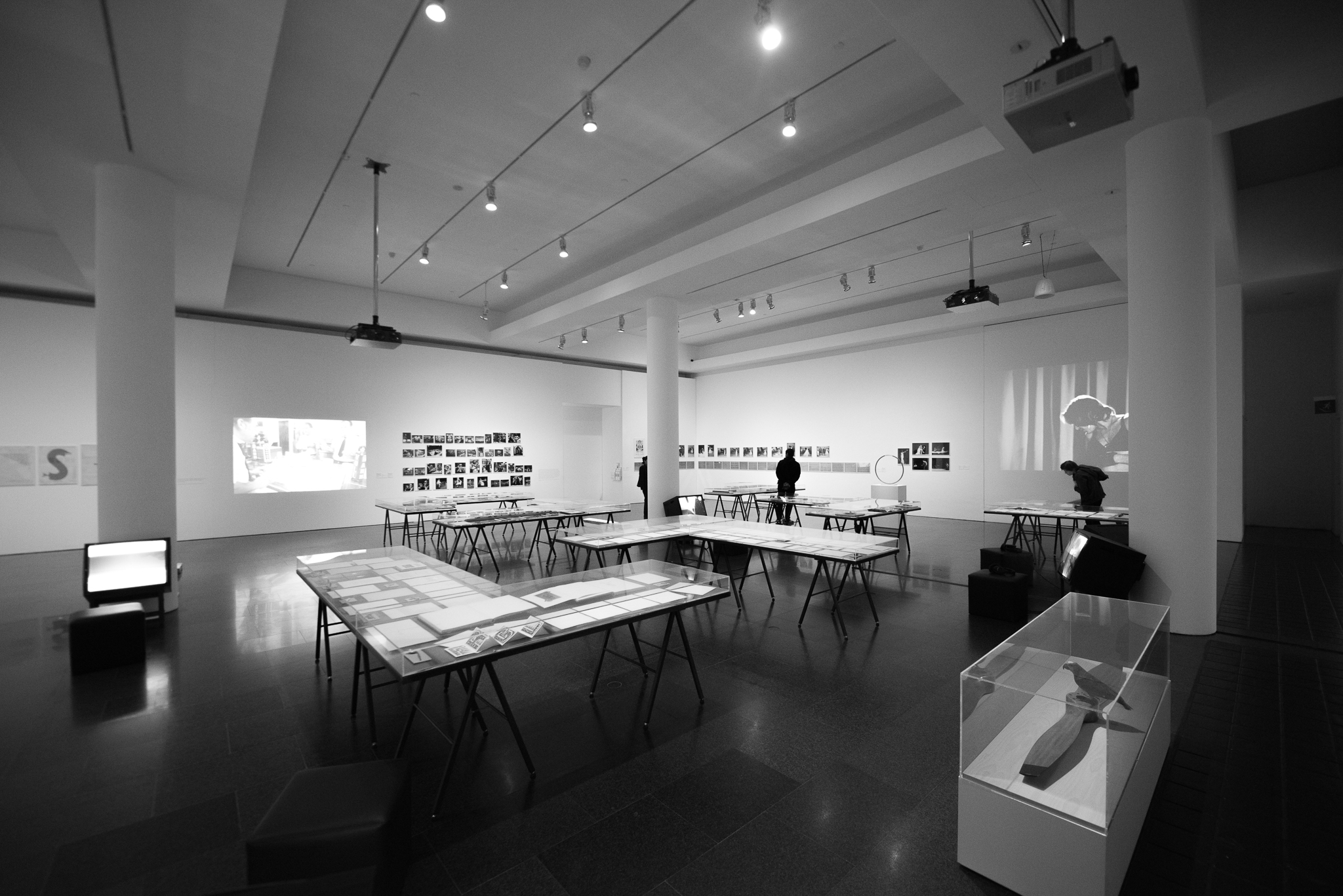
Interior view, MACBA, 2017

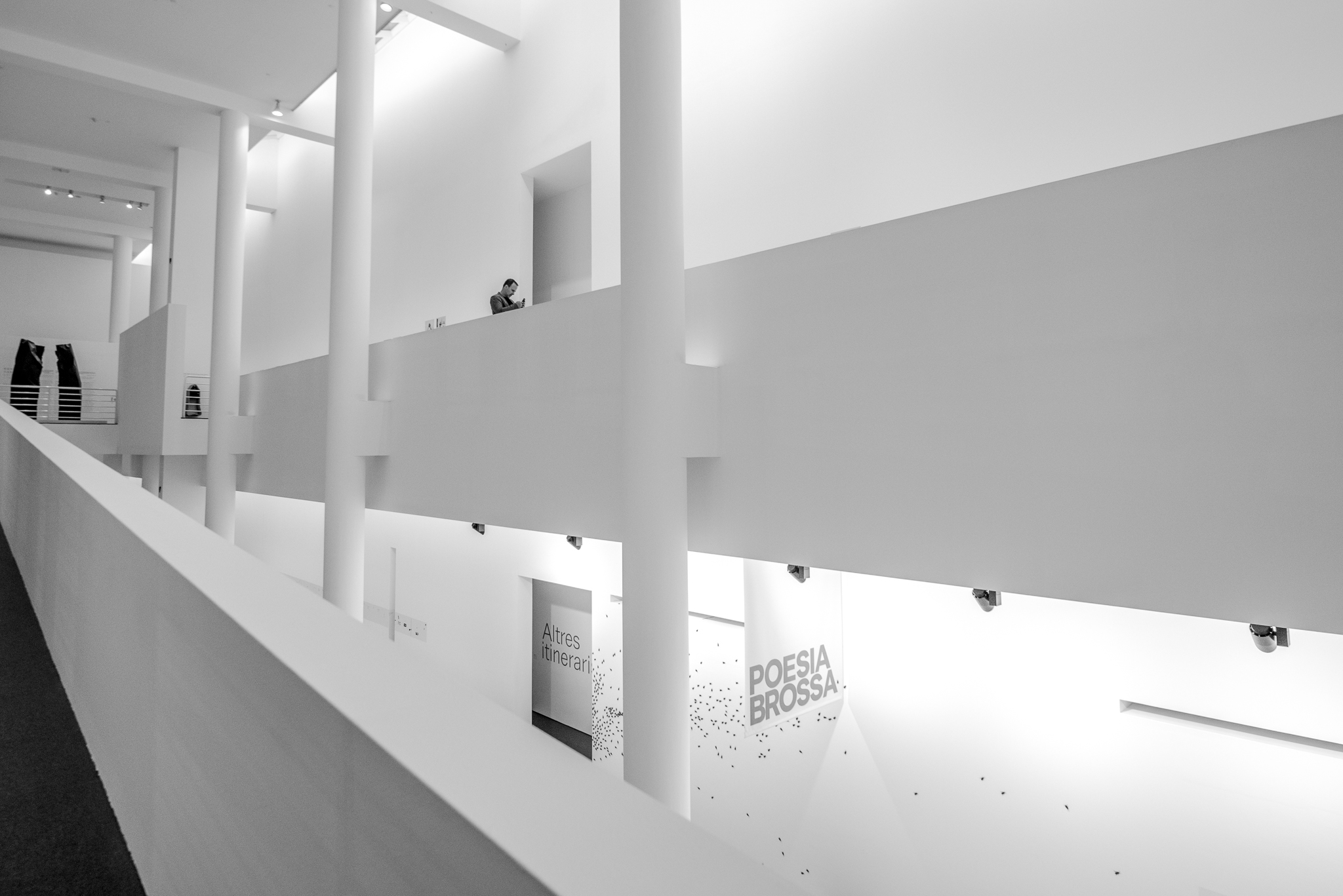
Interior view, MACBA, 2017

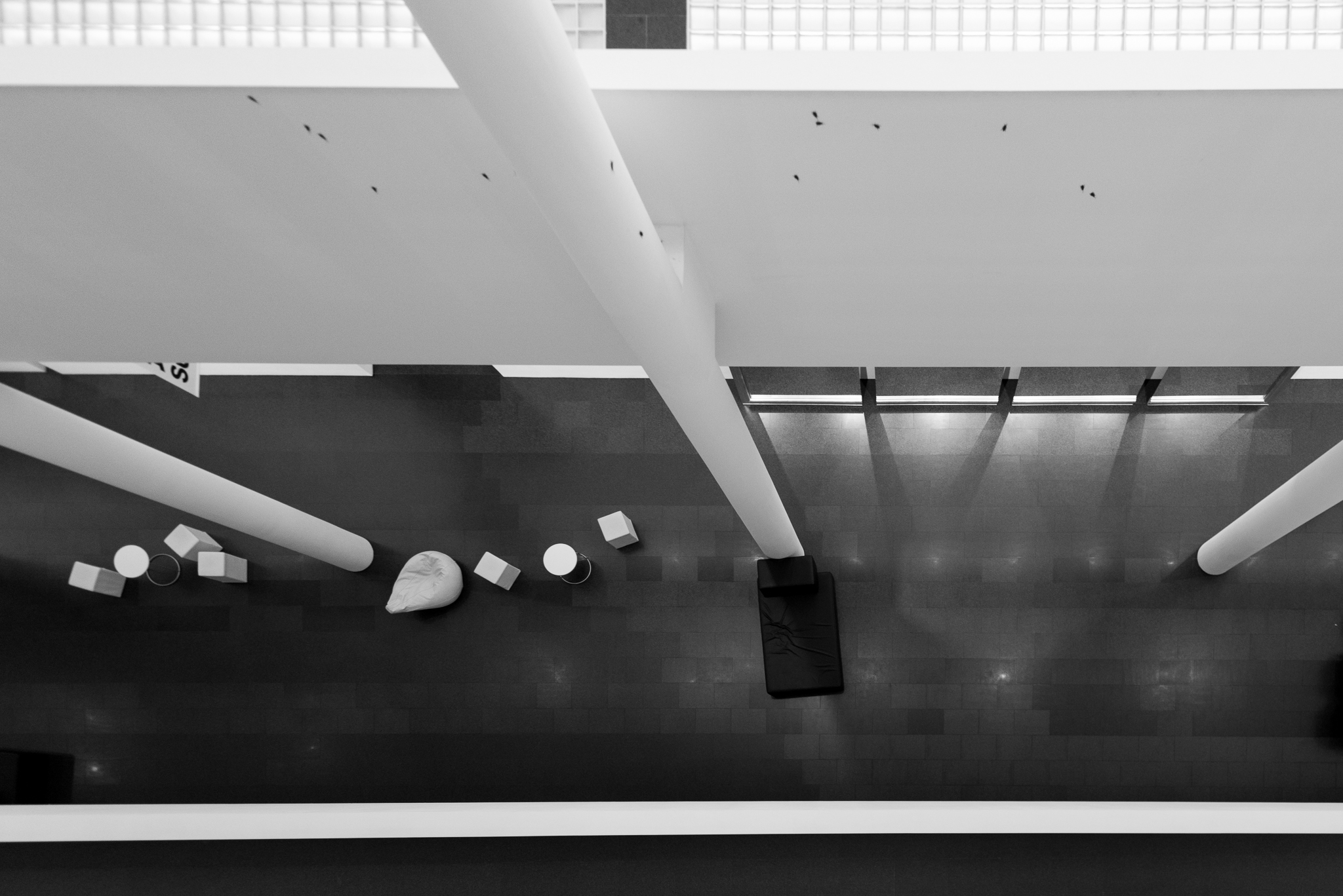
Interior top view, MACBA, 2017

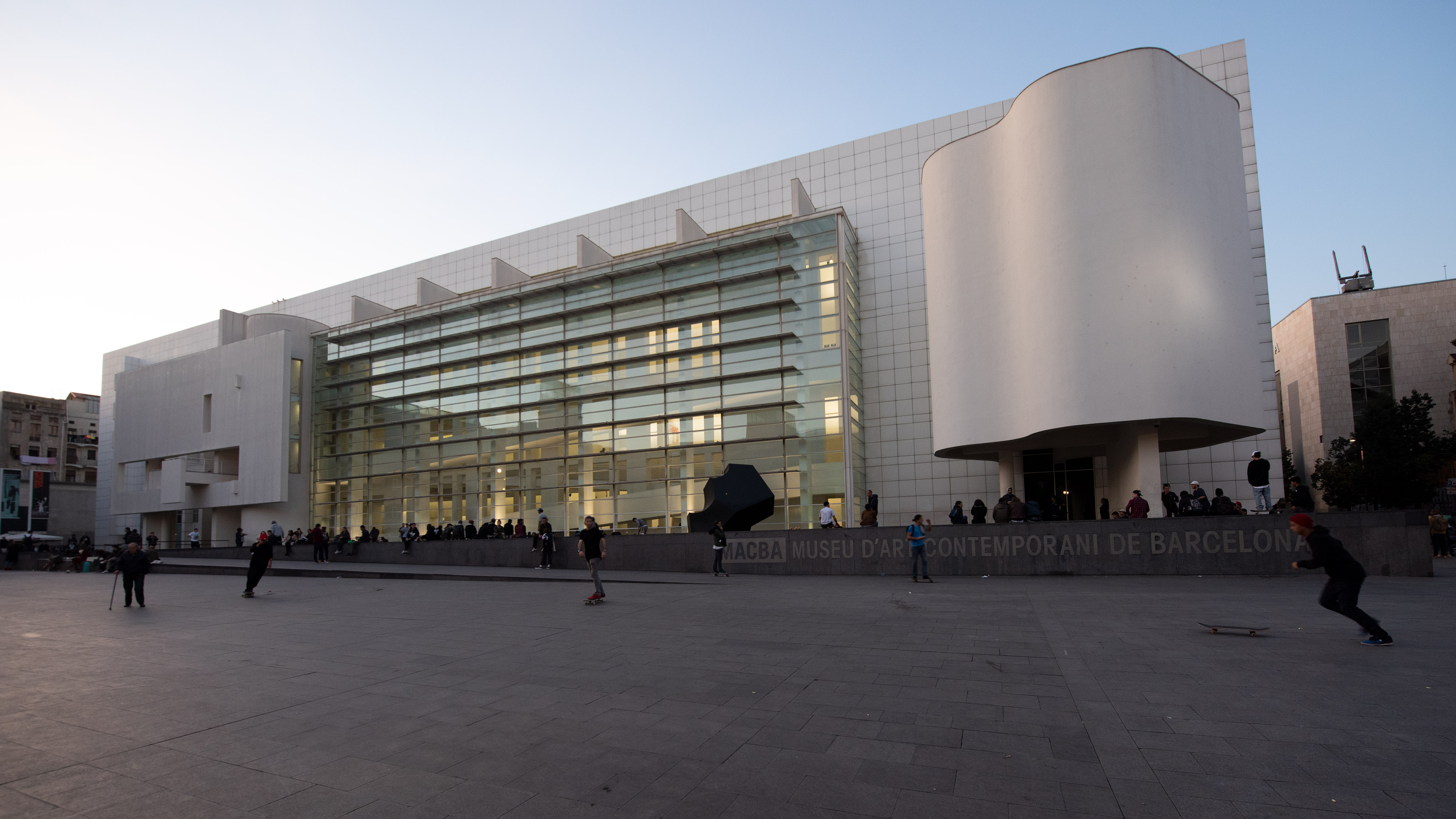
Exterior view, MACBA, 2017

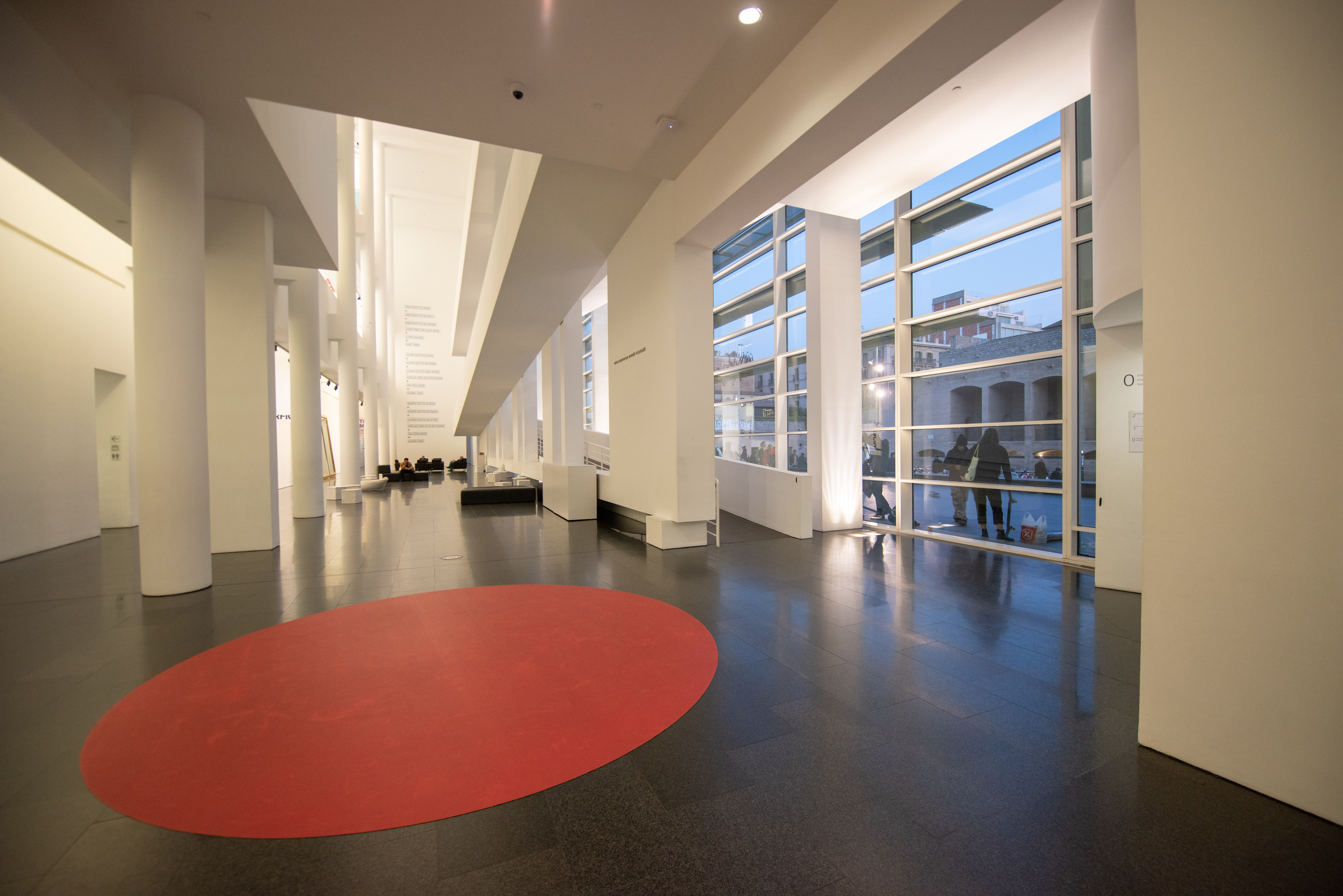
Interior view of base floor, MACBA, 2017

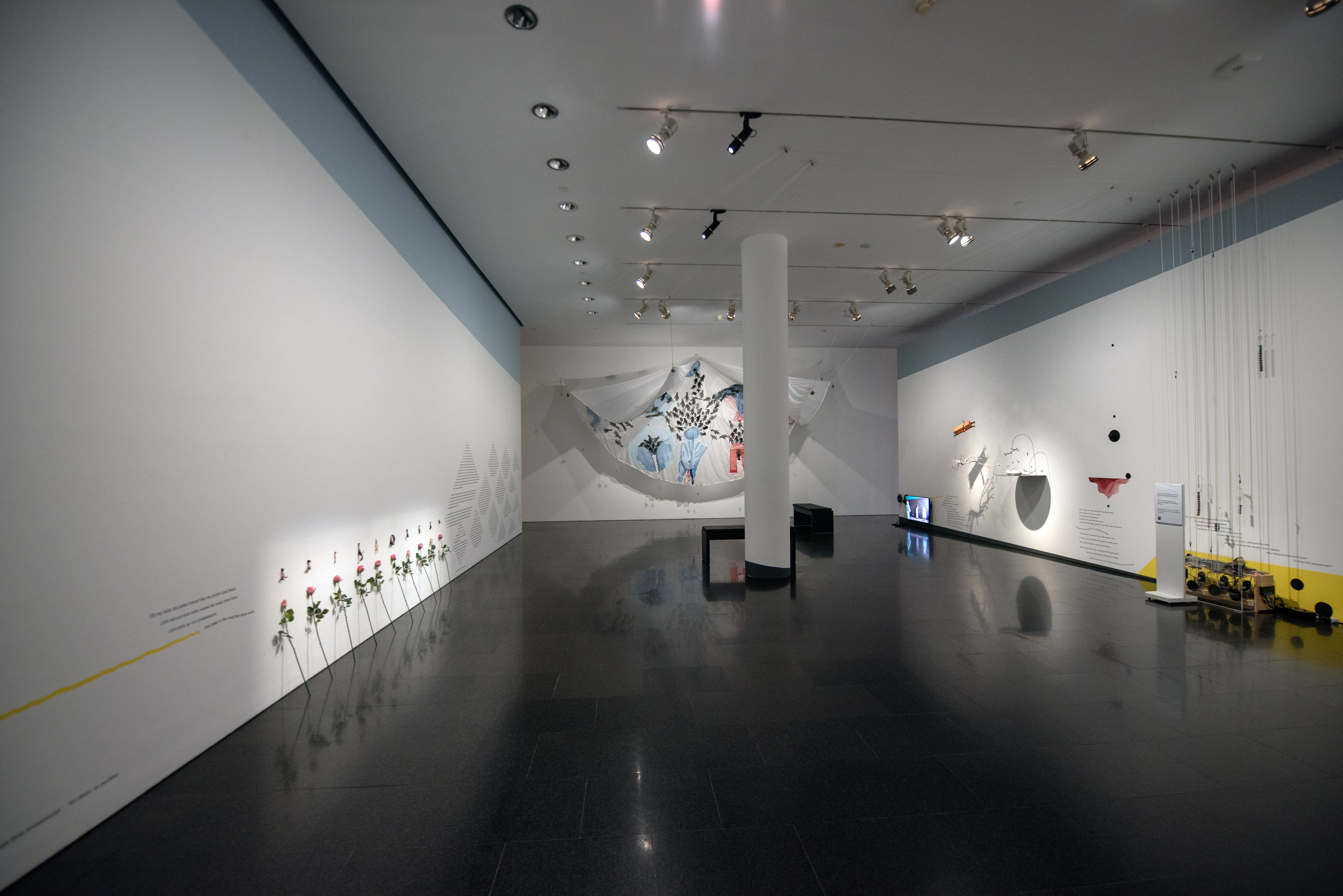
Interior view, MACBA, 2017

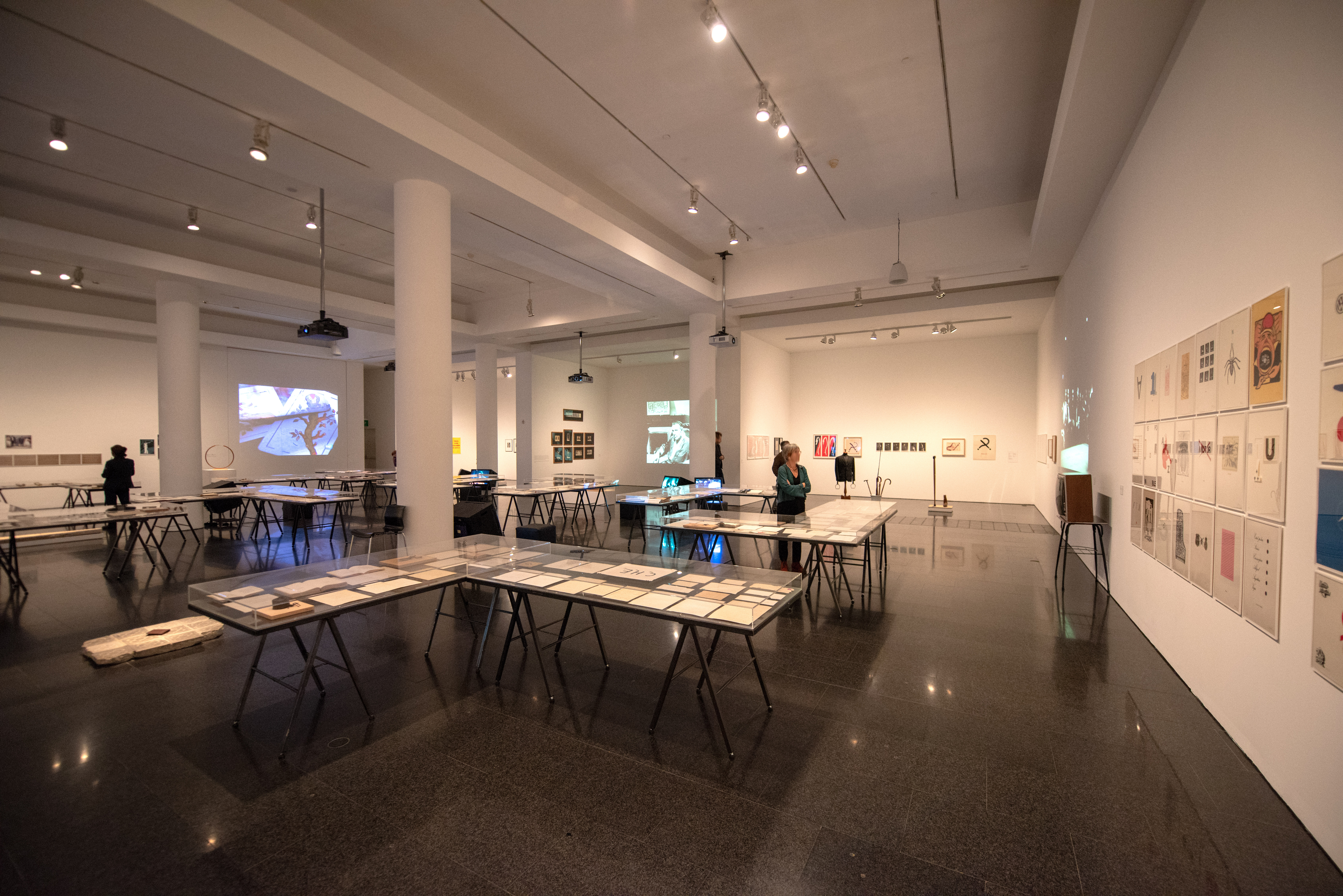
Interior view, MACBA, 2017

== See also ==
- List of museums in Barcelona
- Museo de Escultura al Aire Libre de Alcalá de Henares
- Rinzen, by Antoni Tàpies, conserved at the Museum
- Ràdio Web MACBA
