= Rinzen =

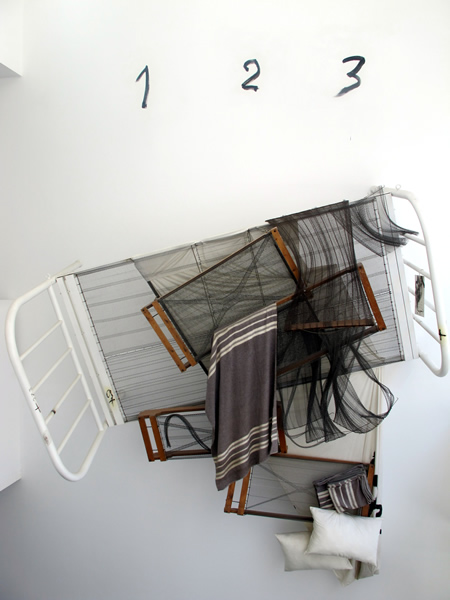
- Artist: Antoni Tàpies
- Year: 1993
- Type: Tridimensional. Iron bed, metal mesh mattress, blankets flock of wool, cotton fabric, iron folding chairs, wall painting, mixed media on wood and other element
- Location: MACBA; Barcelona
- Owner: Made-up Foundation

Rinzen is a sculpture by Antoni Tàpies conserved at MACBA, the Contemporary Art Museum of Barcelona.

== Description ==
Rinzen is a masterful piece by the Catalan artist Antoni Tàpies and has been part of the permanent collection of the MACBA, since it was donated by Repsol to the MACBA Foundation.

It was designed for the Spanish Pavilion at the XLV Venice Biennale of 1993 and won the Golden Lion for this event. Six years later, in 1998, Tàpies installed the work permanently in the MACBA.
