= Ferren =

Ferren is a given name and surname. Notable people with the name include:

- Carlyle Ferren MacIntyre (1890–1967), American poet
- Charles Ferren Hopkins (1842–1934), American Civil War soldier
- André Ferren (born 1943), French rugby player
- Bran Ferren (born 1953), American technologist
- John Ferren (1905–1970), American artist and educator
- John M. Ferren (born 1937), American judge

== See also ==
- Ferran (given name)
- Ferran (surname)
- Ferrin, given name and surname
- Ferron (disambiguation) § People
