= Antoni Tàpies =

Catalan painter and sculptor

The Most Illustrious Antoni Tàpies
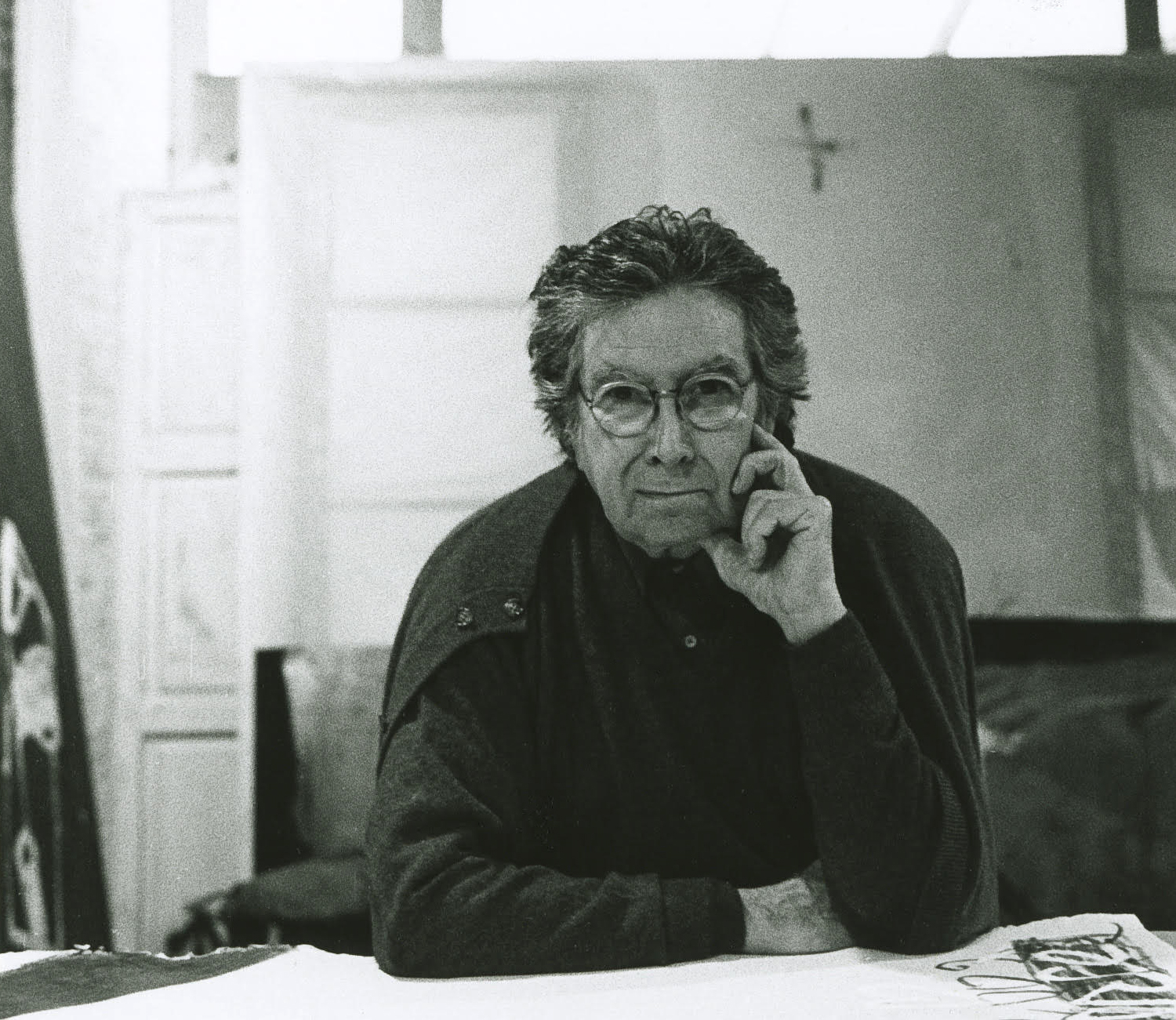
- Tàpies in 2002
- Born: 13 December 1923; Barcelona, Catalonia, Spain
- Died: 6 February 2012 (aged 88); Barcelona, Catalonia, Spain
- Known for: Painting, sculpture, lithography
- Movement: Art informel
- Awards: Praemium Imperiale

Antoni Tàpies i Puig, 1st Marquess of Tàpies (Catalan: [ənˈtɔni ˈtapi.əs]; 13 December 1923 – 6 February 2012) was a Catalan painter, sculptor, and art theorist.

Canvas Burned to Matter by Antoni Tàpies, c. 1960, Honolulu Museum of Art

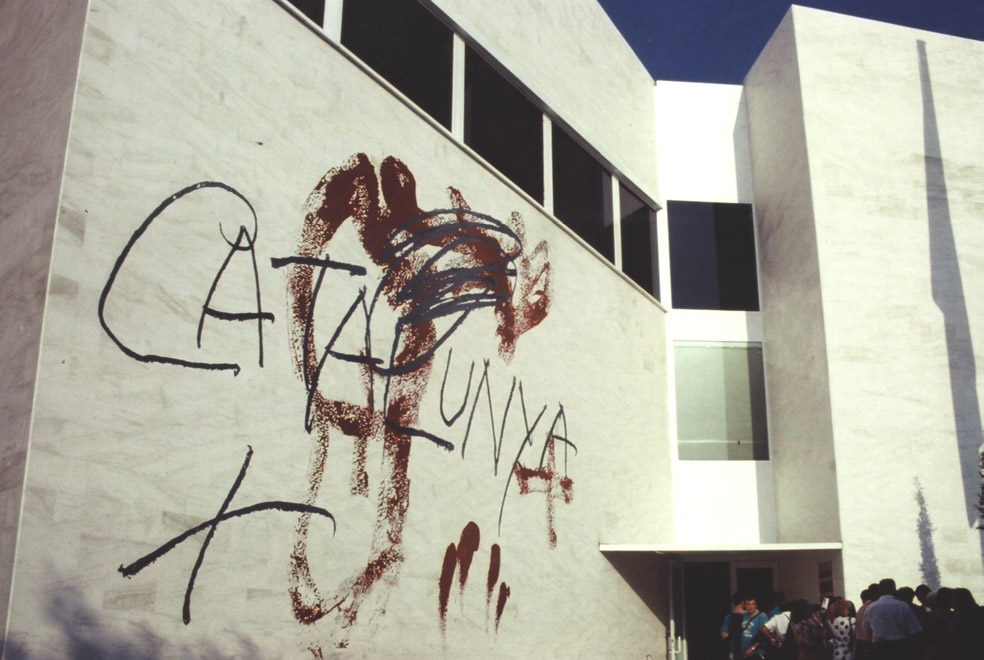
Mural at the Catalan Pavilion at the Seville Expo '92

== Life ==
The son of Josep Tàpies i Mestre and Maria Puig i Guerra, Antoni Tàpies Puig was born in Barcelona on 13 December 1923. His father was a lawyer and Catalan nationalist who served briefly with the Republican government. Due to this, Tàpies grew up in an environment where he was exposed to a variety of cultural and social experiences of leaders in the Catalan public life and its republicanism. His maternal grandmother also exposed him to this world with her great involvement in civil and political activities.

Tàpies was first introduced to modern art as he entered secondary school in 1934. In the same year, he became inspired by the famous Christmas issue of the magazine D'ací i d'allà, which contained reproductions of works by artists such as Marcel Duchamp, Georges Braque, Wassily Kandinsky, and Pablo Picasso. At 17, Tàpies suffered a near-fatal heart attack caused by tuberculosis. He spent two years as a convalescent in the mountains, reading widely and pursuing an interest in art that had already expressed itself when he was in his early teens.

Tàpies studied at the German School of Barcelona. After studying law for three years, he devoted himself from 1943 onwards only to his painting. In 1945 Tàpies began experimenting with materials. At this time he also became increasingly interested in philosophy, especially that of Jean-Paul Sartre as well as Eastern thought. He became known as one of Spain's most renowned artists in the second half of the 20th century. His abstract art and other avant-garde works were displayed in many major museums all over the world. In 1954, Tàpies married Teresa Barba Fabregas. Together, they had three children Antoni, Miguel and Clara. He lived mainly in Barcelona.

Tàpies died on 6 February 2012 at the age of 88.

== Work ==
Tàpies first came into contact with contemporary art as a teenager through the magazine D'Ací i D'Allà, published in Barcelona, and during the Spanish Civil War (1936–39), while he was still at school, he taught himself to draw and paint. On a French government scholarship in the early 1950s, he lived in Paris, to which he often returned. Both in Europe and beyond, the highly influential French critic and curator Michel Tapié enthusiastically promoted the work of Tàpies.

In 1948, Tàpies helped co-found the first post-war movement in Spain known as Dau al Set which was connected to the Surrealist and Dadaist Movements. The main leader and founder of Dau al Set was the poet Joan Brossa. The movement also had a publication of the same name, Dau al Set. Tàpies started as a surrealist painter, his early works were influenced by Paul Klee and Joan Miró; but soon became an informal artist, working in a style known as pintura matèrica, in which non artistic materials are incorporated into the paintings. In 1953, he began working in mixed media; which is considered his most original contribution to art. One of the first to create serious art in this way, he added clay and marble dust to his paint and used waste paper, string, and rags (Grey and Green Painting, Tate Gallery, London, 1957). Canvas Burned to Matter from c. 1960, in the collection of the Honolulu Museum of Art, is an example of the artist's mixed media assemblages that combine the principles of Dada and Surrealism.

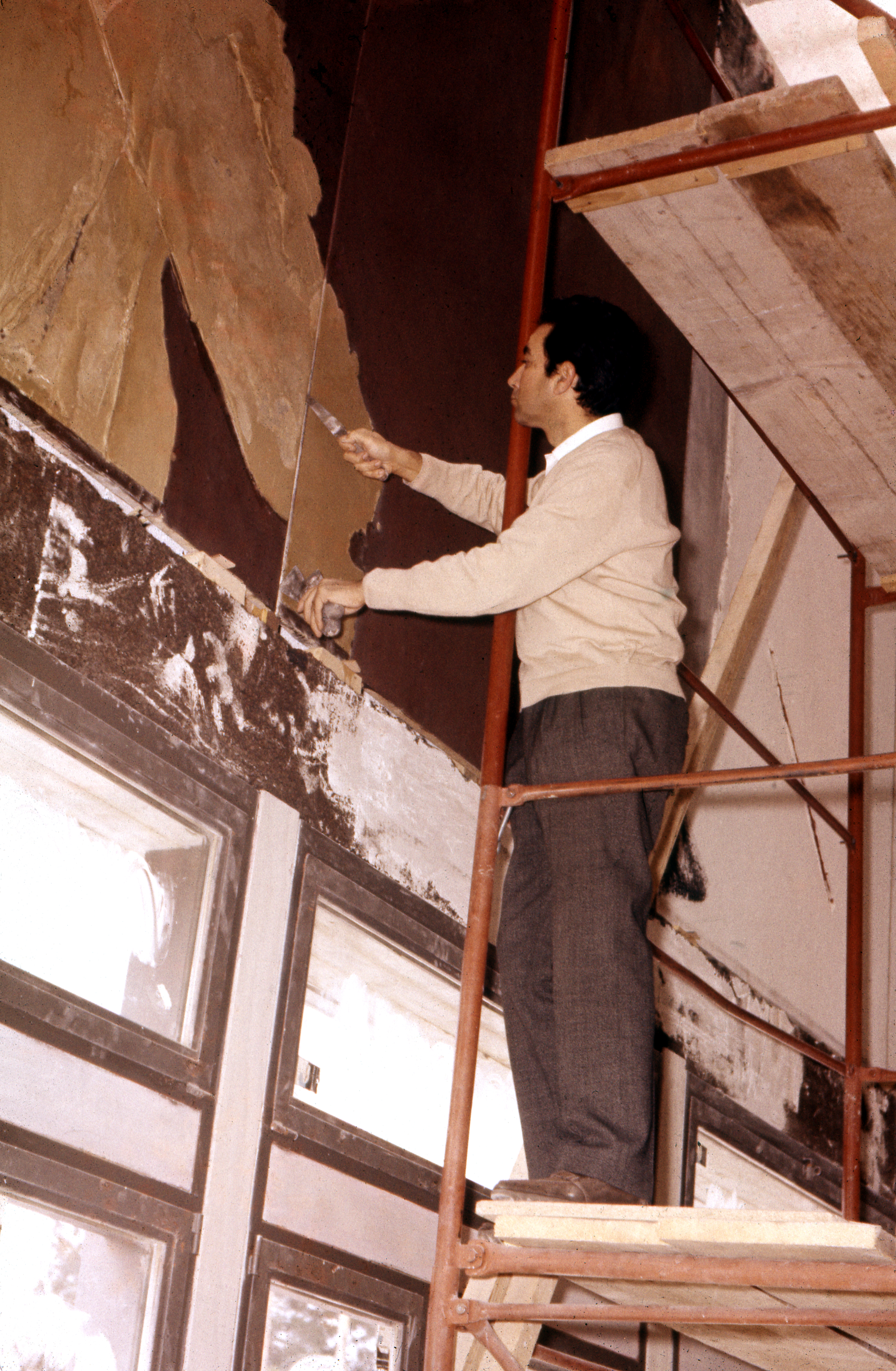
Tàpies working on a wall painting at the University of St. Gallen, 1962

Tàpies' international reputation was well established by the end of the 1950s. From the late 1950s to early 1960s, Tàpies worked with Enrique Tábara, Antonio Saura, Manolo Millares, and many other Spanish Informalist artists. In 1966, he was arrested at a clandestine assembly at the University of Barcelona; his work of the early 1970s is marked by symbols of Catalan identity (which was anathema to Franco). In 1974 he made a series of lithographs called Assassins and displayed them in the Galerie Maeght in Paris, in honour of militant anarchist Salvador Puig Antich's memory. In about 1970 (influenced by pop art), he began incorporating more substantial objects into his paintings, such as parts of furniture. Tàpies's ideas have had worldwide influence on art, especially in the realms of painting, sculpture, etchings, and lithography. Examples of his work are found in numerous major international collections. His work is associated with both Tachisme and Abstract Expressionism.

The paintings produced by Tàpies, later in the 1970s and in the 1980s, reveal his application of this aesthetic of meditative emptiness, for example in spray-painted canvases with linear elements suggestive of Oriental calligraphy, in mixed-media paintings that extended the vocabulary of Art informel, and in his oblique allusions to imagery within a fundamentally abstract idiom, as in Imprint of a Basket on Cloth (1980). Among the artists' work linked in style to that of Tàpies is that of the American painter Julian Schnabel as both have been connected to the art term "Matter".

=== Graphic work ===
Tàpies began producing graphic work in 1947. He produced collector's books and dossiers in association with poets and writers such as Alberti, Bonnefoy, Du Bouchet, Brodsky, Brossa, Daive, Dupin, Foix, Frémon, Gimferrer, Guillén, Jabès, Mestres Quadreny, Mitscherlich, Paz, Saramago, Takiguchi, Ullán, Valente, and Zambrano.

=== Essays ===
Tàpies has written essays which have been collected in a series of publications, some translated into different languages: La pràctica de l'art (1970), L'art contra l'estètica, (1974), Memòria personal (1978), La realitat com a art (1982), Per un art modern i progressista (1985), Valor de l'art (1993) and L'art i els seus llocs (1999). These works include Tàpies reflecting on things such as art, life, and politics. He also discusses the social role of art and the artist, reflects on the influences of his work, and explains his artistic as well as political views.

== Movements ==
Throughout the span of his life, Tàpies was associated with a number of movements such as Art Informel and Haute Pâte, both of which were popular in post-war Europe. He became a part of the avant-garde group Dau al Set in 1948, a group that had strong ties to Surrealism. Early works of his were surrealistic, but in 1953 he began working in abstract art. Some of Tàpies's most famous and original works fall within this genre. They are characterized by his use of marble dust and clay that he mixed with his paints as well as the incorporation of found objects such as string, paper, and cloth. In the late 1960s into the early 1970s Tàpies began to be influenced by the movement of pop art. Because of this he began using larger items, such as pieces of furniture, in his works.

== Exhibitions ==
- In 1950, Tàpies' first solo show was held at the Galeries Laietanes, Barcelona, and he was included in the Carnegie International in Pittsburgh.
- In 1953 he had his first shows in the United States, at the Marshall Field Art Gallery in Chicago and the Martha Jackson Gallery in New York.
- In 1962 he was given the opportunity to have a Guggenheim Retrospective.
- Some of his other retrospectives were presented at the Musée National d'Art Moderne, Paris, in 1973 and at the Albright-Knox Art Gallery, Buffalo, New York, in 1977.
- Later he was the subject of retrospective exhibitions at the Jeu de Paume in Paris in 1994.
- Kestnergesellschaft in Hannover in 1998.
- In the year 2000 in New York, he had an exhibition at the Pace Gallery, which consisted of multimedia paintings as well as small bronzes and assemblages.
- The Museo Nacional Centro de Arte Reina Sofía in Madrid in 2000, and was exhibited at the Anita Shapolsky Gallery in New York City in 2006, 2012, and 2014.
- In 2007 at the age of 83, Tàpies had an exhibition at Pace Wildenstein where he showed 17 paintings done on wood as well as canvas.
- In 2017, Nahmad Contemporary in New York presented the exhibition Tàpies: Paintings, 1970–2003.
- 'Antoni Tàpies. Objects'. Until February, 2018 at Fundació Antoni Tàpies museum, Barcelona
- In 2018, DE SARTHE in Hong Kong presented Manolo Millares - Antoni Tàpies: An Informel Step, a joint exhibition focusing on post-war abstract art.

== Legacy ==
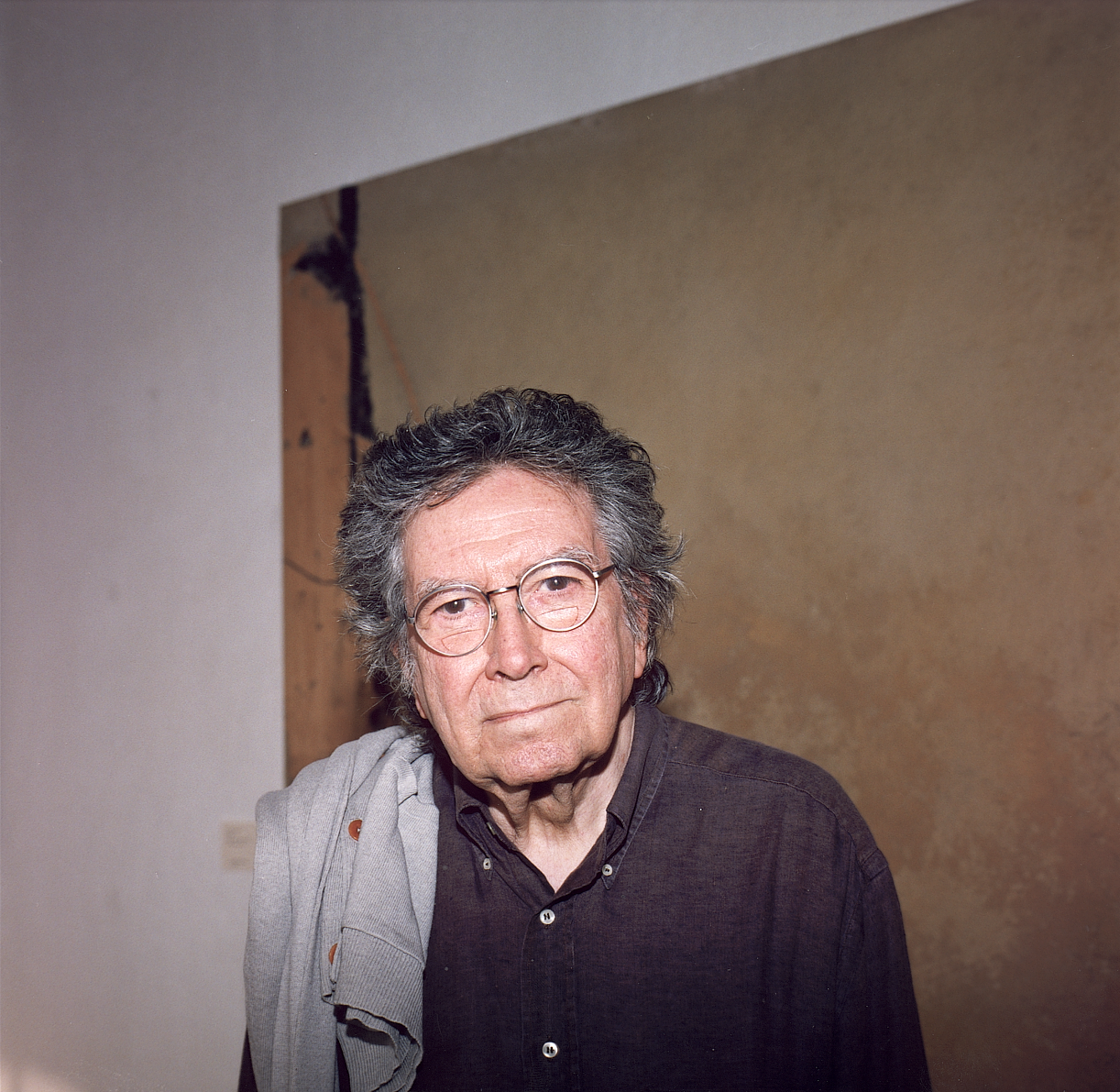
Antoni Tàpies

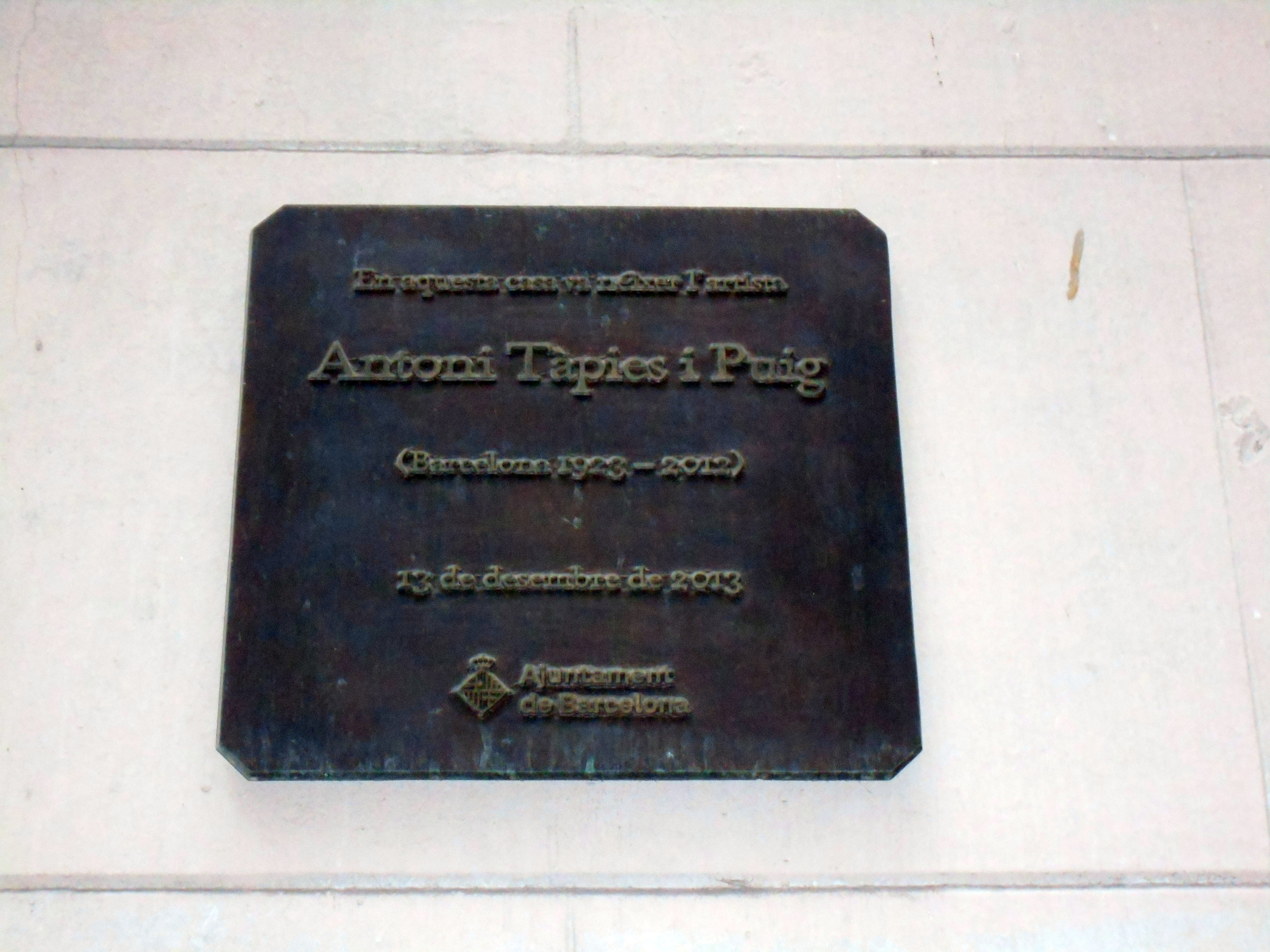
Plaque on the facade Antoni Tàpies' birthplace, 39 Canuda Street, Barcelona

The Fundació Antoni Tàpies is a museum and cultural center located in Carrer d'Aragó, in Barcelona that is dedicated to the works and life of Antoni Tàpies. It was established in 1984 by Tàpies himself. His intent was to create a forum that would promote the study as well as the knowledge of modern and contemporary art. It includes the temporary exhibitions, film seasons, lectures, symposiums, as well as different activities and showings of Tàpies's work. The foundation owns one of the most extensive collections of Tàpies's work, mostly donated by Tàpies himself. It also contains a large library that is dedicated solely to the artists of our century and the modern literature and documentation pertaining to the genre.

== Recognition ==
- Tàpies was awarded in 1958 the First Prize for painting at the Pittsburgh International, and the UNESCO and David E. Bright Prizes at the Venice Biennale.
- In 1958 Tàpies, along with Eduardo Chillida, represented Spain in the Venice Biennale.
- He received the Rubens Prize of Siegen, Germany, in 1972.
- In the Academic Sphere, he received an Honorary Doctorate from the Rovira i Virgili University in 1994.
- In 2003 Tàpies won Spain's most prestigious art award, the Velázquez prize.
- On 9 April 2010, he was raised into the Spanish nobility by King Juan Carlos I with the hereditary title of Marqués de Tápies (Marquess of Tàpies) (English: Marquess of Tàpies).
- Furthermore, he designed Rovira i Virgili University’s logo, which is characterized by the letter "a", symbol of the university's knowledge principle.

== Gallery of works ==
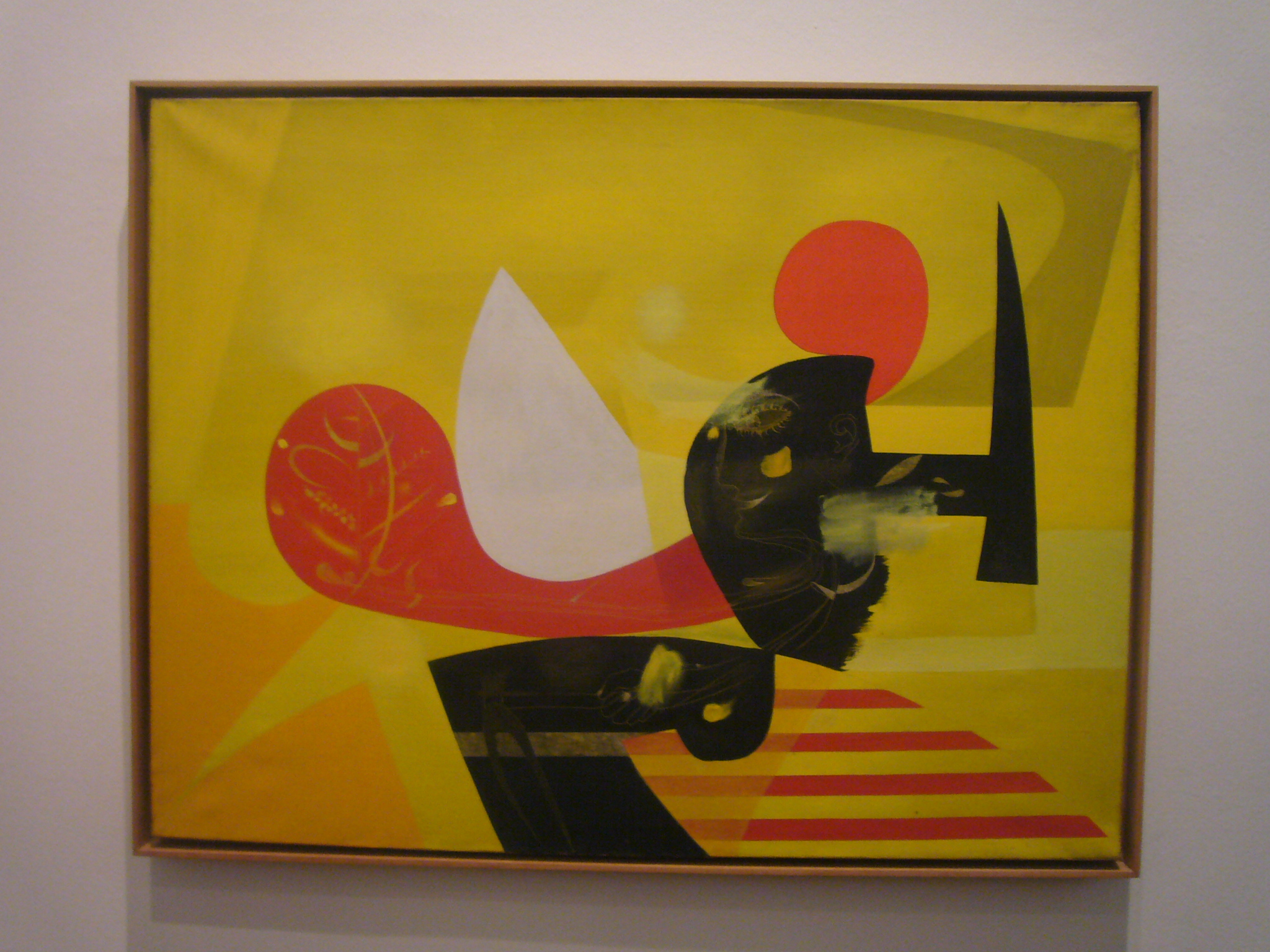
Tàpies, 1952, Els Solcs, oil-painting

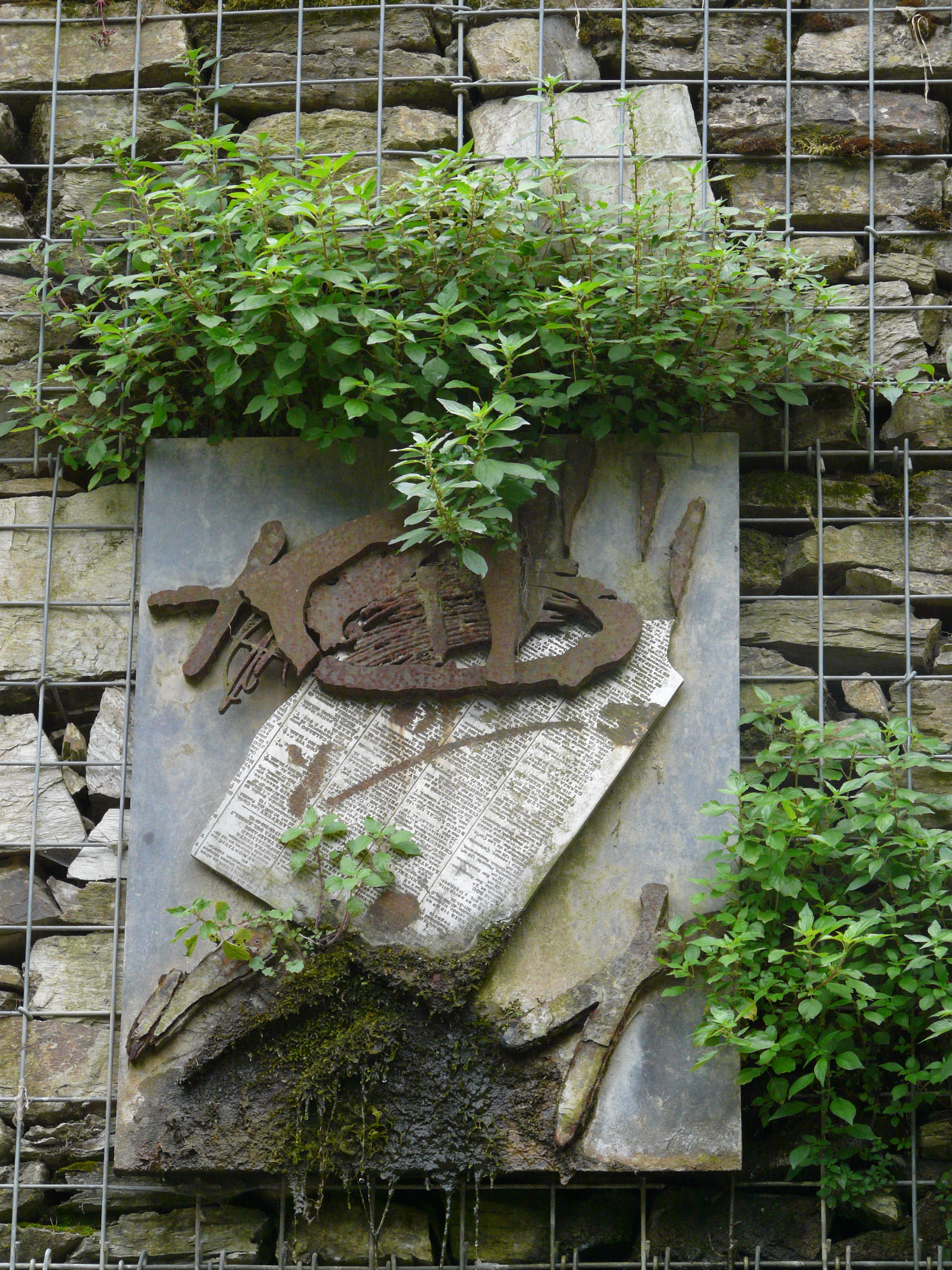
Tàpies, 1971, Escut font de la Budellera, sculpture / relief

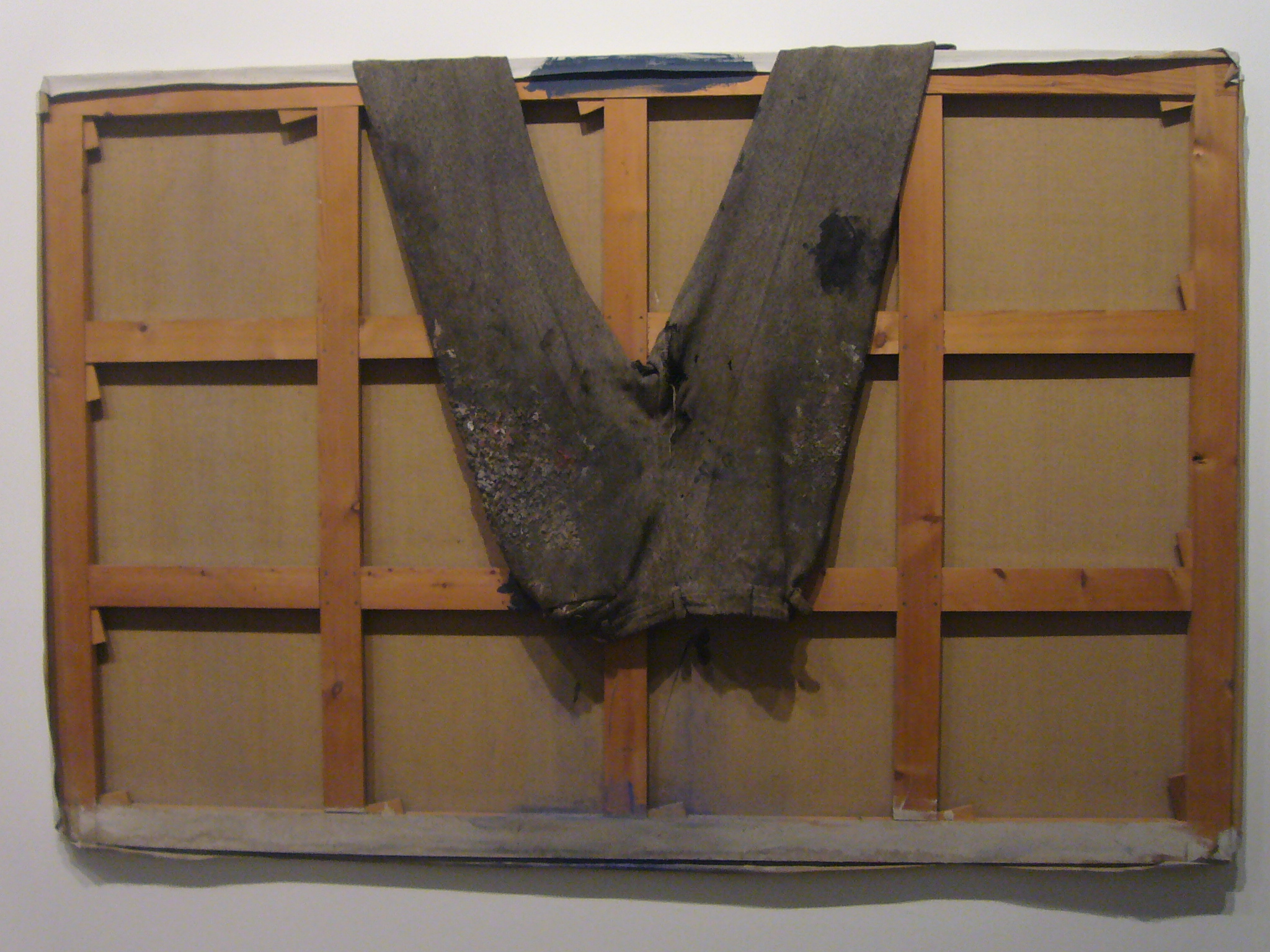
Tàpies, 1971, Pantalons sobre vestidor / Trousers on stretchers, textile on the backside of a stretched canvas

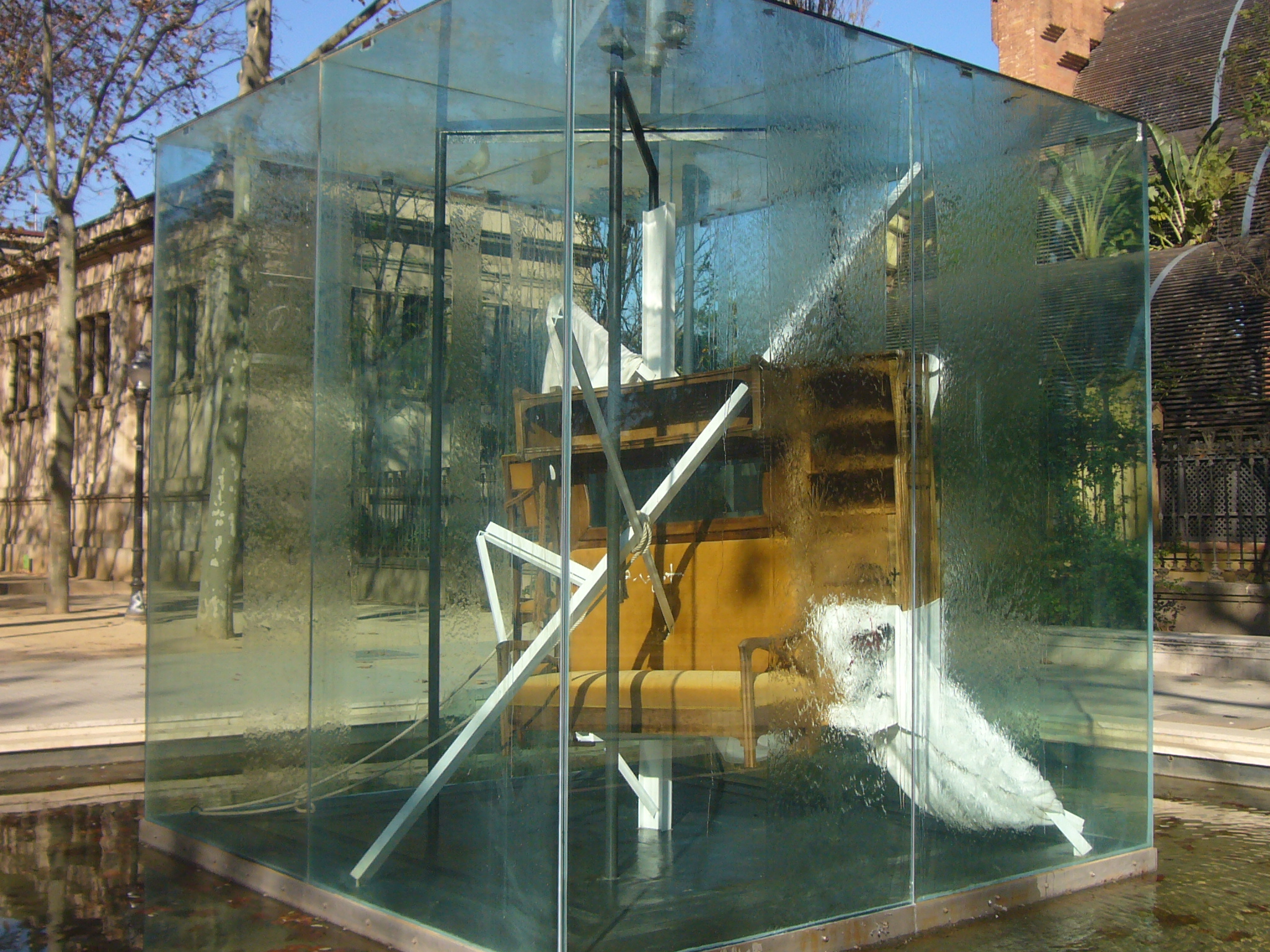
Tàpies, 1982–83, Homage to Picasso / Homenatge a Picasso, installation

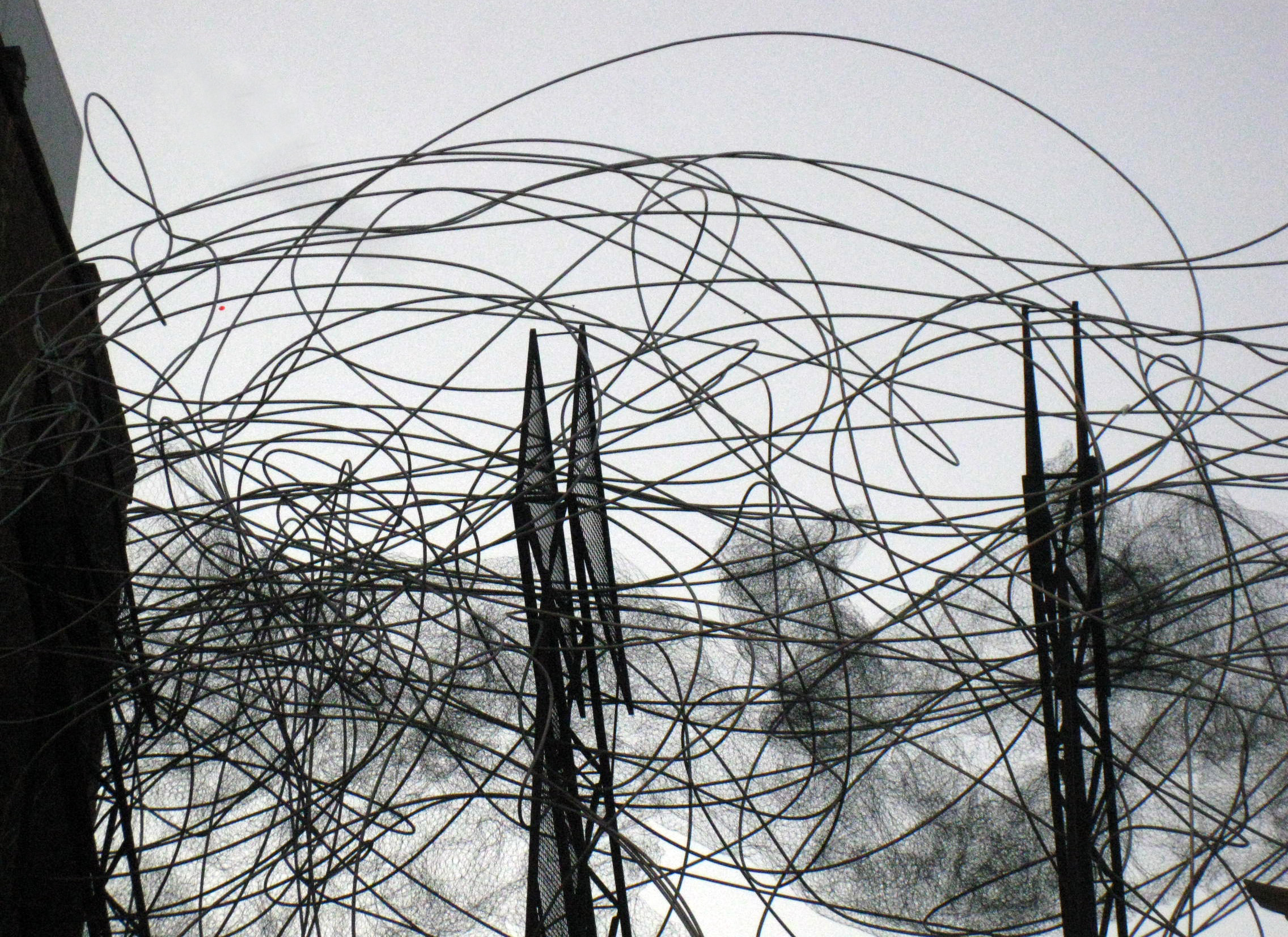
Tàpies, 1990, Núvol i Cadira / Cloud and Chair, tube-sculpture above the facade of the Fundació Antoni Tàpies

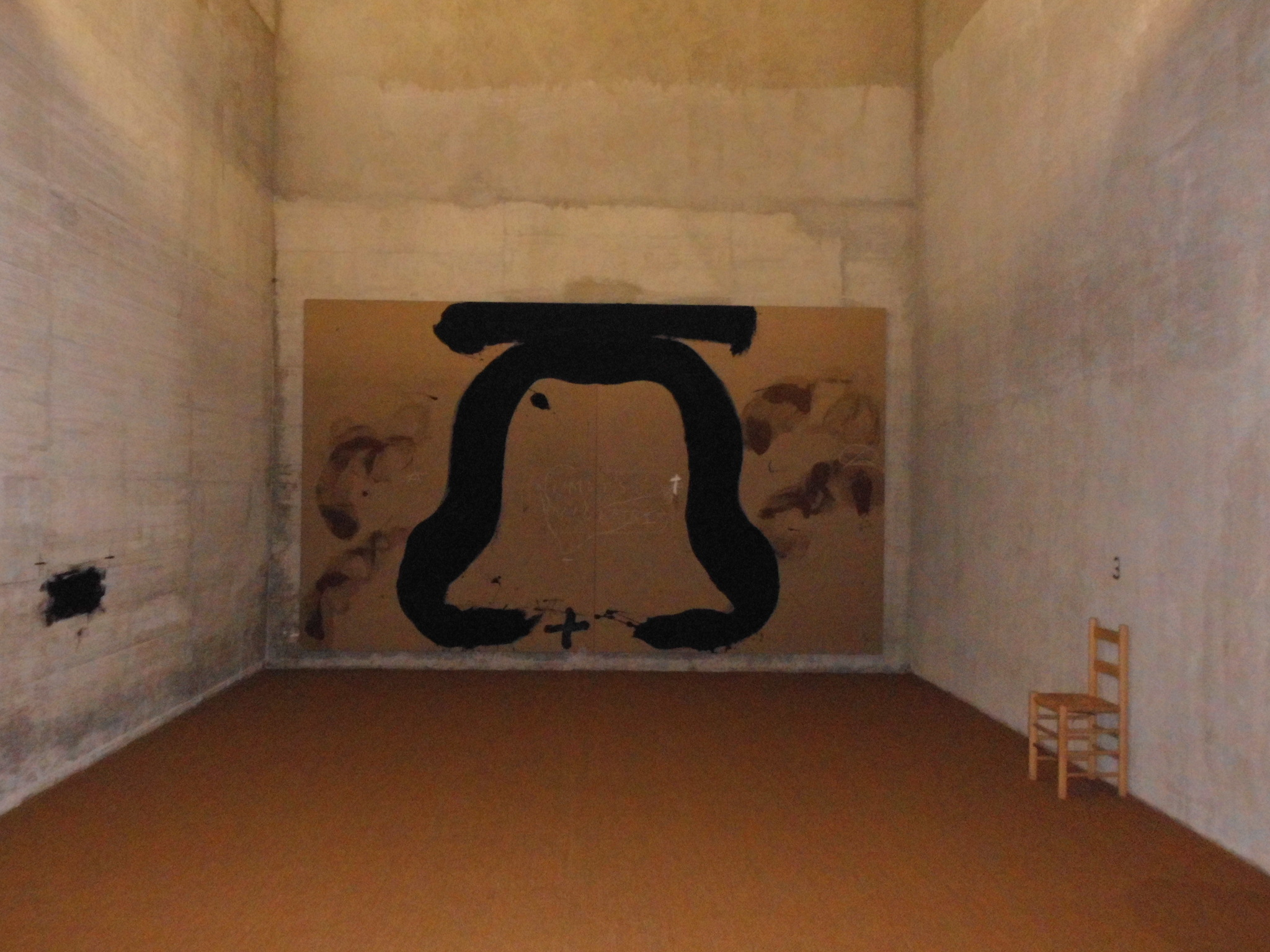
Tàpies, 1991, Conté el Díptic de la campana - part of project 'Sala de Reflexió'

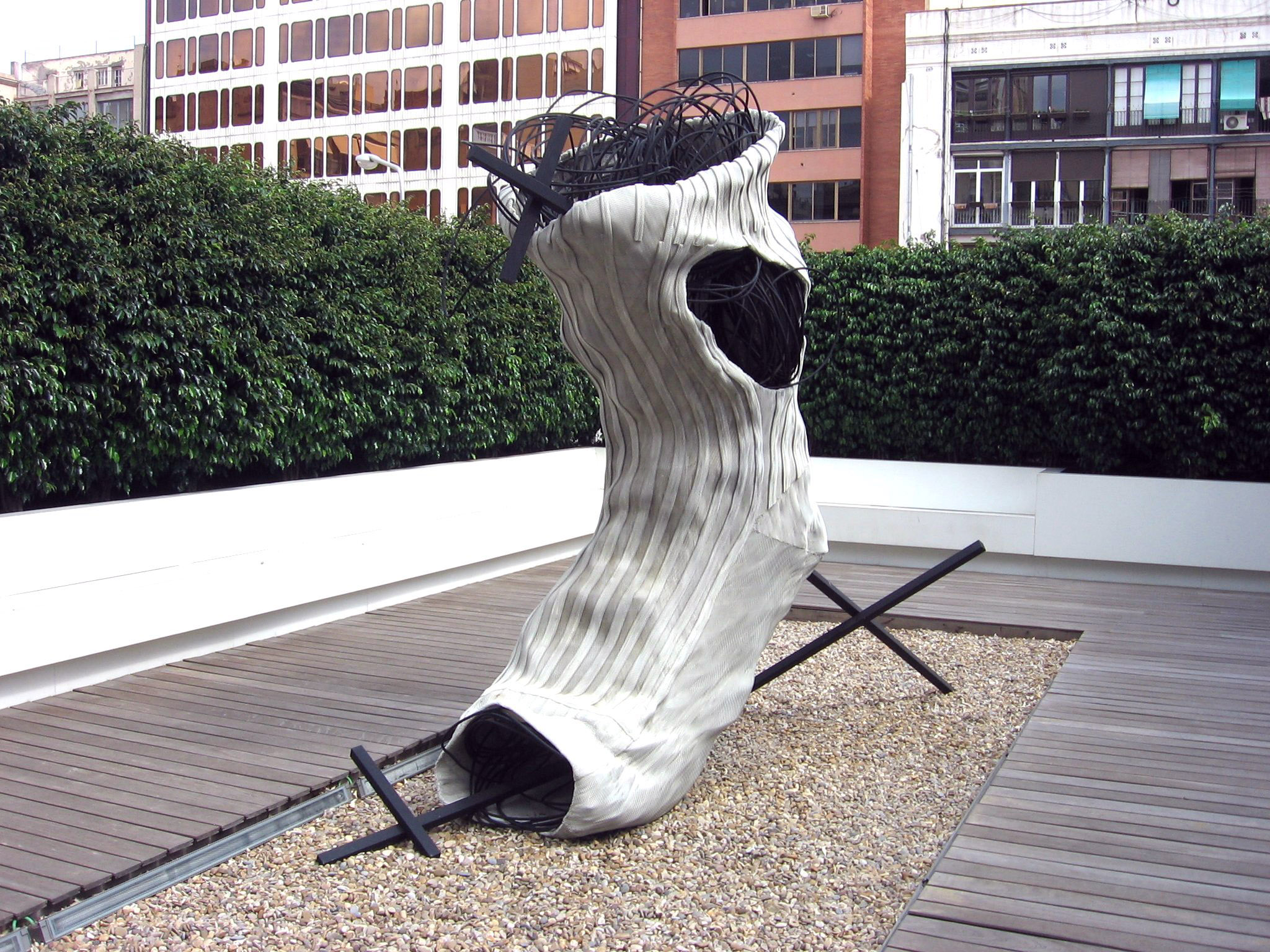
Tàpies, 1991, Mitjó, sculpture

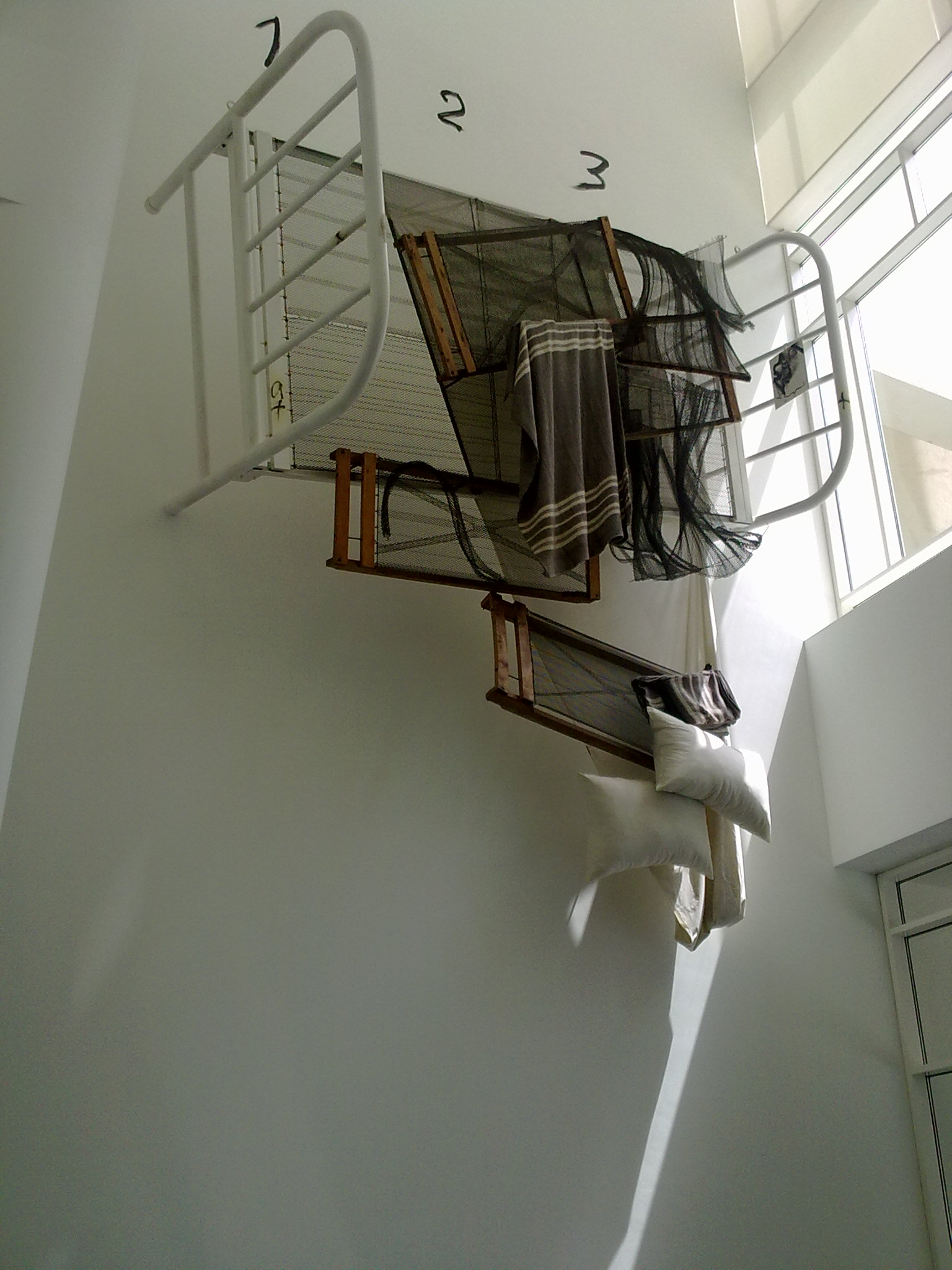
Tàpies, 1993, Rinzen, installation

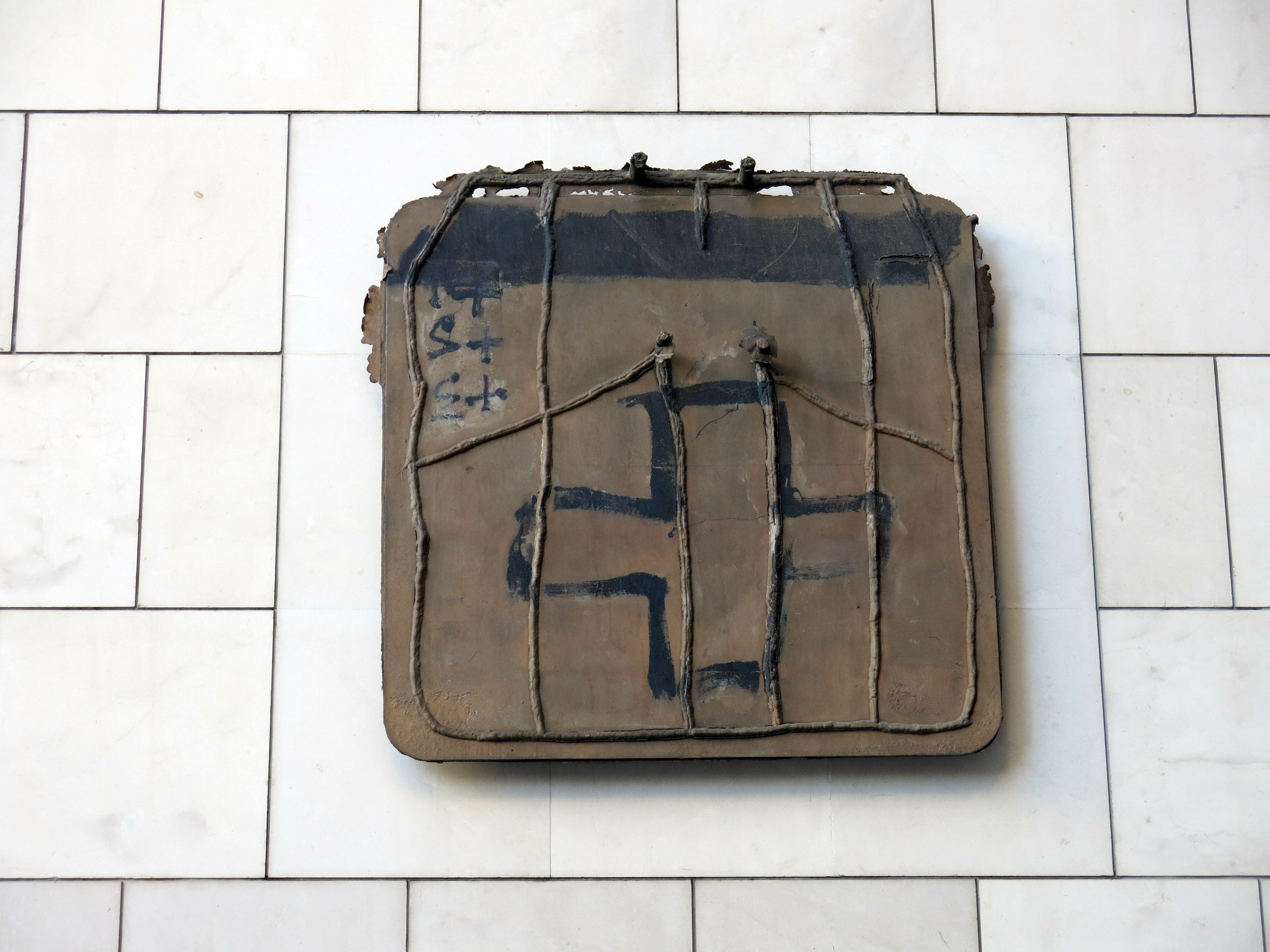
Tàpies, undated, Creu 31

== See also ==
- Rinzen, work by Tàpies conserved at MACBA in Barcelona

== Notes ==
Spanish nobility
New title	Marquess of Tápies; 9 April 2010 – 6 February 2012	Succeeded by Antoni Tàpies i Barba
