= Antoni Tàpies i Barba =

Antoni Tàpies i Barba, 2nd Marquis of Tàpies (born Barcelona, January 1, 1956), is a Catalan doctor, poet and translator, son of the painter Antoni Tàpies i Puig.

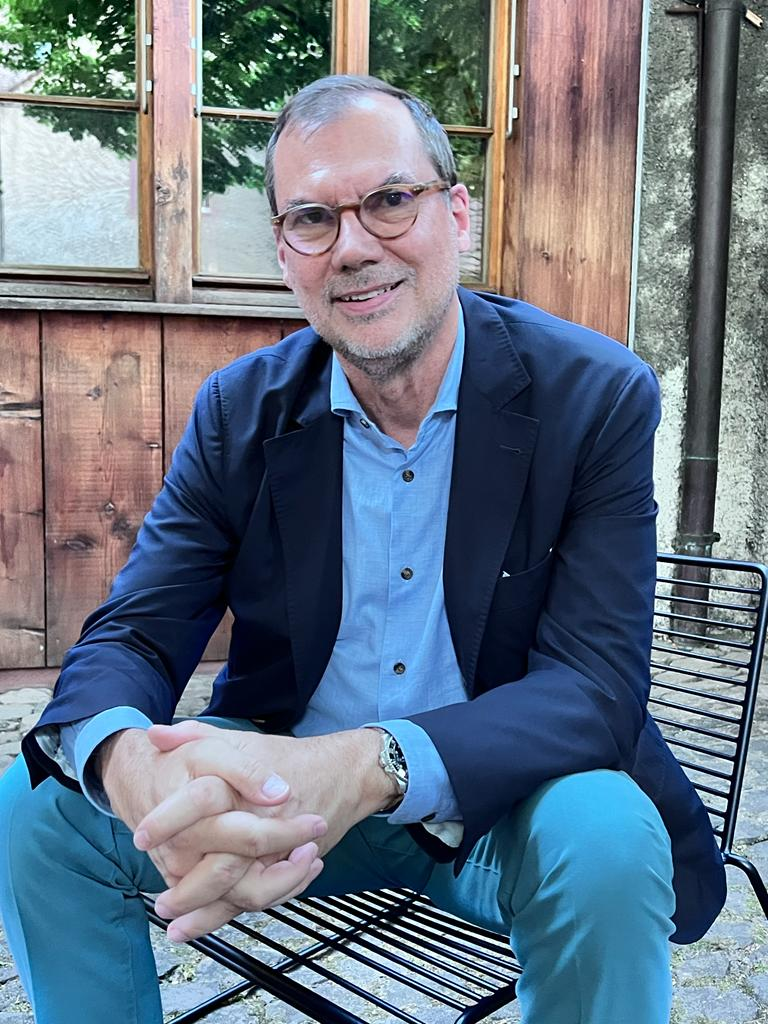

He began in visual poetry, influenced by calligrammatic avant-garde, publishing Siboc in 1973 in Llibres del Mall. With Les danses d'u (1975) he tried to bring together various cultural experiences within the framework of writing. In Dies d'aigües (1980) he was more elegiac and evocative of personal experience. Other works of his in the field of poetry are La veu del vent (1988), Matèria dels astres (1992) and L'escrivent (1999). In 1992 he began in narrative with Des de l'ombra. He has also translated several works from German to Catalan, such as Himnes a la Nit by Novalis (1975) and Novel·la d'infant by Klaus Mann (1981).

In 2012 he inherited the title of Marquis of Tàpies, after the death of his father. He is also a member of the Board of Trustees of the Fundació Antoni Tàpies, and director of Edicions T, a publishing house specializing in editions of graphic works by contemporary artists and bibliophile books.
