= Marquess of Tápies =

Spanish hereditary title

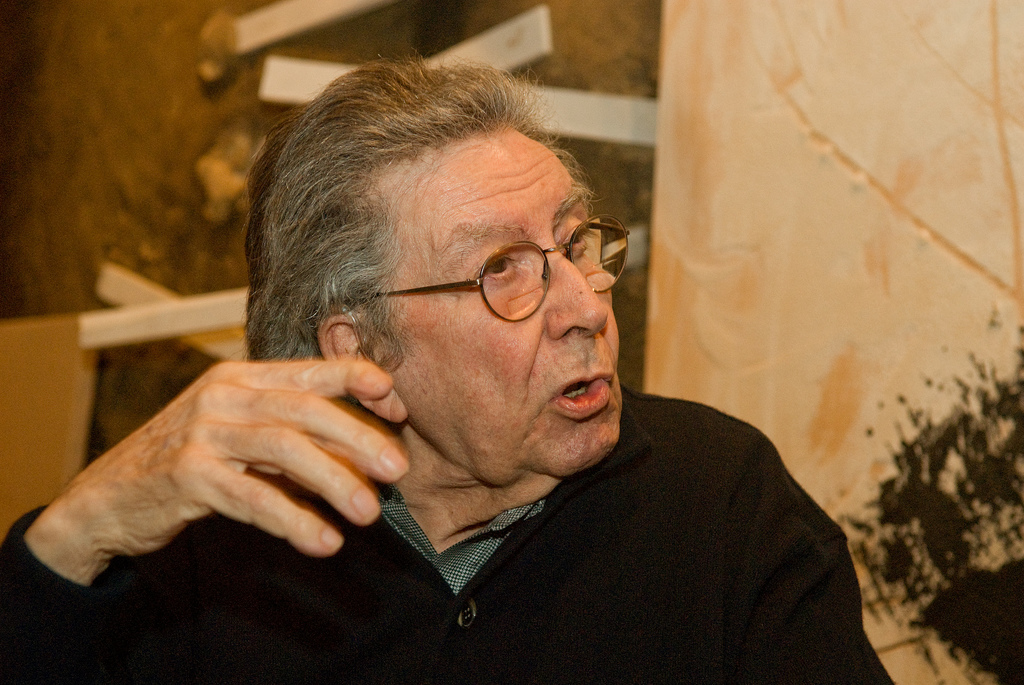

Marquess of Tápies (Spanish: Marqués de Tápies) is a Spanish hereditary title which was bestowed by King Juan Carlos I of Spain upon Antoni Tàpies on 9 April 2010 by Royal Decree 433/2010. Tàpies received the title in honor of his work as a painter, sculptor and art theorist.

The current holder of the title is Antoni Tàpies i Barba, the eldest son of Antoni Tàpies i Puig, effective 2012 upon 1st Marquess' death.

== Holders ==
- Antoni Tàpies i Puig, 1st Marquess of Tápies (2010-2012)
- Antoni Tàpies i Barba, 2nd Marquess of Tápies (2012–present)
