= McFerrin =

McFerrin is a surname. Notable people with the surname include:

- Bobby McFerrin (born 1950), American jazz and pop singer
- John Berry McFerrin (1807–1887), Methodist preacher and chaplain of the Confederate States Army during the American Civil War
- Melissa McFerrin, American basketball coach
- Robert McFerrin (1921–2006), American opera singer
- Taylor McFerrin, American DJ, music producer, keyboardist and beatboxer
