= Mary Upton Ferrin =

American suffragist

Mary Upton Ferrin (1810-1881) was an American suffragette and women's rights advocate.

== Early life ==
Polly Upton was born to Jesse and Elizabeth Wood Upton on April 27, 1820 in South Danvers, Massachusetts (now known as Peabody). Elizabeth Wood Upton and Jesse Upton had three daughters and one son before Polly's birth in 1820. Polly Upton, who was named after one of their deceased daughters, was later renamed Mary Upton.

== Marriage ==
Mary Upton married Jesse Ferrin in Danvers Baptist Church on December 2, 1845. Mary Upton Ferrin referred to her husband as an "insufferable tyrant" who "deprived her of the necessities of life". She attempted to divorce her husband, but was told by lawyer Samuel Merritt that she was legally considered her husband's property. After announcing her intention to divorce Jesse Ferrin, he claimed all her possessions as his own.

== Activism ==
Upton Ferrin created a petition for women to sign requesting legislation to be passed that gave the women the right to divorce their husbands. The petition was presented by Mary Upton Ferrin to the US Senate and US House of Representatives on March 2, 1849. In 1869, Upton Ferrin wrote and published a pamphlet titled Women's Defence.
