= Abi Ferrin =

American fashion designer

- Occupation: Fashion designer

Abi Ferrin is a fashion designer based out of Dallas, Texas.

== Biography ==
Ferrin spent her childhood in Wyoming, and eventually majored in government and broadcast journalism. Inspired by her major, Abi moved to Washington D.C. to pursue a career along the lines of her collegiate studies. Disillusioned with the political environment and career opportunities in Washington D.C., she resolved instead, to follow her dream into the fashion industry and moved to California landing in Hollywood. An avid sewer since a young age, and with little money after her move, she began designing and making clothes of her own design. Her gamble paid off, and she was discovered at an industry party. This led to her big break, designing clothing for the show Extra, where she broke into the Hollywood scene with several "new looks." Eventually Abi tired of the fickle fashion industry of the Hollywood scene, and despite incurring $50,000 in debt, again took a gamble, this time by relocating to Dallas in 2006.

=== Accomplishments ===
Abi Ferrin was named "Texas' Next Top Designer" by Stanley Korshak in 2007. Along with the title came $25,000 to start her company, a loft in downtown Dallas and a business grant to start her business in Dallas. Since 2007 Abi Ferrin has been well known in the Dallas fashion scene and the business has continued to grow each year. In 2009, Abi Ferrin the company has grown 25%, and even in the times of economic downturn the company continues to grow each year. Her clothing is sold in Nordstrom and boutique stores nationwide as well as online.

Abi Ferrin's designs have been seen in many editorials including D Fashion, London Financial Times, Inmag.com, Papercity, and Dallas Morning News. Many celebrities have also been seen wearing Abi's fashions, including Perry Reeves, Molly Sims, Erykah Badu, Claudia Jordan, Carrie Underwood and Paris Hilton. In 2010, Abi Ferrin appeared in Elle Magazine's Spring Ready to Wear line. After appearing at the 2010 Spring Fashion Week in New York. In 2011 Abi Ferrin was chosen to design the clothing for the 10th Annual Off the Fields Players Wives Fashion Show. Abi's designs were worn on the runway by many NFL wives, both past and present.

=== Freedom Project ===
Abi lives and works by her motto, "Fashion with Freedom and Purpose", Abi Ferrin incorporates handmade buttons into each of her designs, buys them at fair market value, and donates an additional 600% of the asking price to an organization in Nepal for women rescued from the sex trade. These buttons are handmade by the women who are rescued from the sex trade, and are given work at a place in Nepal called Guardian Vision Handcrafts. Abi Ferrin says that she feels as if these "custom made adornments" will "give women a feeling of authenticity, while each button holds a greater value". Abi Ferrin is also teaming up with her sister Kelly, who has worked as a humanitarian for her whole career, and is getting involved with the organization Vision Trust, to expand their involvement in global organizations. October 2009.
