= Ferran Barenblit =

Argentine museum director (born 1968)

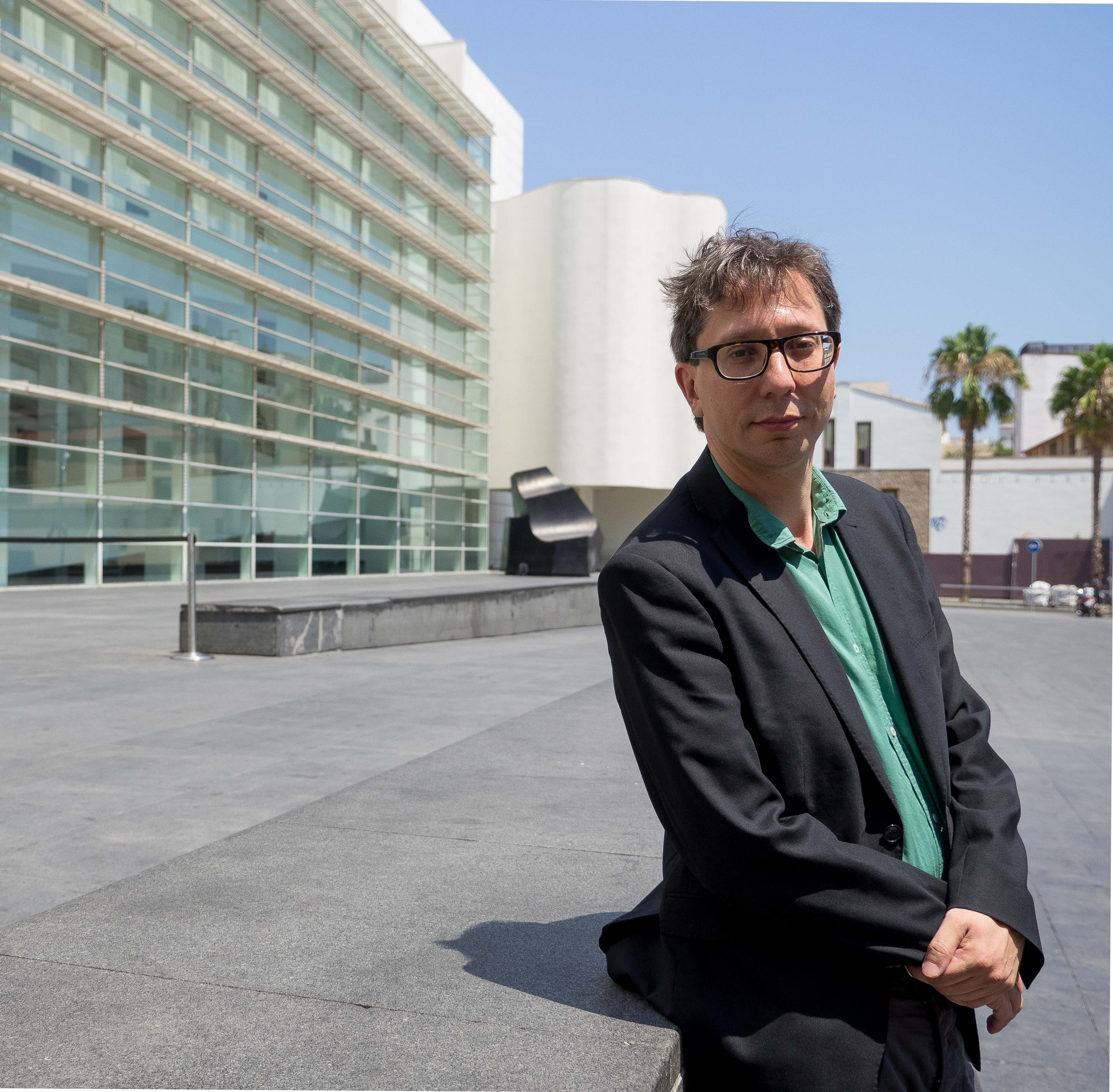

Ferran Barenblit (born 1968, Buenos Aires) is an Argentine museum director. He studied Art History at the Universitat de Barcelona (1991) and Museology at New York University (1995).

Ferran Barenblit was director of the Centre d'Art Santa Mònica in Barcelona from 2003 to 2008, when he was appointed to direct the CA2M in Madrid. Between 2015 and 2021 he was the director of the MACBA Barcelona Museum of Contemporary Art.

In July 2026 the Academic Committee of the Power Station of Art appointed him Chief Curator of the 16th Shanghai Biennale, which will open in November 2027.

== Bibliography ==
- Barenblit, Ferran. Anatomies de l'ànima. Barcelona: Fundació Miró, 1997 [Consulta: 12 abril 2013].
- Barenblit, Ferran. Cercles Invisibles. Barcelona: Fundació Miró, 1998.
- Barenblit, Ferran. Ironia. Barcelona: Fundació Miró, 2001. ISBN 84 932159 0 2.
