= Julio Ferrón =

Uruguayan footballer (born 1988)

Personal information
- Full name: Julio César Ferrón Álvez
- Date of birth: 12 July 1988 (age 38)
- Place of birth: Montevideo, Uruguay
- Height: 1.85 m (6 ft 1 in)
- Position: Centre back

Senior career*
Years	Team	Apps	(Gls)
2009–2015	Danubio	20	(0)
2011	→ El Tanque Sisley (loan)	13	(0)
2012	→ Defensa y Justicia (loan)	11	(0)
2015	→ El Tanque Sisley (loan)	7	(0)
2015	Universitario de Sucre	2	(0)
- * Club domestic league appearances and goals

Julio César Ferrón Álvez (born 12 October1988) is a Uruguayan former footballer who played as a defender.

In January 2012, he signed a six-month loan with Argentine side Defensa y Justicia.
