= Ferran Pol =

Andorran footballer

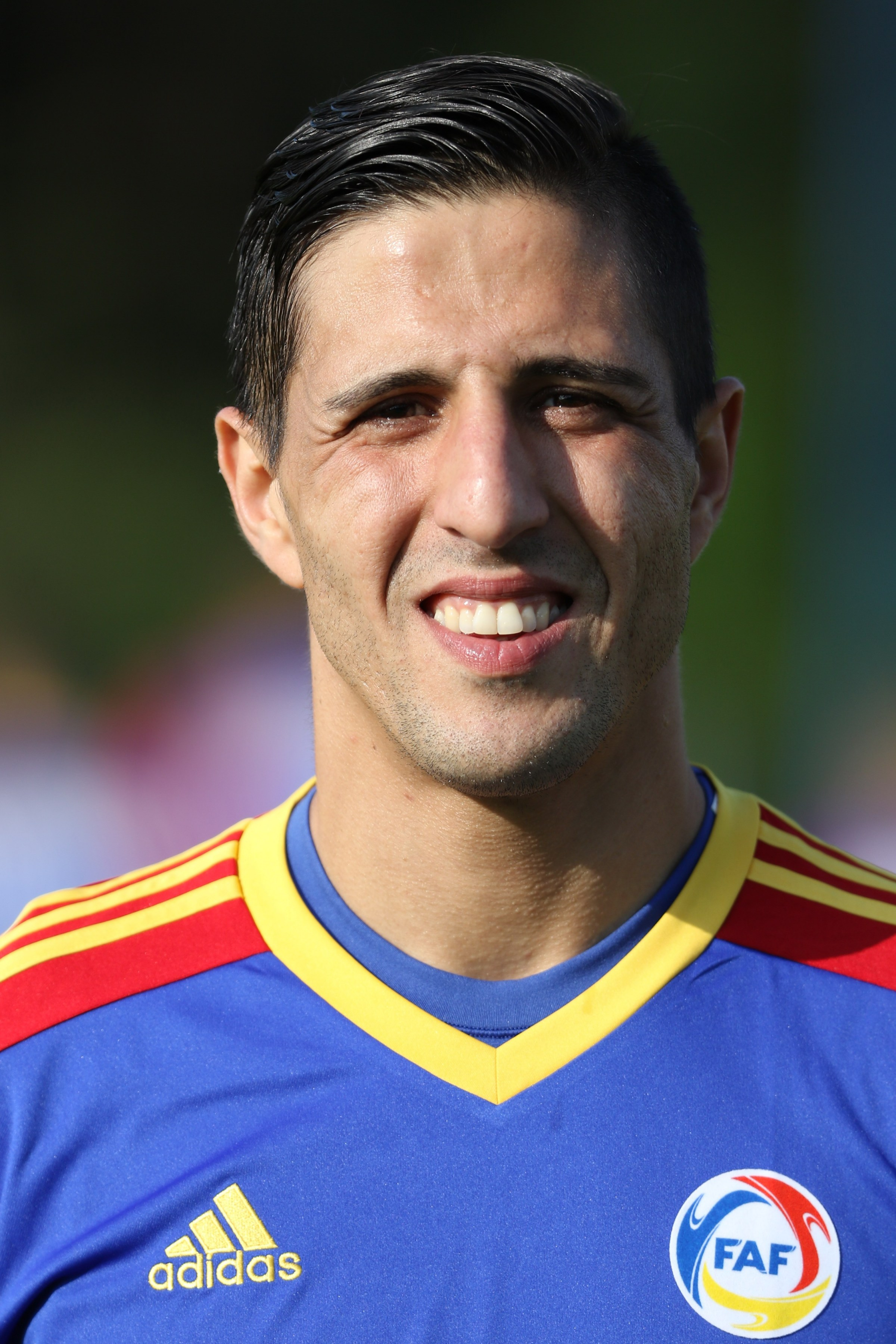

Personal information
- Full name: Ferran Pol Pérez
- Date of birth: 28 February 1983 (age 43)
- Place of birth: Andorra la Vella, Andorra
- Height: 1.82 m (6 ft 0 in)
- Position: Goalkeeper

Senior career*
Years	Team	Apps	(Gls)
2002–2003	Horta		
2003–2006	Masnou		
2006–2008	Gramenet	23	(0)
2008–2009	Vilassar de Mar	34	(0)
2009–2010	Sants		
2010–2013	FC Andorra	93	(0)
2013–2014	Lusitanos	24	(0)
2014–2018	FC Andorra	131	(0)
2018–2019	UE Sant Julia	15	(0)
2019–2021	UE Santa Coloma	20	(1)

International career
2010–2019	Andorra	27	(0)
- * Club domestic league appearances and goals

Ferran Pol Pérez (born 28 February 1983) is an Andorran former international footballer who last played as a goalkeeper for UE Santa Coloma.

== International career ==
Pol made his senior international debut on 2 June 2010 in a 1-0 friendly defeat to Albania.
