= Ralph Ferron =

Luxembourgish footballer

Ralph Ferron (born 13 May 1972) is a Luxembourgish international footballer with 26 caps.
