= Ferran (name) =

Ferran or Ferrán is a given name and surname. Notable people with the name include:

- Anne Ferran (born 1949), Australian photographer
- Augusto Ferrán (1835–1880), Spanish poet
- Eilís Ferran (born 1962), Northern Irish legal scholar, solicitor and academic administrator
- Francis Ferran (died 1923), Irish politician
- Gerardo Díaz Ferrán (born 1942), Spanish businessman
- Gil de Ferran (born 1967), French-born Brazilian racing driver and team owner
- Javier Ferrán (born 1956), Spanish businessman
- Kim Ferran (born 1958), British speed skater
- Pascale Ferran (born 1960), French film director and screenwriter
- Patsy Ferran (born 1989), Spanish-British actress
- Vilma Ferrán (1940–2014), Argentine actress
- Ferran Torres (born 2000) Spanish football player

== See also ==
- Ferren, given name and surname
- Ferrin, given name and surname
- Ferron (disambiguation) § People
