= John Mecom =

John Mecom may refer to:

- John W. Mecom Sr., American oilman
- John W. Mecom Jr., his son, American businessman and football team owner
