= Louisiana Stadium and Exposition District =

The Louisiana Stadium and Exposition District (LSED) is a public agency and political subdivision of the State of Louisiana, established in 1972 to finance, own, and manage major sports, entertainment, and exposition facilities in the New Orleans metropolitan area. Best known as the owner of the Caesars Superdome, Smoothie King Center, and Champions Square, the LSED plays a central role in maintaining the infrastructure that supports large-scale national events such as the Super Bowl, College Football Playoff, and NCAA Final Four.

The district is governed by a board of commissioners appointed by the governor and operates under the oversight of the Louisiana state legislature. It is authorized to issue bonds, collect taxes and fees, and enter into long-term lease agreements with professional sports teams, including the New Orleans Saints of the NFL and the New Orleans Pelicans of the NBA.

Since its founding, the LSED has overseen billions of dollars in construction, renovation, and recovery projects-including post-Hurricane Katrina repairs and recent modernization programs-making it a key institution in the development of Louisiana's sports tourism and entertainment economy.

== History ==
The LSED was formally established in late 1966 during the administration of Governor John J. McKeithen, whose support for a domed stadium in New Orleans laid the political groundwork for the agency’s creation and financing powers. Its creation was driven by the city’s ambition to attract a professional football franchise and expand its capacity to host large-scale events. One of the district’s first major undertakings was the financing and construction of the Louisiana Superdome (now Caesars Superdome), which opened in 1975 as one of the largest domed stadiums in the world.

Much of the early momentum behind the project was driven by Dave Dixon, a New Orleans sports entrepreneur whose lobbying efforts and vision for a multipurpose domed stadium were instrumental in the establishment of the LSED and the eventual construction of the Superdome.

Over the years, LSED’s authority was expanded through legislation enabling it to issue bonds, collect dedicated tax revenues, and enter into lease agreements with professional sports franchises such as the New Orleans Saints and New Orleans Pelicans. Following Hurricane Katrina in 2005, the LSED played a central role in coordinating and funding the $185 million renovation of the Superdome, allowing it to reopen in time for the 2006 NFL season. The district has also overseen numerous facility upgrades to meet NFL and NCAA requirements for hosting Super Bowls, Final Fours, and other marquee events.

== Facilities Managed ==
The Louisiana Stadium and Exposition District (LSED) owns, operates, or finances several major sports and entertainment venues in the New Orleans area:

- Caesars Superdome: Opened in 1975 and originally known as the Louisiana Superdome, it is the flagship facility under LSED's management. The stadium is home to the New Orleans Saints of the NFL and regularly hosts marquee events including Super Bowls, NCAA Final Fours, and the Sugar Bowl.
- Smoothie King Center: Located adjacent to the Superdome, this arena is home to the NBA’s New Orleans Pelicans. Opened in 1999, it is used for basketball games, concerts, and other large indoor events.
- Champions Square: A festival plaza and event space created in 2010 as part of post-Katrina revitalization efforts. It is used for tailgating, concerts, and public gatherings tied to events at the Superdome and Smoothie King Center.
- Alario Center: A multi-purpose facility in Westwego, Louisiana used for amateur sports, trade shows, graduations, and community events.
- Tennis Center at City Park: A regional tennis facility in New Orleans operated with support from the LSED, featuring over 20 courts and hosting youth and adult tournaments.

In addition to venues, the LSED manages related infrastructure including parking garages, administrative offices, and land parcels in the surrounding downtown sports and entertainment district. The district also facilitates naming rights agreements, long-term leases with teams, event hosting contracts, and collects dedicated hotel occupancy taxes and other fees as revenue sources.
