= David Dixon (businessman) =

American sports executive (1923–2010)

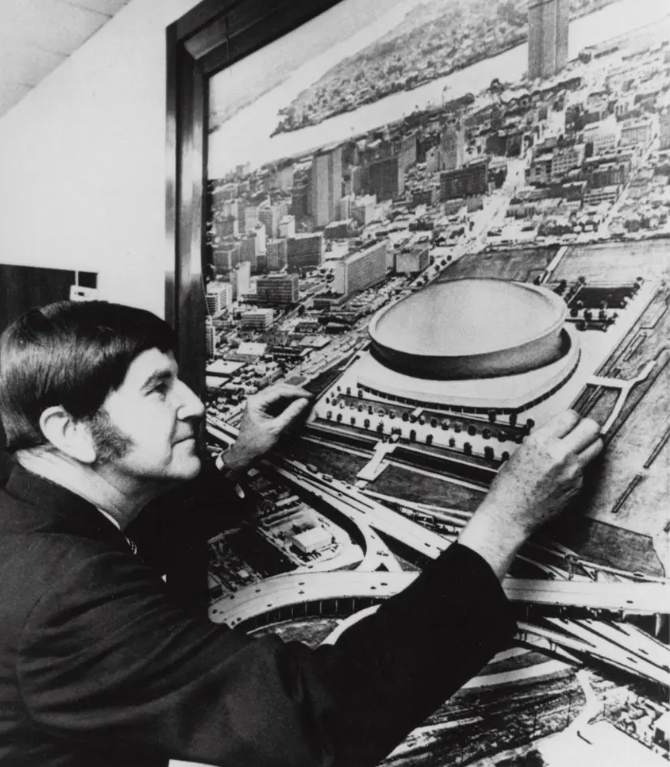
Dixon in 1971 with a Render Of The Superdome

David Frank Dixon (June 4, 1923 – August 8, 2010) was an American businessman and sports executive who helped create the New Orleans Saints NFL team, the Louisiana Superdome, World Championship Tennis (WCT) and the original version of the United States Football League (USFL).

== AFL expansion involvement ==
An alumnus of Tulane University, Dixon created the New Orleans Professional Football Club, Inc., to lobby for an NFL or an AFL franchise for that city starting in 1962.

In the 1961 season the Oakland Raiders finished 1–13, but several future Hall of Fame players were on that team. The owner decided to sell the team to Dixon for $236,000, and the team would have become the New Orleans Raiders; however, the mayor of Oakland interceded and helped put a group together and the team would remain in Oakland, eventually hiring a new coach who would quickly turn around the team's on-field fortunes.

After persuading the AFL to play its 1965 All-Star game in New Orleans, Dixon experienced a setback when black players encountered discrimination in the French Quarter. The AFL moved the game to Houston. Later in the year, Dixon first proposed a football league (also called the USFL) that would play its games in the spring rather than the fall. Dixon eventually used the formation of this league to persuade the NFL to expand into New Orleans, which is how the New Orleans Saints came into being on November 1, 1966.

== New Orleans Saints ==
On November 1, 1966, the efforts of Dixon and political figures such as Congressmen Hale Boggs and Governor John McKeithen paid off when the NFL awarded its 16th franchise to New Orleans. On November 8, after Dixon had persuaded McKeithen to endorse financing of a domed stadium, New Orleans voters approved funding to construct the Superdome. Dixon became a part owner of the Saints, which would be operated by John W. Mecom Jr., who won the bidding the following month. The team would begin play for the 1967 season. Dixon later relinquished his shares to become the executive director of the Superdome, which he oversaw for a number of years prior to the opening of the stadium in 1975. As part of his advocacy for the Superdome project, Dixon also played an instrumental role in the formation of the Louisiana Stadium and Exposition District (LSED), the public agency responsible for financing and managing the facility.

== World Championship Tennis (WCT) ==
In 1967, Dixon persuaded his friend and AFL founder Lamar Hunt to finance World Championship Tennis. After signing John Newcombe to a professional contract, Dixon persuaded Cliff Drysdale, Nikki Pilić, Roger Taylor, Tony Roche, Dennis Ralston, Pierre Barthès, and Butch Buchholz, seven of the world's ten best male tennis players, to turn pro within a few weeks. The US Open, the French Open, the Australian Open, and the Wimbledon Championships, formerly limited to amateur players, admitted professionals, and the popularity of the game grew dramatically. Remarkably, within ten years the leading money winner on the tennis pro tour was earning more money than the leading money winner on the pro golf tour.

== United States Football League ==
By 1980, Dixon was again proposing a pro football league that played its games in the spring and summer. On May 11, 1982, Dixon was able to announce the formation of the 12-team league to be known as the United States Football League, which played for three seasons from 1983 to 1985.

Dixon quickly became dismayed at his franchise owners' profligate spending, which did not fit the business model he envisioned for the USFL, and sold out his share in the league (a dormant franchise that would become the Houston Gamblers) in the 1983–84 offseason.

== Later career ==
After the USFL voted to switch to a fall schedule for 1986 (which would never come to pass), Dixon made several attempts to revive spring football. In 1985, he gave a speech at the Harvard Business School, proposing "America's Football Teams, Inc.", a professional league that would sell shares of stock as part of a ticket purchase. After the Fox Television Network was launched in 1987, Dixon proposed the "American Football Federation", which would have 10 teams and draft academically ineligible high school graduates. In 1996, Dixon announced the "FanOwnership Football League", whose teams would play from July to November and would sell 70 percent of their stock to the general public. None of Dixon's proposals got beyond the planning stages.

In 2008, he published an autobiography The Saints, The Superdome, and the Scandal: An Insider's Perspective.

Dixon died from complications from a fall he suffered at his home on August 8, 2010, at the age of 87.
