= Sir Saint =

Mascot for the NFL's New Orleans Saints

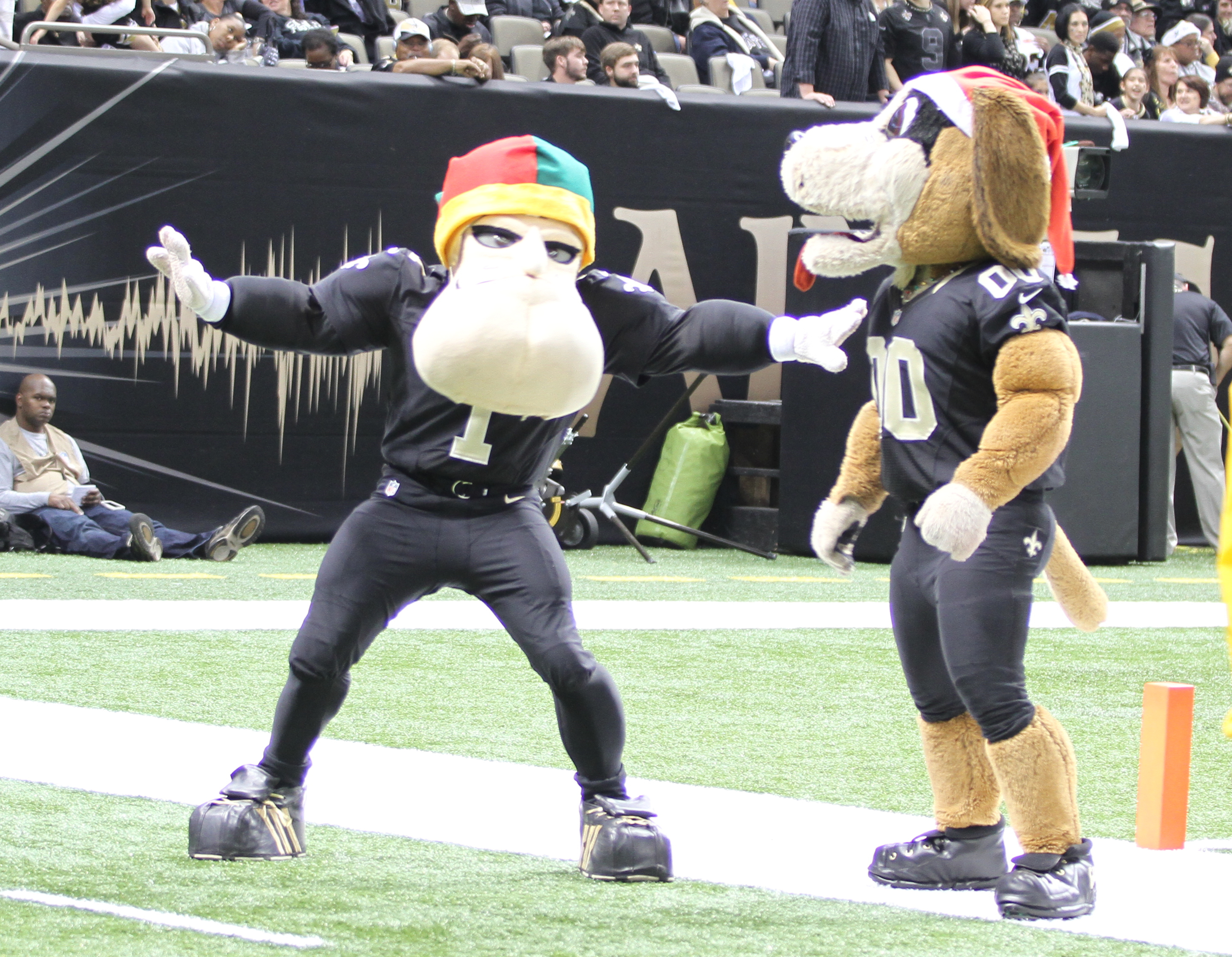
Sir Saint (left) Gumbo the Dog (right)

Sir Saint is the second official mascot of the NFL's New Orleans Saints, along with Gumbo the dog. Sir Saint is one of the original mascots of the Saints under former owner John Mecom Jr., and was revived by the organization after several decades of hiatus.

== Appearance ==
Sir Saint appears tall and fair-skinned, with an abnormally large chin, small eyes, and disproportionate feet dressed in a Saints uniform and helmet. He is commonly depicted smirking. He wears gold leggings.

In logo format, he stands facing a classic Saints shield to his right (on the viewer's left). The shield has three points at its top and one on the bottom, reading "SAINTS" with a black fleur-de-lis under the team name.

== History ==
The Sir Saint logo was first used from 1967 to 1984 along with the shield logo. Creator, Bill Guynes, served in the advertising department of the team where he brought the sketch to John Mecom Jr. In 2009, the same season as the Saints' Super Bowl championship, Sir Saint's image was revived and received widespread use, which is still prevalent today in merchandise and company promotion.
