= 1968 Louisiana gubernatorial election =

1967 Louisiana Democratic gubernatorial primary
- November 4, 1967
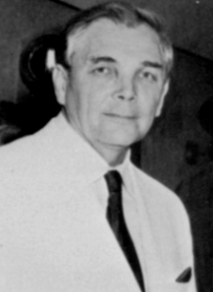

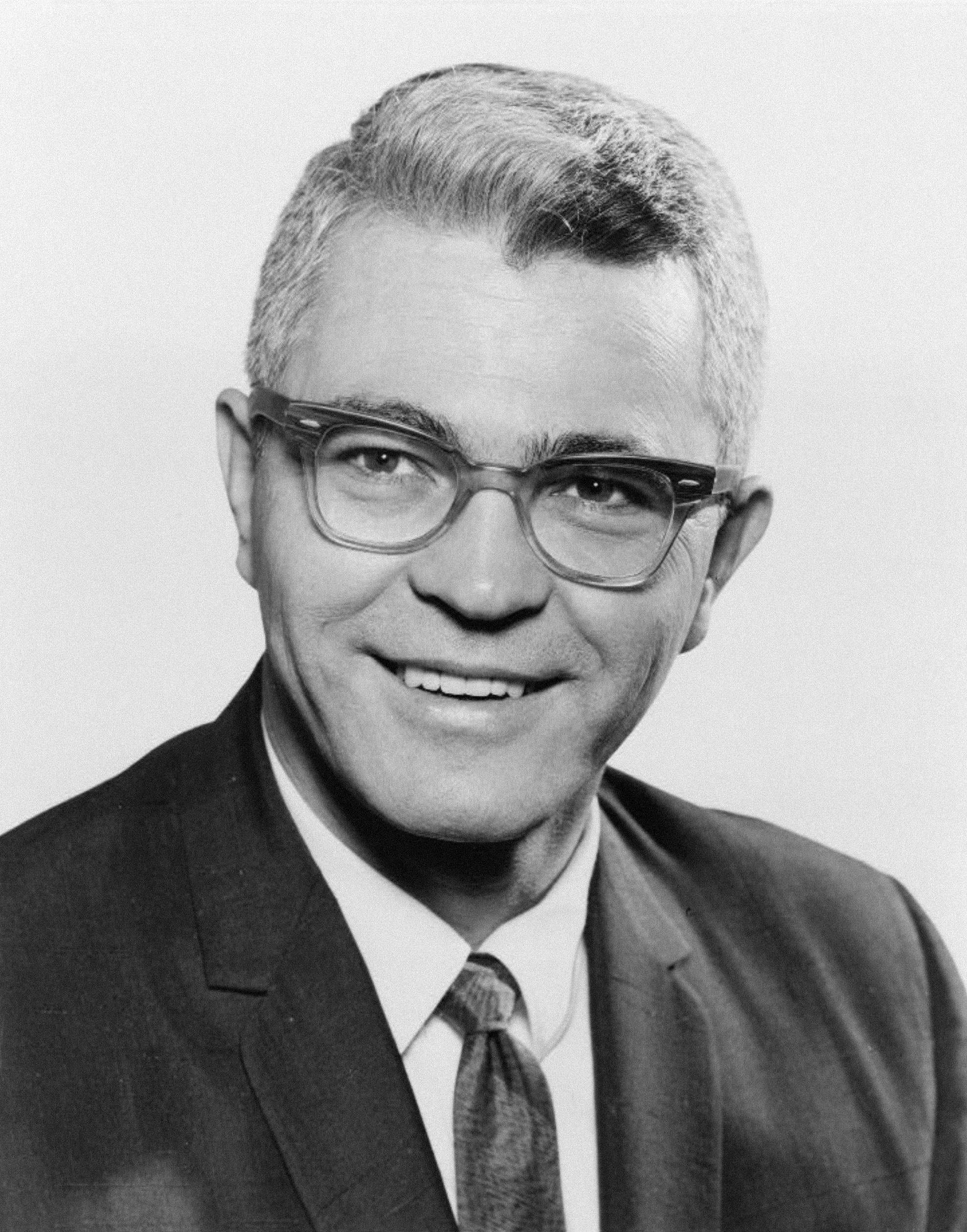
Candidate	John McKeithen	John Rarick
Party	Democratic	Democratic
Popular vote	836,304	179,846
Percentage	80.64%	17.34%
- Parish results McKeithen: 50–60% 60–70% 70–80% 80–90% >90%
Governor before election
John McKeithen
Democratic
Elected Governor
John McKeithen
Democratic

The 1968 Louisiana gubernatorial election was held on February 6, 1968. Incumbent Democratic governor John McKeithen was re-elected to a second term in office. This was the first election in which the governor was eligible for re-election to a second consecutive term, following a 1966 constitutional referendum. It was also the first election after the passage of the Voting Rights Act of 1965, which brought thousands of African Americans into the electorate for the first time.

The 1967 primary election resulted in the overwhelming re-nomination of John McKeithen to his second consecutive term as governor, the result of a constitutional amendment approved by voters in 1966, which allows Louisiana governors to serve two back-to-back terms.

On November 4, 1967, McKeithen won the Democratic primary with 80.64% of the vote. At this time the Louisiana Republican Party rarely fielded candidates (though they had in 1964), so the Democratic nomination was tantamount to victory. McKeithen won the general election without an opponent. As of 2023, this is the last time a Democratic candidate carried all 64 parishes.

== Democratic primary ==
=== Candidates ===
- Frank Ahern
- Cy D. F. Courtney
- John McKeithen, incumbent governor
- John Rarick, U.S. Representative from St. Francisville
- Addison Roswell Thompson, candidate for governor in 1960 and 1964

=== Results ===
1967 Democratic primary
Party	Candidate	Votes	%
Democratic	John McKeithen (incumbent)	836,304	80.64%
Democratic	John Rarick	179,846	17.34%
Democratic	Cy D. F. Courtney	8,698	0.84%
Democratic	Frank Joseph Ahern	7,152	0.69%
Democratic	Addison Roswell Thompson	5,102	0.49%
Total votes		1,037,102	100.00%

== General election ==
This is the most recent time to date that there was no Republican running in the contest for governor. Hence, John McKeithen was re-elected unopposed.

== Sources ==
Louisiana Secretary of State. Primary Election Returns, 1967
