= 1964 Louisiana gubernatorial election =

- March 3, 1964
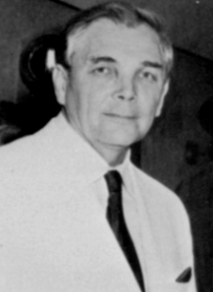

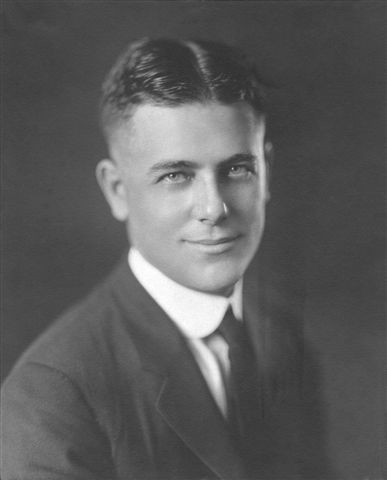
| Nominee | John McKeithen | Charlton Lyons |
| Party | Democratic | Republican |
| Popular vote | 469,589 | 297,753 |
| Percentage | 60.72% | 37.50% |
- Parish results McKeithen: 50–60% 60–70% 70–80% 80–90% >90% Lyons: 50–60% 70–80%
Governor before election
Jimmie Davis
Democratic
Elected Governor
John McKeithen
Democratic

The 1964 Louisiana gubernatorial election was held in the U.S. state on March 3, 1964. Democrat John McKeithen won a highly-competitive primary and dispatched Republican Charlton Lyons in the general election, though Lyons made a historically good showing for a Louisiana Republican up to this point.

The two Democratic Party primaries were held on December 7, 1963, and January 11. McKeithen defeated former mayor of New Orleans Chep Morrison in a runoff. This was Morrison's third failed run for governor.

== Democratic primary ==
=== Candidates ===
- Shelby M. Jackson, State Superintendent of Education
- Robert F. Kennon of Minden, former governor from 1952 to 1956
- Claude Kirkpatrick, State Public Works Director
- Hugh Lasseigne, Baton Rouge salesman
- Gillis William Long, U.S. Representative from Alexandria
- John McKeithen, Public Service Commissioner
- Louis J. Michot, State Representative from Lafayette
- Chep Morrison, candidate for governor in 1956 and 1960, former mayor of New Orleans, and former ambassador to the Organization of American States
- Wilford Thompson, resident of Zachary
- Addison Roswell Thompson, Ku Klux Klan wizard and perennial candidate

==== Withdrew ====
- Frank Voelker Jr., Lake Providence attorney and chairman of the Louisiana State Sovereignty Commission

=== Campaign ===
In the early days of the campaign, the conventional wisdom of political analysts was that the race would be a three-way contest between Morrison, Kennon, and Gillis Long.

As the campaign progressed, however, John McKeithen's standing in the polls rose rapidly. McKeithen, who had been a floor leader for the Longite faction in 1948, was endorsed by Earl Long's widow, Blanche Revere Long, who served as his campaign manager. He would later appoint her to a key department in his administration.

Gillis Long was endorsed by Senator Russell B. Long and was vying with McKeithen for the support of the Longite faction.

Kennon had the support of some business and industrial interests, as well as some segregationist voters.

Some observers theorized that the assassination of President John F. Kennedy, which occurred just days before the primary election, may have had a significant impact on the results. The assassination weakened Kennon's prospects because Kennon had in a televised address been highly critical of certain policies of both President Kennedy and Attorney General Robert F. Kennedy describing the Kennedy brothers as "young, misguided men." McKeithen had also criticized the Kennedys, describing both Gillis Long and Chep Morrison as "the Washington candidates." While it did not play as prominent role as in the 1959–60 campaign, race was an important issue in the primary. Jackson was the vocal segregationist among the five candidates, and Kennon discussed "state sovereignty", which some saw as a code word for segregation.

=== Results ===
Just as in his previous two gubernatorial elections, Morrison found the bulk of his support in New Orleans and South Louisiana. McKeithen's strong support in North Louisiana earned him a place in the runoff. Gillis Long did well in South Louisiana, but the presence of so many strong North Louisiana candidates denied him a significant base of support in that region.

The fifth-place candidate, Shelby Jackson, ran as a vocal segregationist. He drew conservative and segregationist votes from Kennon and therefore worked to deny Kennon the second spot in the runoff against Morrison. Even if half of Jackson's votes had otherwise gone to Kennon, then Kennon, and not McKeithen, would have faced the runoff with Morrison. Jackson's supporters were also believed in many cases to have been previous backers of the 1959 segregationist gubernatorial hopeful, William M. Rainach of Claiborne Parish.

1964 Democratic gubernatorial primary
| Party | Candidate | Votes | % |
|---|---|---|---|
| Democratic | deLesseps Morrison | 299,702 | 33.06% |
| Democratic | John McKeithen | 157,304 | 17.35% |
| Democratic | Gillis William Long | 137,778 | 15.20% |
| Democratic | Robert F. Kennon | 127,870 | 14.11% |
| Democratic | Shelby M. Jackson | 103,949 | 11.47% |
| Democratic | Louis J. Michot | 37,463 | 4.13% |
| Democratic | Claude Kirkpatrick | 28,578 | 3.15% |
| Democratic | Wilford Thompson | 6,454 | 0.71% |
| Democratic | Hugh Lasseigne | 4,034 | 0.45% |
| Democratic | Addison Roswell Thompson | 3,343 | 0.37% |
| Total votes | | 906,475 | 100.00% |

=== Run-off ===
==== Campaign ====
In the runoff, McKeithen echoed the racist tactics of former governor Jimmie Davis in the 1960 campaign, charging that Morrison was supported by an NAACP bloc vote. Portraying himself as a Southerner threatened by outside interests, asking the people of the state "Won't you he'p me?" He likewise borrowed Earl Long's criticisms of Morrison as a toupee-wearing city slicker out of touch with rural voters.

==== Results ====
McKeithen won 44 of 64 parishes, including every North Louisiana parish. Avoyelles was the most northerly parish to support Morrison. McKeithen's geographic support was strikingly similar to Jimmie Davis' in the 1960 runoff; he won every Davis parish except one.

In the race for lieutenant governor, C. C. Aycock, the incumbent, ran successfully as an "Independent" Democrat, meaning that he was allied with no gubernatorial candidate.

1964 Democratic gubernatorial runoff
| Party | Candidate | Votes | % |
|---|---|---|---|
| Democratic | John McKeithen | 492,905 | 52.21% |
| Democratic | deLesseps Morrison | 451,161 | 47.79% |
| Total votes | | 944,066 | 100.00% |

== General election ==
=== Results ===
McKeithen overcame the conservative Republican Charlton Lyons, a Shreveport oilman, in the first seriously contested Louisiana gubernatorial general election since Reconstruction. Lyons, who had been a Democrat since 1915, announced his party switch in a newspaper op-ed. He said he was "unalterably opposed to compulsory integration, and to other provisions of the Civil Rights plank of the 1960 Democratic Platform," and that it was "clear, I believe, that if the Democratic Program were carried into effect, the United States would become a Totalitarian Nation."

McKeithen defeated Lyons, 469,589 (60.7 percent) to 297,753 (37.5 percent); another 1.8 percent went to the States Rights Party nominee. McKeithen seemed bitter that he had to face a strong Republican candidate after struggling through two hard-fought Democratic primaries.

No Republican ran for lieutenant governor against Aycock.

| Candidate | Party | Votes received | Percent |
|---|---|---|---|
| John McKeithen | Democrat | 469,589 | 60.72% |
| Charlton Lyons | Republican | 297,753 | 37.50% |
| Thomas S. Williams | States' Rights Party of Louisiana | 6048 | 1.78% |
| Total | | 773,390 | |

== Analysis ==
From Reconstruction until the 1964 election, Louisiana's Republican Party had been virtually nonexistent in terms of electoral support. This meant that the two Democratic Party primaries were generally the real contest over who would be governor. In this election, however, the Republican made an unprecedented strong showing in the general election, winning 37.5% of the vote.

== Sources ==
- Louisiana Secretary of State. Primary Election Returns, 1960, 1964
- Howard, Perry H. Political Tendencies in Louisiana. LSU Press, 1971.
- Jeansonne, Glenn. "DeLesseps Morrison: Why He Couldn't Become Governor of Louisiana." Louisiana History 14, 1973.
- Public Affairs Research Council of Louisiana, executive director Edward J. Steimel. Voter's Guide to the 1963–1964 Elections
