= Waterford, Indiana =

- Unincorporated community
- Location within Indiana Location within the United States
- Coordinates: 41°40′17″N 86°50′42″W
- Country: United States
- State: Indiana
- County: LaPorte
- Township: Coolspring
- Elevation: 643 ft (196 m)
- ZIP code: 46360
- FIPS code: 18-81242
- GNIS feature ID: 445536

Waterford is an unincorporated community in Coolspring Township, LaPorte County, Indiana, United States.

== History ==
A post office was located in Waterford between 1850 and 1900. The community grew around a gristmill.

== Notable people ==
- John Rarick – U.S. Representative (1924–2009) from Louisiana was born in Waterford.
