= Coolspring Township, LaPorte County, Indiana =

Coolspring Township
- Township
- Coordinates: 41°39′17″N 86°52′23″W
- Country: United States
- State: Indiana
- County: LaPorte

Government
  - Type: Indiana township

Area
  - Total: 36.1 sq mi (93 km^{2})
  - Land: 35.97 sq mi (93.2 km^{2})
  - Water: 0.14 sq mi (0.36 km^{2})
- Elevation: 653 ft (199 m)

Population (2020)
  - Total: 15,684
  - Density: 409.2/sq mi (158.0/km^{2})
- FIPS code: 18-15040
- GNIS feature ID: 453247

Coolspring Township is one of twenty-one townships in LaPorte County, Indiana. As of the 2020 census, its population was 15,684 (up from 14,718 at 2010) and it contained 7,302 housing units.

Coolspring Township was established in 1836.

== Geography ==
According to the 2010 census, the township has a total area of 36.1 square miles (93 km^{2}), of which 35.97 square miles (93.2 km^{2}) (or 99.64%) is land and 0.14 square miles (0.36 km^{2}) (or 0.39%) is water.

The headwaters of the Little Calumet River is located within Coolspring Township, at Red Mill County Park.

The unincorporated town of Waterford is located within the township.
