= John W. Mecom Sr. =

American businessman (1911–1981)

John Whitfield Mecom Sr.
- Born: John Whitfield Mecom; January 13, 1911; Liberty, Texas, U.S.
- Died: October 12, 1981 (aged 70); Houston, Texas, U.S.
- Occupation: Independent oilman
- Spouse: Mary Elizabeth (d. 1996)
- Children: John W. Mecom Jr.

John Whitfield Mecom Sr. (January 13, 1911 – October 12, 1981), was an American independent oilman.

Mecom acquired abandoned oil wells and made them profitable. He developed new fields from Louisiana to Saudi Arabia.

He was once ranked as one of the top oil independents; however, he filed for bankruptcy in 1970. After reorganizing his John W. Mecom Company, he reopened his company, which he subsequently operated with his son, John W. Mecom Jr., former owner of the New Orleans Saints NFL football team.

On December 18, 1964, a C82 Packet owned by Mecom was shot down by the Egyptian air force, killing both pilot and co-pilot after failing to log a flight plan and failing to land at Alexandria after repeated requests. (see FAA report which blames Mecom's pilot). The incident strained U.S.-Egypt relations, Mecom being a friend and donor of U.S. President Lyndon B. Johnson. The Egyptian government said that the plane was shot down by its MiG fighter jets after ignoring a repeated warning to land. Mecom was not on the plane which was on a routine trip to purchase drilling detergent for his oil business.

In December 1965, Mecom offered to buy the Houston Chronicle, its building, the Rice Hotel and a 35 percent interest in Texas Commerce National Bank from Houston Endowment Inc. The offer included a down payment of one million dollars. However, Mecom was unable to raise the additional cash to complete the sale and canceled the transaction.

In the 1960s, Mecom partnered with Patrick F. Taylor, who held a degree in petroleum engineering from Louisiana State University. In 1974, the two started the Circle Bar Drilling Company, which they sold in 1979. Taylor then established his own oil company in New Orleans, Louisiana, and subsequently became known as an educational philanthropist.

John Mecom owned and raced Thoroughbreds which included Narushua that finished 11th in the 1965 Kentucky Derby and the multiple stakes-winning gelding Rushing Man that finished 14th in the 1975 Kentucky Derby.
