= John Rarick =

American lawyer, jurist and veteran (1924–2009)

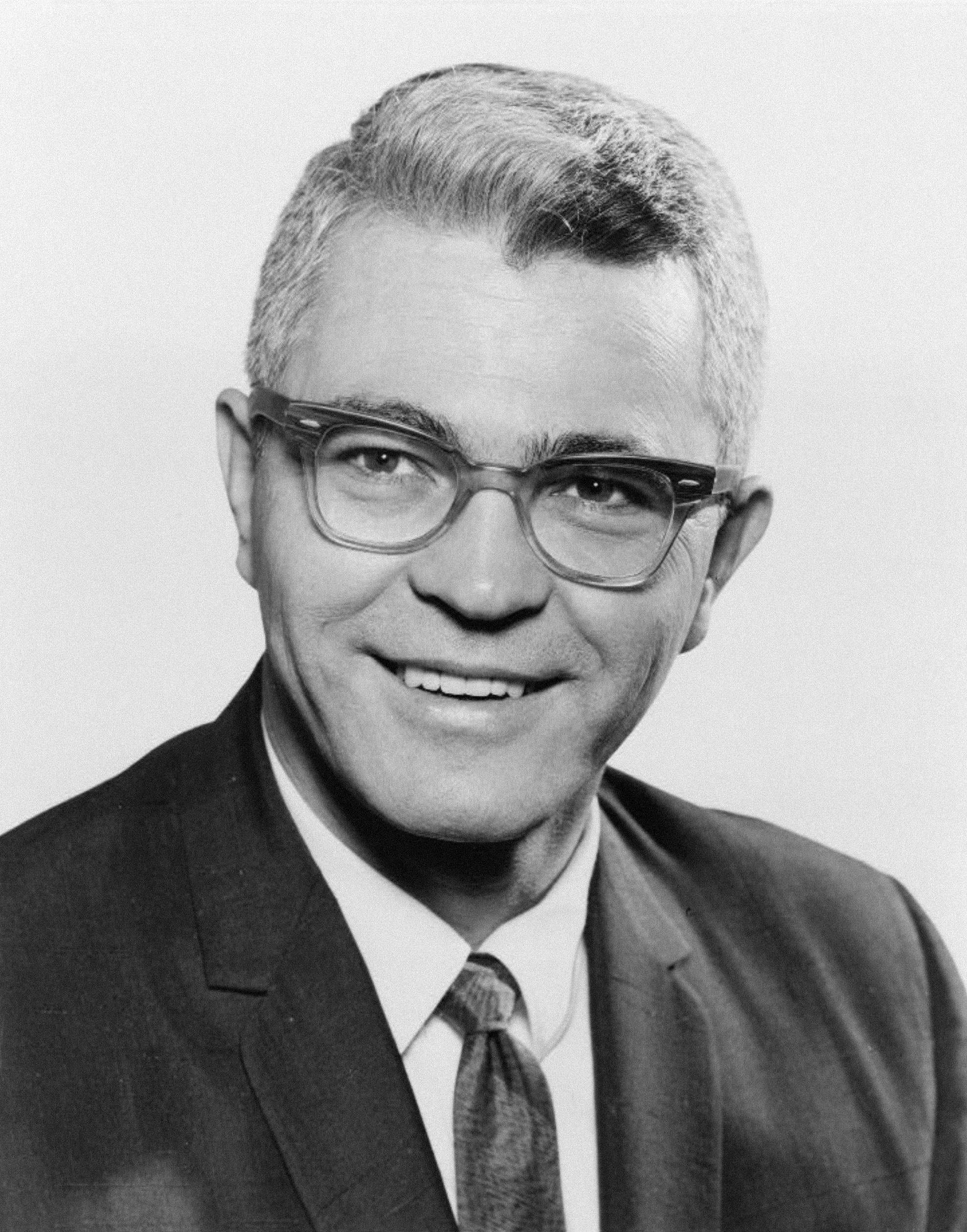
- Rarick in 1966

Member of the U.S. House of Representatives from Louisiana's 6th district
- In office January 3, 1967 – January 3, 1975
- Preceded by: James H. Morrison
- Succeeded by: Henson Moore

Personal details
- Born: John Richard Rarick; January 29, 1924 Waterford, Indiana, U.S.
- Died: September 14, 2009 (aged 85) St. Francisville, Louisiana, U.S.
- Party: Democratic
- Other political affiliations: American Independent Party (1980)
- Education: Louisiana State University; Tulane University School of Law
- Occupation: Attorney; Judge

John Richard Rarick (January 29, 1924 – September 14, 2009) was an American politician, lawyer, jurist, and World War II veteran who served four terms in the U.S. House of Representatives, serving Louisiana's 6th congressional district from 1967 to 1975. He was a Democrat.

== Early life and career ==
John Rarick was born in Waterford, Indiana on January 29, 1924, to Mae Caroline (Clover) and Merl Rarick. He attended Goshen High School before enlisting in the Army. As a cadet, he was stationed at barracks that had been set up at Louisiana State University in Baton Rouge.

=== World War II ===
During World War II, Rarick fought in the Battle of the Bulge, where he was captured by the Germans and held as a prisoner of war. In recognition of his service during the war, Rarick was awarded the Bronze Star and earned a Purple Heart.

=== After the war ===
After the war, he returned to Louisiana and enrolled at LSU. After graduation, he attended Tulane University School of Law, where he earned his Juris Doctor in 1949. He passed the Louisiana bar exam and began a private practice in Louisiana.

In 1961, he was elected district judge in Louisiana's Twentieth Judicial District. He served in that capacity until May 15, 1966, when he resigned to run for Congress.

When Rarick was a state judge, attorney Lolis Elie, who was African-American, recalled meeting Rarick in a courtroom, and Rarick responding: "I didn't know they let you coons practice law."

== United States Congress ==
=== 1966 election ===
Rarick announced his campaign for Congress in Louisiana's 6th congressional district in response to the perceived racial moderation of incumbent 6th district Democratic Congressman James Morrison. Morrison had voted for the Voting Rights Act of 1965, like fellow Louisianan and House Majority Leader Hale Boggs but unlike the rest of the Louisiana delegation. Rarick's campaign sought to cast Morrison as a rubber-stamp for President Lyndon B. Johnson, who had become unpopular with Southern conservative Democrats. Morrison portrayed Rarick as a carpetbagger from Indiana who was a member of the Ku Klux Klan; Rarick denied the allegations of being a Klansman while taking pains not to criticize the group or its methods.

In 1962, Rarick served on the board of directors for the Citizens' Council of Louisiana.

Despite the attacks, in the first round of the Democratic primary, Morrison fell 1,880 votes shy of an outright victory; over 6,000 votes were cast for another candidate named James E. Morrison, which observers suspected had been meant for the incumbent Congressman.

In the runoff, Morrison tried to justify his support for universal suffrage while highlighting his opposition to other civil rights bills, while Rarick highlighted his military record and attacked Morrison's as a supporter of LBJ's War on Poverty social welfare programs, which were unpopular in southeastern Louisiana.

Ultimately, Rarick defeated Morrison in the primary runoff, winning 51.2% of the vote. This was tantamount to election in the heavily Democratic South, and he easily defeated Republican nominee Crayton G. Hall in the general election.

=== Tenure in Congress ===
Rarick was first elected to the 90th U.S. Congress, representing the 6th Congressional District. He won re-election in 1968, 1970, and 1972.

During his time in Congress, Rarick gained a reputation for racially-tinged rhetoric, frequently inserting into the Congressional Record criticisms and personal attacks directed at Black and Jewish leaders of the day, including Supreme Court Justice Thurgood Marshall and civil rights icon Martin Luther King Jr.

In 1972, Congressman Charles Diggs of Detroit called Rarick "the leading racist in Congress" after Rarick testified against a committee measure providing Washington, D.C. self-governing home rule. Rarick had testified that groups such as the "Black Muslims" could gain control of Washington, D.C. should the city be allowed to govern itself.

In 1967, he made an unsuccessful run for governor of Louisiana, losing to incumbent Democrat John McKeithen by a wide margin.

=== 1974 election ===
Running for re-election to a fifth term, Rarick was defeated in the 1974 Democratic primary by 29-year old challenger Jeff LaCaze. Rarick's defeat created an opportunity for Republican candidate Henson Moore, who beat LaCaze by 44 votes in the November general election. The election was ordered to be rerun by court order, with Moore defeating LaCaze by a 54% to 46% margin in the rerun.

== Later career ==
After leaving office, Rarick returned to Louisiana, resuming the practice of law and becoming involved in local community causes.

He unsuccessfully ran for election to his former congressional seat as an independent candidate in 1976. He also ran unsuccessfully for president in 1980 under the label of the American Independent Party.

Rarick supported David Duke, former Grand Wizard of the Knights of the Ku Klux Klan, during his campaign in the 1991 Louisiana gubernatorial election. Rarick spoke at several Duke campaign rallies around the state.

== Death ==
John Rarick died in St. Francisville, Louisiana on September 14, 2009, at the age of 85. He was preceded in death by his first wife, Marguerite Pierce Rarick. He was survived by his second wife, Frances Eldred Campbell Rarick, as well as his three children.

U.S. House of Representatives
Preceded by James H. Morrison	Member of the U.S. House of Representatives from Louisiana's 6th congressional district 1967–1975	Succeeded by Henson Moore
Party political offices
Preceded by Lester G. Maddox	American Independent Party nominee for President of the United States; 1980	Succeeded by Bob Richards
