= Gumbo (mascot) =

Mascot for the NFL's New Orleans Saints

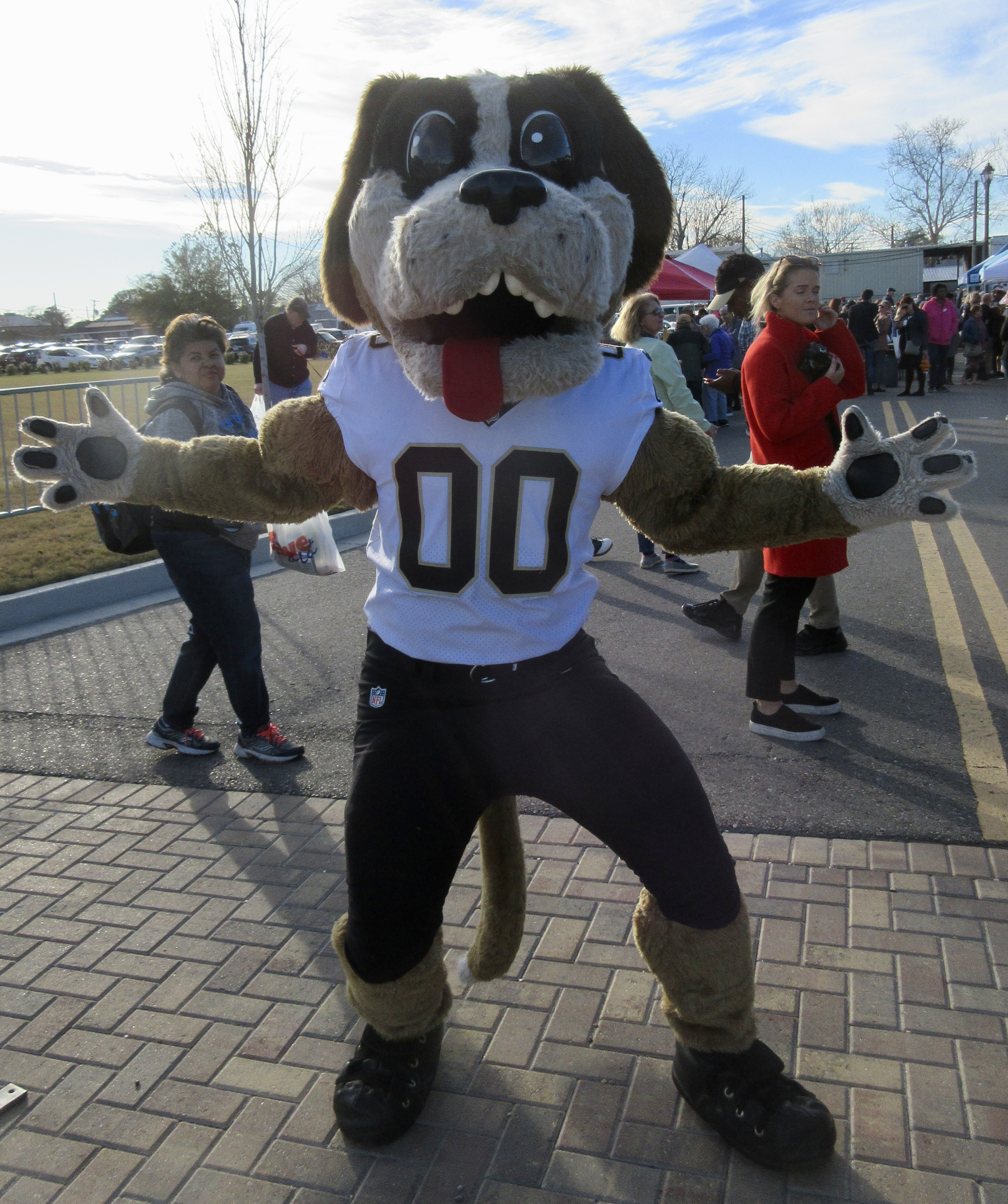
"Gumbo" in January 2019

Gumbo the Dog is one of two official mascots of the NFL's New Orleans Saints alongside Sir Saint.

== Description and history ==
Gumbo is an anthropomorphic Saint Bernard dog who wears a Saints jersey bearing the number 00, as well as black pants and shoes. It was the Louisiana Restaurant Association's gift to the Saints. From the New Orleans Saints' website:

"It was a natural evolution of this idea that the dog be a Saint Bernard, and the name, Gumbo (a conglomeration of food and an iconic New Orleanian dish), reflects the Restaurant Association as well as a famous traditional Cajun meal loved by young and old, rich and poor (a mix like all people who love and support the Saints)."

Even though Gumbo went into a brief retirement, he was brought back by popular demand, replacing a short lived Phillie Phanatic-like jester mascot known as Mambo who was the team's secondary official mascot during the early 2000s.

For years, Gumbo was, in fact, a real Saint Bernard dog that roamed the sidelines in Saints' apparel for dogs. The reason for choosing this breed of dog is the fact that Orleans Parish (where the City of New Orleans lies) shares a border with St. Bernard Parish to the east. The present mascot, which consists of a person wearing a Saint Bernard dog head and a football uniform, is usually seen on the sidelines during games near the goalpost and sometimes celebrates touchdowns with Saints players.
