= John W. Mecom Jr. =

American businessman and sports executive

John Whitfield Mecom Jr.
- Born: John Whitfield Mecom, Jr. October 11, 1939 (age 87); Houston, Texas, U.S.
- Occupations: Businessman, sports executive
- Spouse: Patsy Mullendore Whittenburg (m. 1961; div. 1998)
- Children: 4 with Whittenburg
- Parent(s): John W. Mecom, Sr. Mary Elizabeth Mecom

John W. Mecom Jr. (born October 11, 1939) is the chairman of the John W. Mecom company and founder of the New Orleans Saints NFL football team.

== Early life ==
Mecom is the son of Texas oilman John W. Mecom Sr. and his wife Mary Elizabeth. He was a student at the University of Oklahoma.

He is the owner and chairman of the John W. Mecom company, which was started by his father. The company is primarily involved in real estate and the oil and gas industry.

John, Jr. followed with his own achievements in the oil and gas industry, and in various real estate ventures. He also branched out into professional sports with a special interest in motorsport and football. In the early 1960s he formed his own racing team, Mecom Racing that successfully competed throughout the U.S. and had such drivers as Roger Penske, Pedro Rodriguez, AJ Foyt and Jackie Stewart. Graham Hill raced his car to victory at the 1966 Indianapolis 500.

== Sports ownership ==
On November 1, 1966, the National Football League awarded a team to the city of New Orleans, Louisiana, as spearheaded by businessmen such as David Dixon and politicians such as Congressmen Hale Boggs and Governor John McKeithen, which would play in the 1967 season. William G. Helis Jr., Herman Lay, Louis J. Roussel Jr., Jack Sanders, Edgar B. Stern Jr., and John W. Mecom Jr. were the six bidders for the franchise. On December 15, 1966, Mecom was the winning bid, purchasing the team for $8.5 million from the NFL and became the youngest owner of an NFL franchise. Soon christened as the New Orleans Saints, Mecom spearheaded the black and gold color scheme that the Saints would wear (Dixon had pushed for Mardi Gras colors), which came after testing at Tulane Stadium. (The shade of gold used was made darker as to distinguish themselves from the Pittsburgh Steelers, who use a lighter shade of gold that more closely resembled yellow.) Tulane Stadium would serve as the first home of the Saints until the Superdome was built, which did not end up being completed until 1975, three years late and $120 million over budget.

In eighteen seasons as owner, the Saints went 78–176–5, with only 1979 and 1983 seeing the team win more than seven games. Owing to his inexperience, Mecom attempted to remedy the team's perpetual troubles with the advice from anyone he could ask, such as the league or the media, which only made things worse. The 1980 team lost fourteen games to start the year, and fans started to wear paper bags over their heads with "Aints" on it before one idea to respond to the team "laying an egg" saw the team building and Mecom's apartment bombarded with eggs for a week.

In late 1984, he announced that the team was up for sale. Mecom stated that talks about potentially leaving New Orleans only happened when state Governor Edwin Edwards did not want to negotiate a new lease with the team. Cities included in the rumor mill were Indianapolis, Indiana (which was quickly ruled out once the Baltimore Colts moved there themselves on March 29, 1984), Phoenix, Arizona (which received the Cardinals from St. Louis in 1988) and Jacksonville, Florida. Jacksonville (where the expansion Jaguars began play in 1995) made an offer to buy 49% for over $110 million, but Mecom did not wish to be the man known for moving the Saints out of New Orleans (which lost the NBA's Jazz, who also played in the Superdome, to Salt Lake City. in 1979). Abram Nicholas Pritzker was considered as a potential buyer but attempts to bring in a partner in George Gillette Jr (who had tried to buy the team with Potter Palmer in 1973 with bitter results) led to the talks breaking off. On May 31, 1985, he sold the team for $64 million to New Orleans-native businessman Tom Benson (as encouraged by Edwards). Known for not having a winning record their first 20 years, the Saints on-field performance improved almost overnight in the years following Mecom's sale to Benson.

Mecom dealt with a bout of cancer in 2007 that lasted a number of years while living in Houston. When interviewed for the Saints Super Bowl run almost 25 years since his sale of the team (where Mecom attended the NFC Championship Game in the Superdome), Mecom expressed that ownership "wasn't a place for a romantic" while saying he had fun and learned life lessons as owner.

Sporting positions
First	New Orleans Saints owner 1966–1985	Succeeded by Tom Benson
