= John McKeithen =

American politician (1918–1999)

49th Governor of Louisiana
- In office May 12, 1964 – May 9, 1972
- Lieutenant: Taddy Aycock
- Preceded by: Jimmie Davis
- Succeeded by: Edwin Edwards

Personal details
- Born: May 28, 1918 Grayson, Louisiana, U.S.
- Died: June 4, 1999 (aged 81) Columbia, Louisiana, U.S.
- Party: Democratic
- Other political affiliations: Independent (1972)
- Spouse: Marjorie Funderburk
- Children: 6, including Fox
- Education: Louisiana State University

Military service
- Allegiance: United States
- Branch/service: United States Army
- Years of service: 1942 - 1946
- Rank: First Lieutenant
- Unit: 77th Infantry Division
- Battles/wars: World War II

John Julian McKeithen (May 28, 1918 – June 4, 1999) was an American lawyer and politician who served as the 49th governor of Louisiana from 1964 to 1972. A populist Democrat, McKeithen was the first Louisiana governor in the 20th century to win consecutive terms after a constitutional amendment allowed re-election. His administration is best known for overseeing the beginnings of school integration, controversial payments to the Ku Klux Klan, and the launch of large-scale infrastructure projects, including the establishment of the Louisiana Stadium and Exposition District and the initial development of the Louisiana Superdome, which became one of the most iconic sports venues in the United States.

According to one observer, McKeithen projected “three contradictory images-those of reformer, progressive Longite, and segregationist.”

== Early life ==
McKeithen was born in Grayson, Louisiana on May 28, 1918, to Jesse J. McKeithen and DeEtte Eglin, a farming family in Caldwell Parish. He attended High Point College and later transferred to Louisiana State University where he received his law degree in 1942. He married Marjorie Howell Funderburk that same year with whom he had six children, including Walter Fox McKeithen, who served five terms as Louisiana Secretary of State.

During World War II, McKeithen served as a U.S. Army first lieutenant in the 77th Infantry Division. He saw combat action across the Pacific Theater, serving honorably in the battles of Guam, Leyte, and Okinawa. For his actions during the Battle of Okinawa, he was awarded the Bronze Star. After the war, he settled in Columbia, Louisiana and set up a law practice.

== Political career ==
=== 1948–1963 ===
McKeithen was elected to the Louisiana House of Representatives in 1948. Governor Earl K. Long appointed him as floor leader despite his lack of experience and low profile. He lost the race for the Democratic nomination for lieutenant governor in 1952, and in 1954 was elected to the Louisiana Public Service Commission.

=== First term as governor ===
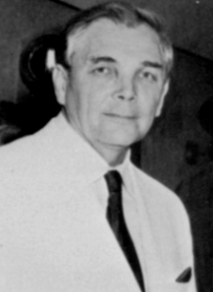
McKeithen as governor.

McKeithen entered the 1963 Democratic primary for Governor of Louisiana. He ran as a populist, running direct-to-camera commercials with a signature catchphrase of "Won't you he'p me?" As was typical for Southern Democrats, he ran as a segregationist, insinuating that his chief rival (New Orleans mayor deLesseps Story Morrison) was an integrationist supported by the NAACP. McKeithen won the Democratic nomination, which in the Deep South at the time was tantamount to election, and defeated the Republican candidate Charlton Lyons in the 1964 general election.

McKeithen's first term saw the construction of the Louisiana Superdome, reforms to the state code of ethics, and the Civil Rights Movement.

Shortly after McKeithen's election, he began sending secret payments through the Louisiana State Sovereignty Commission to the Ku Klux Klan leadership, in an attempt to "buy peace" and suppress Klan violence. In one incident, a confident of McKeithen's was sent to Bogalusa with $10,000 in cash to be split equally between local Klan leaders and the local chapter of Deacons for Defense and Justice. These payments by McKeithen were discovered through declassified FBI records in 2016, through the Freedom of Information Act.

Despite his running as a segregationist in 1963, he oversaw the beginning of school integration in Louisiana, and called out the Louisiana National Guard to protect civil rights activists marching from Bogalusa to Baton Rouge. In a speech to a Black audience in 1966, he said regarding integration: "I know I’m not leaving this state, and I don’t think you’re leaving either. So we’ve got to solve our problem."

McKeithen was popular in his first term, and successfully engineered the passage of a constitutional referendum that allowed governors to run for re-election, the first time this had been allowed in Louisiana in the 20th century. He also helped to engineer a referendum for a domed stadium in New Orleans, with the approval (by a margin of roughly 3-to-1) being key in the formation of the first professional team in the state in the New Orleans Saints to begin play in 1967. The initial forecast was for $35 million, complete with financing by a hotel-motel tax of 4% in the city and neighboring Jefferson Parish that would not rely on credit from the state. However, the figure doubled in the ensuing years to the point where (due to factors cited by McKeithen as inflation and rising construction costs) that had to see McKeithen sign a lease between the stadium (as chaired by him) and the state that would see the state rental take form in making up any deficits incurred by the stadium. The Louisiana Superdome eventually opened in 1975.

=== Second term as governor ===
McKeithen defeated Congressman John Rarick by a wide margin in the 1967 Democratic primary for Governor and was elected unopposed in the 1968 general election.

During his second term, a series of articles in Life magazine alleged that he was connected to the New Orleans mafia, though he was never charged. In 1979 Carlos Marcello was recorded by the FBI venting that although he gave McKeithen $168,000, Louisianan politicians "take your fuckin' money, man, and then they tell you goodbye...I had McKeithen for eight years...then that son of a bitch too scared to talk to me". As one of his last acts as governor in 1964, Jimmie Davis approved a plan for the building of a levee at Marcello's property Churchill Farms. The contract stipulated that the state would put up $500,000 for its construction. In 1967 Davis' successor McKeithen approved the issuance of the check. When Life magazine exposed the contract McKeithen denied that he had ever issued a check. Previously in 1964 McKeithen had appointed Frances Pecora, wife of Marcello associate Nofio Pecora, as Chairman of the Fire Insurance Rating Division of the Louisiana Insurance Rating Commission.

== Later life and death ==
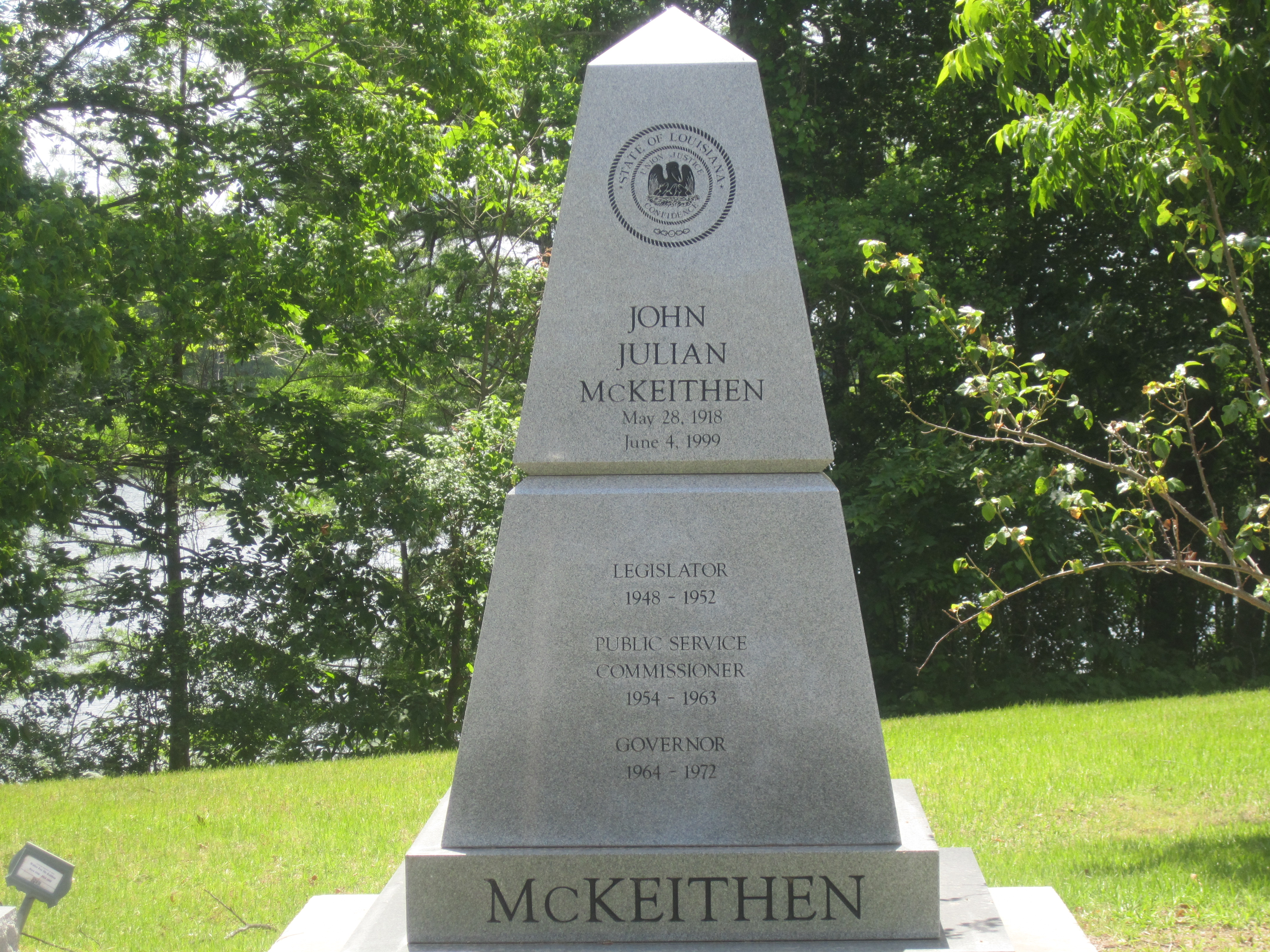
John McKeithen monument in Caldwell Parish, Louisiana.

After the completion of his second term, McKeithen retired to his farm in Columbia, Louisiana and continued to practice law. He managed an oil and gas company and was appointed to the Board of Supervisors of Louisiana State University in 1983.

McKeithen underwent heart surgery in 1997, after which his health declined. On June 4, 1999, McKeithen died at the age of 81 in Columbia.

Party political offices
Preceded by Jimmie Davis	Democratic nominee for Governor of Louisiana; 1964, 1968	Succeeded by Edwin Edwards
Louisiana House of Representatives
Preceded by V. E. Claunch	Louisiana State Representative for Caldwell Parish; 1948–1952	Succeeded by Johnnie W. Calton
Political offices
Preceded by Harvey Broyles	Louisiana Public Service Commissioner for the former District 3 (North Louisiana); 1955–1964	Succeeded by John S. Hunt, II
Preceded by Jimmie Davis	Governor of Louisiana; May 12, 1964–May 9, 1972	Succeeded by Edwin Edwards
