= New Orleans Saints =

NFL team in New Orleans, Louisiana

- Current season
| Logo | Wordmark |
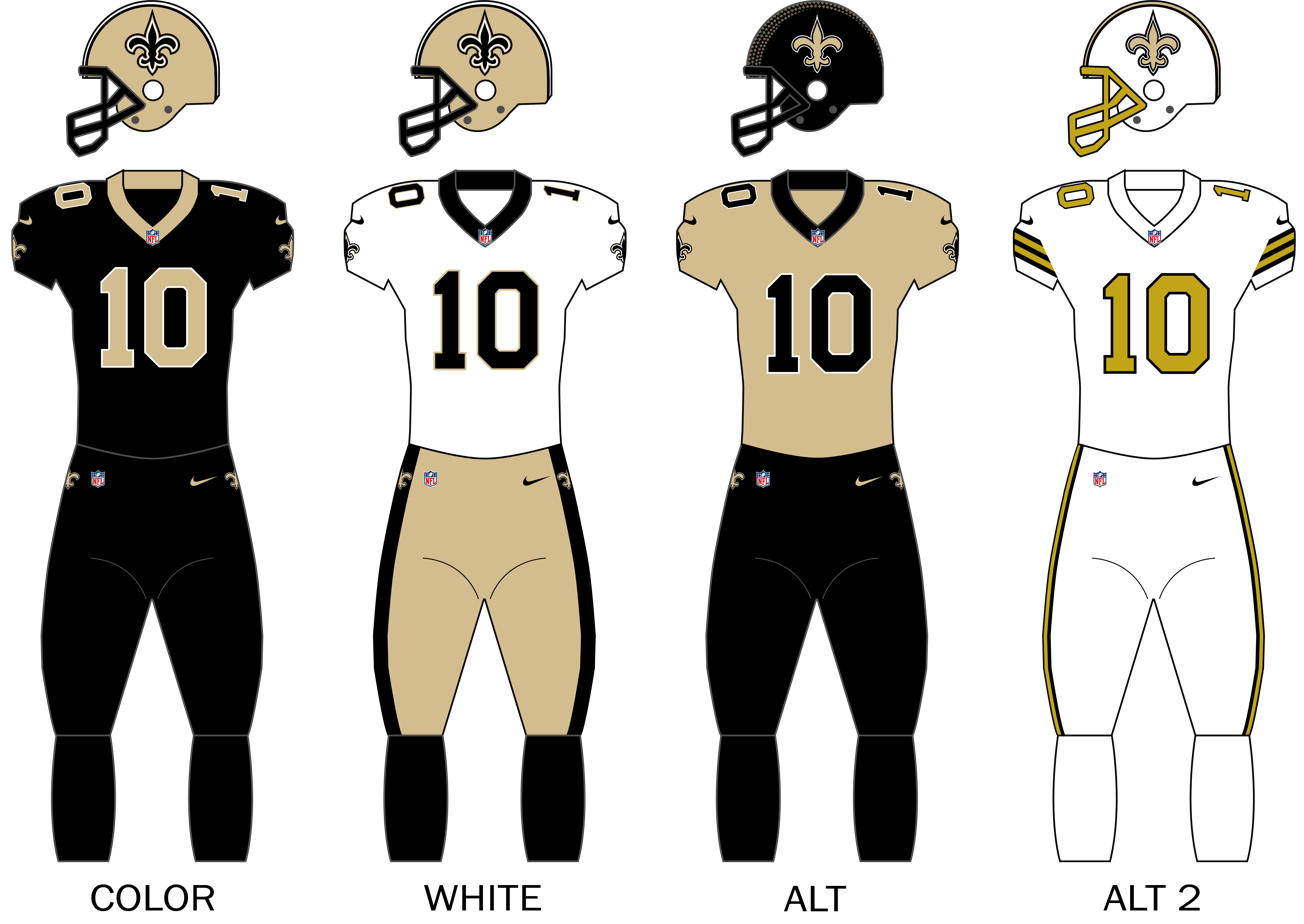
- Uniforms

General information
- Founded: November 1, 1966; 60 years ago
- Stadium: Caesars Superdome; New Orleans, Louisiana
- Headquartered: Ochsner Sports Performance Center; Metairie, Louisiana
- Colors: Old gold, black, white
- Fight song: "When the Saints Go Marching In"
- Mascot: Gumbo, Sir Saint
- Website: neworleanssaints.com

Personnel
- Owner: Gayle Benson
- General manager: Mickey Loomis
- Head coach: Kellen Moore
- President: Dennis Lauscha

Nicknames
- The Black and Gold; The Dome Patrol; The Bless You Boys; The Who Dats; The Aints

Team history
- New Orleans Saints (1967–present)

Home fields
- Tulane Stadium (1967–1974); Caesars Superdome (1975–2004, 2006–present); Temporary stadiums 2005 due to the effects of Hurricane Katrina: Tiger Stadium (four games); Alamodome (three games); Giants Stadium (one game); 2021 due to the effect of Hurricane Ida: TIAA Bank Field (one game)

League / conference affiliations
- National Football League (1967–present): Eastern Conference (1967–1969); Capitol Division (1967; 1969); Century Division (1968); National Football Conference (1970–present); NFC West (1970–2001); NFC South (2002–present)

Championships
- Super Bowl championships: 1 2009 (XLIV)
- Conference championships: 1: NFC: 2009
- Division championships: 9: NFC West: 1991, 2000; NFC South: 2006, 2009, 2011, 2017, 2018, 2019, 2020

Playoff appearances (14)
- NFL: 1987, 1990, 1991, 1992, 2000, 2006, 2009, 2010, 2011, 2013, 2017, 2018, 2019, 2020

Owners
- John W. Mecom Jr. (1966–1985); Tom Benson (1985–2018); Gayle Benson (2018–present)

The New Orleans Saints are a professional American football team based in New Orleans. The Saints compete in the National Football League (NFL) as a member of the National Football Conference (NFC) South division. Since 1975, the team plays its home games at Caesars Superdome after using Tulane Stadium during its first eight seasons. Founded by John W. Mecom Jr., David Dixon, and the city of New Orleans on November 1, 1966, the Saints joined the NFL as an expansion team in 1967.

The Saints were among the NFL's least successful franchises in their first several decades, where they went 20 consecutive seasons without a winning record or qualifying for the playoffs. They earned their first winning record and postseason berth in 1987, while their first playoff win would not occur until 2000, the team's 34th season. The team's fortunes improved in the 21st century, especially during the late 2000s and 2010s, which saw them become more consistent postseason contenders. Their greatest success to date came in the 2009 season, when they won Super Bowl XLIV in their only Super Bowl appearance. The Saints are one of two NFL franchises, along with the New York Jets, to win their sole Super Bowl appearance.

== History ==
=== Early history ===
Local sports entrepreneur Dave Dixon and a local civic group had been seeking an NFL franchise for over five years and had hosted record crowds for NFL exhibition games. To seal the NFL–AFL merger, NFL Commissioner Pete Rozelle arrived in New Orleans within a week, and announced on November 1, 1966, that the NFL officially had awarded the city of New Orleans an expansion franchise. The team was named for "When the Saints Go Marching In", the classic jazz standard associated with New Orleans. When the deal was reached a week earlier, Dixon strongly suggested to Rozelle that the announcement be delayed until November 1, to coincide with All Saints' Day. Dixon cleared the name with New Orleans' Archbishop Philip M. Hannan, who "thought it would be a good idea," according to Dixon. "He had an idea the team was going to need all the help it could get."

=== John Mecom Jr. era (1967–1984) ===
U.S. House Majority Whip from Louisiana Hale Boggs attached the merger to a bill approving an exemption from antitrust sanctions allowing for the merger and the team. John W. Mecom Jr., a young oilman from Houston, became the team's first majority stockholder. The team's colors, black and gold, symbolized both Mecom's and New Orleans' strong ties to the oil industry. Trumpeter Al Hirt was part owner of the team.

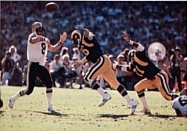
Archie Manning, pictured attempting a pass in 1980, was one of the first players to be inducted into the Saints' Ring of Honor.

Tom Fears was named as the team's first head coach. The inaugural game on September 17, 1967, started with Saints receiver John Gilliam returning the opening kickoff 94-yards for a touchdown, in a losing effort, 27–13, to the Los Angeles Rams at Tulane Stadium, with over 80,000 in attendance. It was one of the few highlights of a 3–11 season, which set an NFL record for most wins by an expansion team.

For most of their first 20 years, the Saints finished third or fourth in their division until 1979. Until 1987, the 1979 and 1983 teams were the only ones to finish at .500.

One of the franchise's early bright moments came on November 8, 1970, when Tom Dempsey kicked an NFL record-breaking 63-yard field goal at Tulane Stadium to defeat the Detroit Lions 19–17 in the final seconds of the game; the previous record was seven yards less, set in 1953. Dempsey's record was not broken until 2013 by Matt Prater of the Denver Broncos, who kicked one yard farther.

In 1980, the Saints lost their first 14 games, prompting local sportscaster Bernard "Buddy D" Diliberto to advise Saints supporters to wear paper bags over their heads at the team's home games; many bags rendered the club's name as the "'Aints" rather than the "Saints."

=== Benson era (1985–present) ===
==== Jim E. Mora years (1986–1996) ====
Tom Benson, a successful automobile dealership owner and banker, acquired the franchise in 1985, and hired Jim Finks as general manager and Jim Mora as head coach. That combination provided the Saints with their first-ever winning record and playoff appearance, going 12–3 in 1987, which had one fewer game than normal due to a players' strike. Another playoff berth would follow during the 1990 season, and the club's first division title came in 1991. During Mora's tenure, the Saints made the playoffs four times, with teams marked by strong defenses led by the "Dome Patrol" linebacking corps, but they were never able to win a playoff game. Mora coached the Saints until the middle of the 1996 season, when he stepped down halfway through the 3–13 season. His 93 wins were three more than the Saints won in their entire history before his arrival, and would remain the most for any Saints coach until 2016.

==== Mike Ditka years (1997–1999) ====
After the end of the 1996 season, ironically as Diliberto had suggested before Mora's resignation, former Chicago Bears coach Mike Ditka was hired to replace Mora. Although this initially generated a lot of excitement among Saints fans, Ditka's tenure ended up being a failure. The Saints went 6–10 in their first two seasons under Ditka (1997 and 1998). During the 1999 NFL draft, Ditka traded all of his picks for that season, as well as the first-round and third-round picks for the following season, to the Washington Redskins in order to draft University of Texas Heisman Trophy running back Ricky Williams in the first round. Ditka and Williams had a mock wedding picture taken to commemorate the occasion. However, Ditka, most of his coaching staff, and general manager Bill Kuharich were fired at the end of the 1999 season due to the club's 3–13 record.

==== Jim Haslett years (2000–2005) ====
Jim Haslett held the post from 2000 to 2005. In his first year, he took the team to the 2000 playoffs with a 10–6 mark and defeated the defending Super Bowl champion St. Louis Rams for the team's first-ever playoff win. The team lost the following week to the Minnesota Vikings. After winning the 2000 NFL Executive of the Year Award, General Manager Randy Mueller was fired between the 2001 and 2002 seasons without explanation by Benson. The Saints failed to make the playoffs in 2001 and 2002, although in the latter year they had the distinction of beating the eventual Super Bowl XXXVII champion Tampa Bay Buccaneers in both of their regular seasonmeetings, only the second team to do so in NFL history.

In 2003, the Saints again missed the playoffs after finishing 8–8. The 2004 season started poorly for the Saints, as they went 2–4 through their first six games and 4–8 through their first twelve games. At that point Haslett's job appeared to be in jeopardy; however, he managed to win the three straight games leading up to the season finale, leaving the Saints in playoff contention in the final week of the season. In week 17, the Saints defeated division rivals Carolina; however, the Saints needed other results to break their way and when the St. Louis Rams beat the New York Jets the Saints were eliminated despite having beaten the Rams, who finished with the same record. The Rams, Saints, and Vikings all were 8–8, with the Rams having a 7–5 conference record, Saints 6–6, and the Vikings 5–7. The Rams received the number 1 wild-card due to having the best conference record out of the three, followed by the Vikings due to the 38–31 loss handed to the Saints in Week 6. Haslett was fired after the 2005 season, in which the Saints finished 3–13 and played no regular-season games in New Orleans because of Hurricane Katrina.

===== Effect of Hurricane Katrina =====
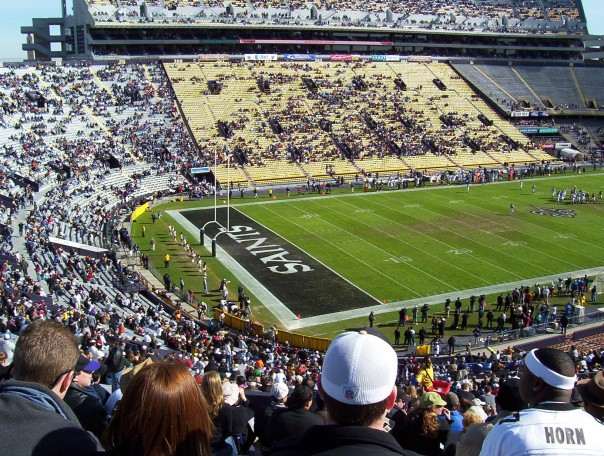
Tiger Stadium was one of the venues that hosted the Saints in 2005.

Due to the damage Hurricane Katrina caused to the Superdome and the New Orleans area, the Saints' scheduled 2005 home opener against the New York Giants was moved to Giants Stadium. The remainder of their 2005 home games were split between the Alamodome in San Antonio, Texas, and LSU's Tiger Stadium in Baton Rouge.

==== Sean Payton years (2006–2021) ====
On January 17, 2006, the Saints hired Sean Payton as their new head coach and, on March 14, signed former San Diego Chargers quarterback Drew Brees to a six-year, $60 million deal. In the 2006 NFL draft, they drafted USC Trojans football Reggie Bush, second overall.

On March 23, the Saints announced that the team's two 2006 preseason games were to be played at Shreveport, Louisiana, and Jackson, Mississippi. After a $185 million renovation of the historic stadium, on April 6 the Saints released their 2006 schedule, with all home games scheduled to be played at the Superdome. On September 19, Saints owner Tom Benson announced that the team had sold out the Louisiana Superdome for the entire season with season tickets alone (68,354 seats), a first in franchise history.

The September 25 home opener, the first home game in New Orleans after Hurricane Katrina, was won by the Saints 23–3 against the Atlanta Falcons, who were undefeated in the 2006 season at that time. The attendance for the game was a sellout crowd of 70,003. Meanwhile, the broadcast of the game was ESPN's highest-ever rated program to date, with an 11.8 rating, and viewership by 10.85 million homes. It was the most-watched program for the night, broadcast or cable, and was the second-highest rated cable program of all time at the time. Green Day and U2 performed "Wake Me Up When September Ends" and "The Saints Are Coming", respectively, before the game. The game received a 2007 ESPY award for "Best Moment in Sports." The game is remembered by Saints fans for Steve Gleason's blocked punt on the opening series that resulted in a touchdown for New Orleans.

On December 17, the Saints clinched their third division title and their first NFC South title in franchise history. For the first time in Saints' history, they clinched their NFC South title on their home field. Sean Payton became the second consecutive Saints coach to win a division title in his first season. After the Philadelphia Eagles beat the Dallas Cowboys 23–7 on Christmas Day 2006, the Saints clinched a first-round playoff bye for the first time in franchise history, finishing the regular season with a record of 10–6.

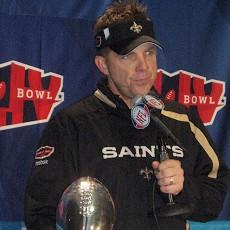
Sean Payton was the head coach of the team from 2006 to 2021.

After the first-round bye, the Saints beat the Philadelphia Eagles 27–24 in the Superdome in the 2006 Divisional Playoffs. No team had ever had such a poor record in the prior year (3–13) and then gone on to a league or conference championship game since the 1999 St. Louis Rams who advanced to win their first Super Bowl after being 4–12 the season before. Since the Saints' only previous playoff win was in the wild card round, this was the farthest the Saints had ever advanced at the time. The victory was only the second playoff win in team history. The season ended on January 21, 2007, when the Saints lost a 39–14 blowout to the Chicago Bears in the NFC Championship game.

The Saints announced that for the second year in a row, the Louisiana Superdome had sold out every ticket for the season.

The first game of the season was against the defending Super Bowl XLI champion Indianapolis Colts. The Saints lost this game, 41–10, and lost their next three games. In one of these three games, against the Tennessee Titans, the Saints lost running back Deuce McAllister for the season with his second career (second time in three seasons) ACL tear. After winning their first game, against the Seattle Seahawks, two weeks later, the team went on a four-game winning streak to bring their record to an even 4–4. After reaching 7–7, the Saints lost their final two games to finish 7–9.

Following a disappointing 7–9 record in the 2007 season, the Saints ended the 2008 season 8–8. Failing to qualify for the post-season for the second straight year, the Saints found themselves struggling on defense. However, the Saints would match the explosive offense they had in the 2006 season. Drew Brees ended the 2008 season just 16 yards short of beating Dan Marino's single-season record of 5084 total passing yards, and receiver Lance Moore came 72 yards short of his first 1,000-yard season.

===== Super Bowl XLIV champions (2009) =====
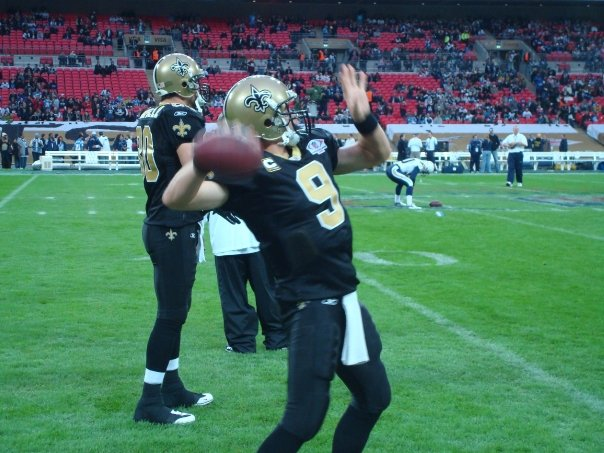
Quarterback Drew Brees was named MVP in Super Bowl XLIV.

The 2009 season was the team's most successful season, which culminated in the franchise's first league championship win against the Indianapolis Colts in Super Bowl XLIV. After achieving a record of 13–0 with their win over the Atlanta Falcons, it marked the Saints' best start to a season in its franchise history. The result clinched an NFC playoff berth and a bye in the first round of the playoffs. By winning their first 13 games, the Saints also set the record for the longest undefeated season opening (13–0) by an NFC team since the AFL–NFL merger, surpassing the previous record (12–0) held by the 1985 Chicago Bears. However, they would fall victim to the Dallas Cowboys in week 14, going on to end the season with a three-game losing streak. The Saints became the first team to win a Super Bowl after losing its last three regular season games.

Although its opponents would include winners of 9 of the last 15 NFL MVP awards, the team advanced to the 2009 NFC Championship game where they defeated the Minnesota Vikings, led by Brett Favre, 31–28 in overtime, advancing to their first Super Bowl appearance in franchise history. Television ratings for Super Bowl XLIV (44) were the second highest for any TV program, sports or otherwise, in history, as their successful bid to win the Super Bowl was seen by many to represent the city's resurgence after the devastating Hurricane Katrina.

The Saints' 2010 season began in the Superdome as the defending Super Bowl champions defeated the Minnesota Vikings 14–9, in a rematch of the 2009 NFC Championship Game. It was played on Thursday, September 9, 2010, and televised on NBC, making it the first time the Saints have opened the NFL's season at home. On Sunday, August 8, 2010, NBC announced the televised opening festivities of the evening would begin with Taylor Swift and Dave Matthews Band. On December 27, 2010, with a 17–14 win against the Atlanta Falcons in Atlanta, the Saints clinched a playoff appearance (wild card). This marked the first time a team in the NFC South had made back-to-back playoff appearances since the division was formed in 2002. The Saints would face the Seattle Seahawks for the wild card opener at Qwest Field. The Seahawks were the first NFL team to capture their division with a sub-.500 regular season record (7–9). Drew Brees completed a playoff record 39 passes for 404 yards and two touchdowns. Despite throwing 60 passes and hindered by a lack of depth at running back, last year's Super Bowl MVP was not intercepted and rallied the Saints within 34–30 in the fourth quarter. In the end, his efforts were negated by a defense that could not get enough stops and a late touchdown run by Marshawn Lynch breaking over a half-dozen tackles with 3:22 left which helped the Seahawks defeat the Saints 41–36.

The Saints began their season with a loss against the Green Bay Packers, but the team rebounded for the next four weeks to bring their record to 4–1. A loss to the Tampa Bay Buccaneers brought the record to 4–2, but the team bounced back with a 62–7 blowout win against the struggling Indianapolis Colts. A surprise loss to the St. Louis Rams resulted in the record dropping to 5–3. In the next seven weeks the Saints beat talented teams such as the eventual Super Bowl XLVI champion New York Giants, Detroit Lions, and Atlanta Falcons, bringing their season record to 12–3. To cap off the season, quarterback Drew Brees broke the single-season passing record held for over 25 years, on the way to a Saints division-winning game. The Saints won the NFC South title on December 26 and ended the 2011 season as the third seed in the NFC. They finished with a 13–3 record, beating Carolina 45–17 and also giving running back Darren Sproles the record for most all-purpose yards in a single season. The team broke numerous records that year including most yards in a season, completion percentage, yards passing, completions and more. The New Orleans Saints beat the Detroit Lions in the 2011 NFC wildcard playoff game 45–28. New Orleans also tied the NFL's postseason mark for team first downs in a game (34), and broke the record for total yards with 626, eclipsing the yardage record set 49 years ago. The Saints lost in the Divisional round in the playoffs against the San Francisco 49ers in Candlestick Park that featured the Saints losing two leads in the last four minutes of regulation.

After an offseason dominated by the bounty scandal and the year-long suspension of head coach Sean Payton, the Saints sought to refocus on football and produce yet another winning year. Instead, the team, led by offensive line coach Aaron Kromer for its first six games, started the season with four straight losses and a last-place spot in the NFC South. The team finally broke through with a win in Week 5, against the San Diego Chargers, a game that also saw quarterback Drew Brees break Johnny Unitas's longstanding record for consecutive games with a touchdown pass. After their bye week, the Saints went on to win 4 of their next 5 games, to bring their record to an even 5–5. Joe Vitt returned after his six-game suspension to serve as interim head coach for the rest of the season. The team failed to hold its momentum however, and lost the next three games, including a loss at Atlanta that also marked the end of Brees' record touchdown streak after 54 games, and a 52–27 blowout loss to the Giants that dropped the Saints to 5–8. Despite winning 2 of their last 3 games, and Brees again leading the league with 5,177 passing yards (his third time to surpass 5,000 yards, as he remained the only quarterback to break that barrier more than once), the team finished third in the NFC South, at 7–9. The Saints defense allowed 7,042 yards, setting an NFL record.

The Saints finished their 2013 preseason 3–1, and won their first five regular season games against the Atlanta Falcons, Tampa Bay Buccaneers, Arizona Cardinals, Miami Dolphins and Chicago Bears. The Saints under Sean Peyton had been winless in Chicago's Soldier Field and had not won in the Windy City since 2000. The Saints fared well against Chicago, Arizona and Miami, winning 26–18, 31–7 and 38–17 respectively, but needed a 4th down shutdown and a last-minute field goal to escape Atlanta and Tampa Bay. The Saints went on a 5–0 win streak, but were stopped short by the New England Patriots in Week 6, losing 30–27, with a touchdown pass by Tom Brady in the last 5 seconds of the game. New Orleans would go undefeated at home for the second straight season with Sean Payton as the head coach, but finish just 3–5 on the road. Key losses included a 7–34 blowout against the Seattle Seahawks on Monday Night Football in Seattle which cost them homefield advantage throughout the playoffs, a 16–27 upset against the St. Louis Rams in St. Louis which led to the Saints needing to win their next game against Carolina to control their own playoff destiny, and a heartbreaking 13–17 defeat to their division rival the Carolina Panthers in Charlotte who went on to win the NFC South. The Saints finished the season with an 11–5 record and earned a wild card berth as the sixth seed in the NFC. On January 4, 2014, the Saints recorded their first road playoff win in franchise history over the Philadelphia Eagles 26–24. On January 11, the Saints lost to the first seed, the Seattle Seahawks, once again in Seattle 15–23. The weather conditions were very poor, which gave the offense much difficulty. Despite the conditions, the defense of the Saints played well, holding Seattle to just 23 over the 34 points allowed against Seattle during the regular season.

The Saints finished the season 7–9, second in their division behind the 7–8–1 Carolina Panthers. They missed out on the playoffs after being defeated 14–30 by their divisional rival, the Atlanta Falcons, in the second-to-last week of the season. This season was notorious in Saints history for having the 31st worst-ranked defense in the league, which is one of the main reasons for the Saints' poor 2014 campaign. The only two great performances by the defense out of the entire season came from a 44–23 home win against the Green Bay Packers and a 31–15 victory against the Chicago Bears in Chicago.

The Saints finished with a 7–9 record for the second consecutive season. They were third in the NFC South after the 15–1 NFC champions Carolina Panthers and the 8–8 Atlanta Falcons. Their defense was historically bad. They allowed the most passing touchdowns in a season in NFL history as they allowed 45, effectively making them the worst passing defense in NFL history. They also set the NFL record in opposing passer rating (116.2), while finishing last in points allowed (29.8) and yards allowed per play (6.6). Atrocious play by defensive captain Brandon Browner, who set the NFL record for most penalties with 23, did not help the struggling Saints defense. Defensive coordinator Rob Ryan was fired near the halfway point in the season and was replaced by senior defensive assistant Dennis Allen. The Saints had strong play from their 2015 draft class. The Saints' first pick Andrus Peat started at right tackle and left guard at certain points in the season, and other first-round pick Stephone Anthony finished his rookie season with 112 tackles, one sack, one interception, and two forced fumbles. He had two scores, both coming against the Carolina Panthers and led all rookies in tackles. Second-round pick Hau'oli Kikaha had 4 sacks. Canadian football star Delvin Breaux, who was signed in the offseason, led the Saints struggling secondary with 3 interceptions and 19 pass deflections. Drew Brees also tied the NFL record for touchdown passes in a game with 7, coming against the New York Giants.

The Saints finished with a 7–9 record for the third consecutive season, their offense finished first in the NFL in yards per game (426.0), second in points per game (29.3), and third in yards per play (6.2). Brees led the NFL in passing yards with 5,208. However the defense yet again struggled mightily, as they were allowed the 2nd most points per game (28.4) and 6th most yards per game (375.4) while being tied for 2nd worst in yards per play allowed (6.0).

Despite an 0–2 start to the 2017 season, the Saints proceeded to win their next 8 games en route to an 11–5 finish, winning their first NFC South title since 2011. The Saints' turnaround was largely attributable to their draft, where they drafted cornerback Marshon Lattimore, offensive tackle Ryan Ramczyk, safety Marcus Williams, and running back Alvin Kamara. It is widely considered one of the best draft classes in NFL history. The defense drastically improved, as they allowed just 20.4 points per game while finishing third in the league with 20 interceptions. The offense continued to be excellent, finishing second in yards per game (391.2) and fourth in points per game (28.0).

In the wild card round, the Saints defeated the Carolina Panthers in the wild card round, 31–26. However, in the divisional round, the Saints lost 29–24 to the Minnesota Vikings after the Vikings completed the Minneapolis Miracle. The Minneapolis Miracle was a stunning finish in which Vikings quarterback Case Keenum completed a pass towards the sideline to Stefon Diggs, then Marcus Williams missed a tackle and Diggs was able to run to the end zone for a 61-yard touchdown with no time left on the clock.

On March 15, 2018, the Saints' owner Tom Benson died from flu at the age of 90 after he was hospitalized on February 16, 2018. Benson's wife Gayle Benson succeeded him as the owner of the Saints and the NBA's New Orleans Pelicans.

In the 2018 season, the Saints finished with a 13–3 record and won the NFC South. The Saints defeated the Philadelphia Eagles 20–14 in the Divisional Round. The Saints fell to the Los Angeles Rams 26–23 in overtime in the NFC Championship in a game that had a controversial ending to regulation.

In the 2019 season, the Saints finished with a 13–3 record and won the NFC South. The Saints lost 26–20 in overtime to the Minnesota Vikings in the Wild Card Round.

In the 2020 season, the Saints won the NFC South with a 12–4 record. In the Wild Card Round, they defeated the Chicago Bears 21–9. In the Divisional Round, they fell to their NFC South rivals, the Tampa Bay Buccaneers, 30–20. The loss was Drew Brees's final game.

Following Drew Brees's retirement, the Saints had a revolving door at quarterback in the 2021 season with Trevor Siemian, Jameis Winston, Taysom Hill, and Ian Book starting over the course of the year. In the 2021 season, the Saints finished 9–8 and missed the postseason.

On January 25, 2022, Sean Payton announced to the team that he was stepping away as head coach after 15 seasons with the team. During his tenure as head coach, the Saints went 152–89 in the regular season and 9–8 in the postseason.

==== Dennis Allen years (2022–2024) ====
The team promoted defensive coordinator, Dennis Allen to head coach on February 8, 2022.

On November 14, 2022, after a 3–7 start, disappointed Saints fans started a petition on change.org, asking to relieve Dennis Allen of his duties. The Saints finished the 2022 season with a 7–10 mark and missed the postseason. Allen would maintain his head coaching position into the start of the 2023 season.

During the 2023 season, The Saints brought in a new quarterback in Derek Carr, hoping that he would solidify the position. Dennis Allen and the Saints had one of the easiest schedules in the league, but finished with a 9–8 record missing the playoffs after a 3rd straight season.

Dennis Allen was fired on November 4, 2024, following a 23–22 loss to division rivals Carolina Panthers and a 2–7 start.Assistant head coach and special teams coordinator Darren Rizzi was named interim head coach for the remainder of the season, where the team finished with a 5-12 record.

==== Kellen Moore years (2025-present) ====
On February 11, 2025, the Saints hired Philadelphia Eagles offensive coordinator Kellen Moore as their next head coach, who had just won Super Bowl LIX in the Caesars Superdome two days earlier. On May 10, 2025, Carr announced his retirement from the NFL after 11 seasons.

The Saints started the 2025 season with a 2-10 record. During their week 8 game against the Tampa Bay Buccaneers, Spencer Rattler was benched in favor of rookie Tyler Shough. Shough was named the starter the following week against the Los Angeles Rams, and remained the starter for the rest of the season. The Saints won four of their last five games, but a week 13 loss to the Miami Dolphins eliminated them from playoff contention for the fifth consecutive season. The Saints finished with a record of 6-11.

== Logos and uniforms ==
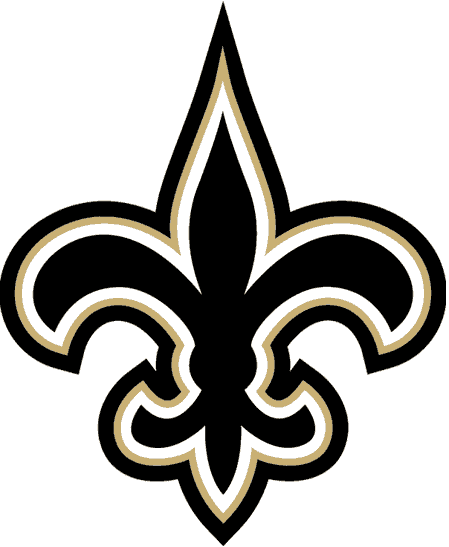
The fleur-de-lis, a French heraldic symbol, is prominent in the culture of Louisiana. It is the primary symbol of the Saints.

The fleur-de-lis over the State of Louisiana has been a secondary logo for the Saints since 1985.

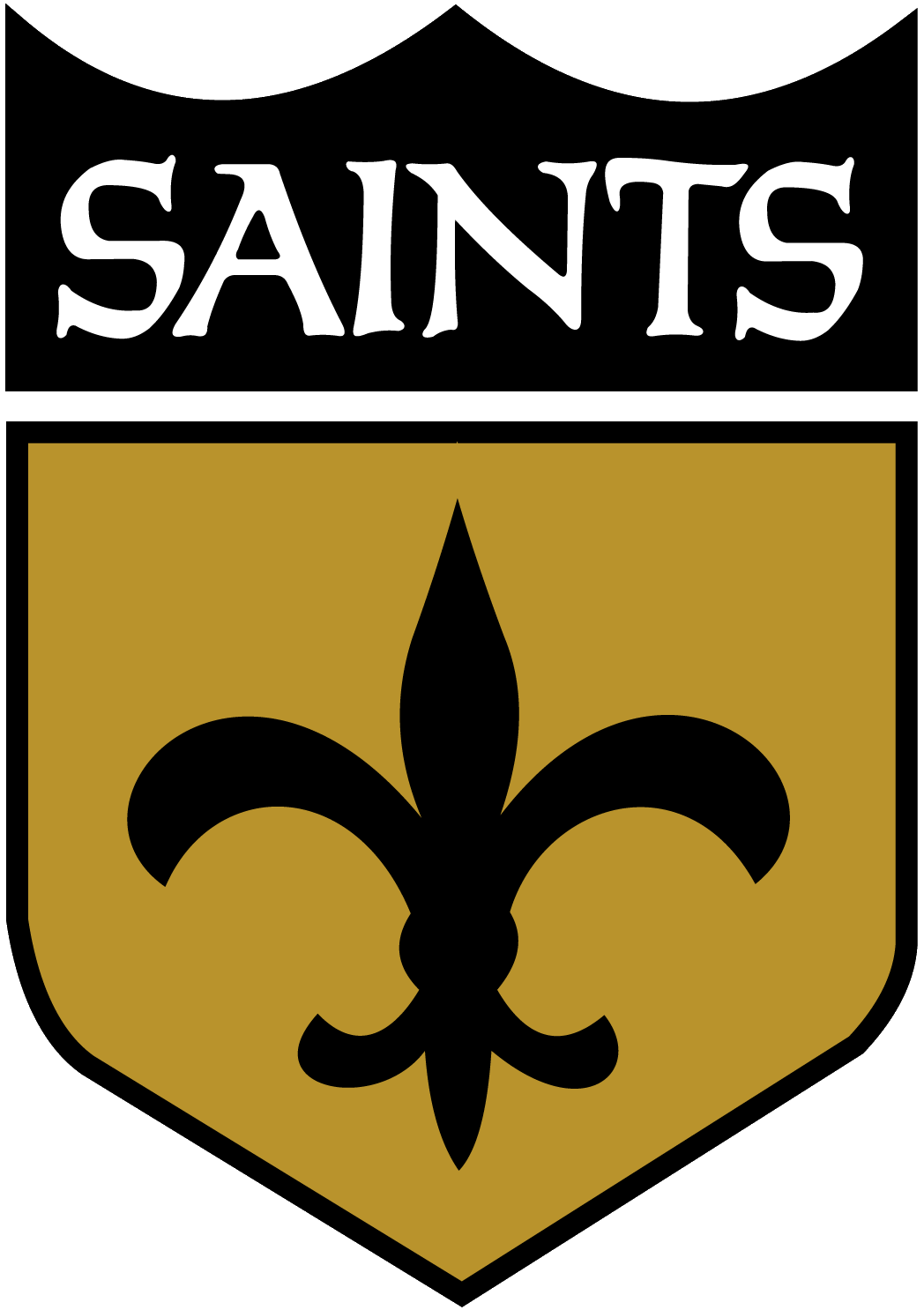
The Saints shield alternate logo was in use primarily from 1967 to 1984. A popular variation of this logo features Saints mascot Sir Saint bearing the shield.

Black, along with old gold and white, has always been one of the team colors, but it was not the first choice of original majority owner John W. Mecom Jr. His preference was for Mecom blue, a medium shade which was used by all of his other investments. The NFL office, however, informed him that his proposed combination too closely resembled that worn by the San Diego Chargers. Although the Chargers were members of the AFL, the older league did not want to offend its soon-to-be partner so soon after the merger. Mecom settled on black as the primary color as a nod to his financial involvement in the petroleum industry. "Black gold" is a term synonymous with oil. Although the Pittsburgh Steelers—who played a few home games in New Orleans during their early years to avoid conflict with the Pittsburgh Panthers football team—have long used black and gold as their colors, their shade of gold more closely resembles yellow, making the Saints black and gold compatible with the rest of the NFL.

Except for minor modifications, the Saints' logo and uniforms have basically remained the same since the club debuted in 1967. The team's logo is a fleur-de-lis (a symbol of the City of New Orleans and of France's Royal Family, which included the House of Bourbon), while its uniform design consists of gold helmets, gold pants, and either black or white jerseys. Minor changes to the uniform stripes and trim have been made throughout the years. The team wore black helmets during the 1969 preseason, but NFL commissioner Pete Rozelle barred the Saints from using the helmets during the regular season, since Mecom did not notify the league office of the change. Black helmets were not introduced until 2022, after the NFL repealed its "one-helmet rule" previously enforced in 2013.

The Saints predominantly wore white at home when the club played at Tulane Stadium from 1967 through 1974 (except in 1969 and 1970), forcing opponents to suffer in their darker jerseys in the subtropical climate of New Orleans. When the surface at Tulane Stadium switched from natural grass to PolyTurf in 1971, field temperatures became hotter still. In Archie Manning's first game, in the 1971 season opener against the Los Angeles Rams, temperatures on the field reached as high as 130 °F (54 °C). The heavily favored Rams wilted in the stifling heat, and the Saints claimed their first-ever victory over their NFC West rivals, 24–20, on Manning's one-yard quarterback sneak on the last play of the game.

The Saints switched to white pants in 1975, coinciding with the team's move from Tulane Stadium to the Superdome, and have worn white at home numerous times since then. One year later, they started to wear black pants with their white jerseys, a move influenced by coach Hank Stram, who introduced red pants to the Kansas City Chiefs' uniforms in 1968. In an October 3, 1976, home game against the Houston Oilers, Hank Stram used the Saints' road uniforms, the white jerseys and black pants. The Saints lost that game 31–26. During the 1981–82 seasons (Bum Phillips' first two seasons as coach), the team wore white jerseys with black pants at home, but reverted to the black jerseys and white pants for 1983. They reverted to wearing gold pants with both their black and white jerseys in 1986 under new coach Jim E. Mora. From 1986 through 1995, the sleeves of the jerseys and sides of the pants featured a logo with a fleur-de-lis inside an outline of the state of Louisiana (with the location of New Orleans marked with a star in the state outline). The logo replaced the striping pattern that had been on the uniforms since the team's inception; save for color variations, the striping pattern was similar to that used by the Washington Redskins (until 1979), Green Bay Packers (until 1997), and Cleveland Browns (until 2014), which is likely why the change was made. That logo was removed in 1996 and replaced with a fleur-de-lis on both the sleeves and sides of the pants.

From 1996 through 1998, the Saints returned to gold numbers on both the white and black jerseys, but complaints about the numbers on the white jerseys being too difficult to read forced the numbers on the white jerseys to be changed to black in 1999. The Saints wore black pants with a wide gold stripe with their white jerseys in 1999, but following a 3–13 season and the dismissal of coach Mike Ditka, the black pants were mothballed by new coach Jim Haslett.

=== 2000s ===
In 2000, the Saints won their first playoff game as they hosted the St. Louis Rams, and after having a better road record than home record, they wore their white jerseys, and won 31–28 over the defending champion Rams. The defining play of the game came with the Saints clinging to a three-point lead with minutes to play. The Saints punted to the Rams' Az-Zahir Hakim (who would play one season for the Saints in 2005), who fumbled the punt deep in Rams' territory. Brian Milne recovered for the Saints, who then ran out the clock to preserve the victory.

In 2001, they wore their white jerseys in the first six home games. During that same year, they primarily wore black pants with both their white and black jerseys. They became the first NFL team to wear all-black uniforms in a Week 5 road game against the Carolina Panthers, and again in weeks 16 and 17 in home games against the Washington Redskins and San Francisco 49ers; the Saints were outscored 78–10 in the final two contests to end a 7–9 campaign.

In 2002, the Saints wore black pants with their white jerseys (except for the final road game, a 20–13 loss in Cincinnati when they went back to the gold pants), and gold pants with their black jerseys, a gold alternate jersey, and a 1967-style throwback uniform, complete with an accurate 1967-era helmet which featured a larger fleur-de-lis, a darker shade of gold and grey facemasks. But one season later, they stopped using the alternates and again reverted to wearing gold pants with both their black and white jerseys.

The team introduced a gold alternate jersey (worn with the black pants) during a December 15, 2002, game versus the Minnesota Vikings, a 32–31 loss, but have never worn them since then. Because of the metallic gold's bright color, the gold jerseys were considered the "light" jersey in the game, so the Vikings wore their purple home jerseys as the "dark" colored team. One team must wear "dark" and one team must wear "light", this was done because of black & white TV broadcasts so viewers could tell the teams apart. The only exception being if both teams are wearing throwback uniforms, such as Thanksgiving Classic games. From 2003 through 2007, the New England Patriots had a "light" jersey (their alternate, a bright metallic silver) that is not white in which the other team would wear their colored, or "dark" jerseys against them since the third jersey rule was implemented in the NFL in 2002.

The Saints also introduced a 1967-style throwback uniform in a 23–20 win on December 1, 2002, against the Tampa Bay Buccaneers. This uniform was not worn again until a 40–33 win against the Houston Texans on September 25, 2011, and also on November 6, 2011, against the Tampa Bay Buccaneers in a 27–16 Saints win. However, the 2011 throwbacks use the current helmet, meaning the shades of gold on the helmet and jersey do not match. This uniform was brought back on December 4, 2016, a 28–13 loss to the Detroit Lions, in commemoration of the franchise's 50th season. It was then shelved for five seasons before returning on November 21, 2022, against the Los Angeles Rams.

In 2006, to honor their return to Louisiana, the Saints wore a patch on their uniforms with an outline of the State of Louisiana with a fleur-de-lis superimposed, similar to the logo from the 1980s.

The Saints originally planned to wear white jerseys at home for the 2006 season, but during the season, the players voted to wear the black jerseys at home after the second game. Since the team had informed the NFL office that they planned to wear white jerseys at home, each of the Saints' remaining home opponents would have to agree to New Orleans' request. The Atlanta Falcons, Tampa Bay Buccaneers and Cincinnati Bengals did not agree to the switch, forcing the Saints to wear white jerseys for those games.

Starting in week 13 of the 2006 season, the Saints wore black pants with the black jerseys against the San Francisco 49ers (restoring them after a four-season absence), and in a Week 16 game in The Meadowlands against the New York Giants (a 30–7 Saints win), the Saints wore the black pants with their road white jerseys. The Saints later stuck with the black pants in their 2006 playoff run.

Since 2006, the Saints have worn white jerseys at home for most preseason games and early regular season home games, with the exception of the 2007 and 2017 seasons.

In 2009, the Saints wore the black pants only once, beating St. Louis 28–23. They wore the white jerseys/gold pants combination during the Super Bowl XLIV victory over the Indianapolis Colts. In 2012 and 2014, the Saints wore black pants 12 times and wore gold pants 4 times. In 2013, gold pants were used only 7 times (including playoffs). After 2015, a season in which the gold pants were donned 10 times, the Saints only wore them sporadically in the regular season, though they were still used regularly in the preseason.

Before the 2016 season, the NFL introduced the Color Rush program, and the Saints' version is a mixture of uniform designs from earlier eras. White jersey tops had old gold numbers with black trim along with gold and black sleeve stripes (a nod to the team's late 1960s uniforms). Complementing the uniforms were white pants (inspired from the 1975–85 look) and all-white socks. The Saints first wore the uniform during Week 11 of that season against the Carolina Panthers on the road, and was worn on the road two more times thereafter. Its first home appearance came in Week 11 of the 2018 season against the Philadelphia Eagles; the Saints were forced to wear the white uniforms at home after head coach Sean Payton lost a bet with Eagles coach Doug Pederson during a charity golf event in the offseason.

In 2019, a variation of the all-white Color Rush look was unveiled during the Week 6 game against the Jacksonville Jaguars. The Saints wore their current white uniforms, but paired them with white pants minus any striping (an inverse of their black pants). During the regular season, New Orleans went undefeated (8–0) while wearing either all-white uniform. As a result, they opted to wear the new all-white look at home during the Wild Card Round against the Minnesota Vikings. However, the Saints' luck finally ran out, losing in overtime 26–20. On December 24, 2022, the Saints wore another variation of the all-white uniform, this time wearing black socks at the Cleveland Browns. The plain white pants were then paired with the black uniform on January 8, 2023, against the Carolina Panthers, a look last seen in the 1985 season.

In 2022, the Saints unveiled an alternate black helmet, featuring a gold fleur-de-lis on each side and a triangle pattern of tiny gold fleur-de-lis logos. The helmets are worn with the Color Rush uniforms. The black helmets made its official regular season debut in an NFL London Game at Tottenham Hotspur Stadium against the Minnesota Vikings on October 2, 2022.

In 2025, after the NFL allowed teams to add a second alternate helmet, the Saints unveiled a white helmet, featuring a gold facemask, a thick gold middle stripe with fleur-de-lis silhouettes, two thin black stripes, and the gold fleur-de-lis on each side. This helmet would be worn with the all-white Color Rush uniform, replacing the previous black alternate helmet. The black helmets were then paired with a new "Gameday Gold" alternate uniform, which was similar to their previous gold alternate they last wore in 2002, with the exception of black sleeve cuffs replacing the gold cuffs. Like in 2002, during their Week 1 game against the Arizona Cardinals, the Saints wore black pants and socks with this uniform, however, the Saints' gold uniform was treated as a "dark" uniform with the Cardinals wearing their all-white road uniform for the game. Then for their Week 16 game against the New York Jets, the Saints again wore their "Gameday Gold" uniform but paired them with the rarely-used gold pants; similar to Week 1, the Jets wore their standard white road uniforms against the Saints in gold.

== Stadium ==
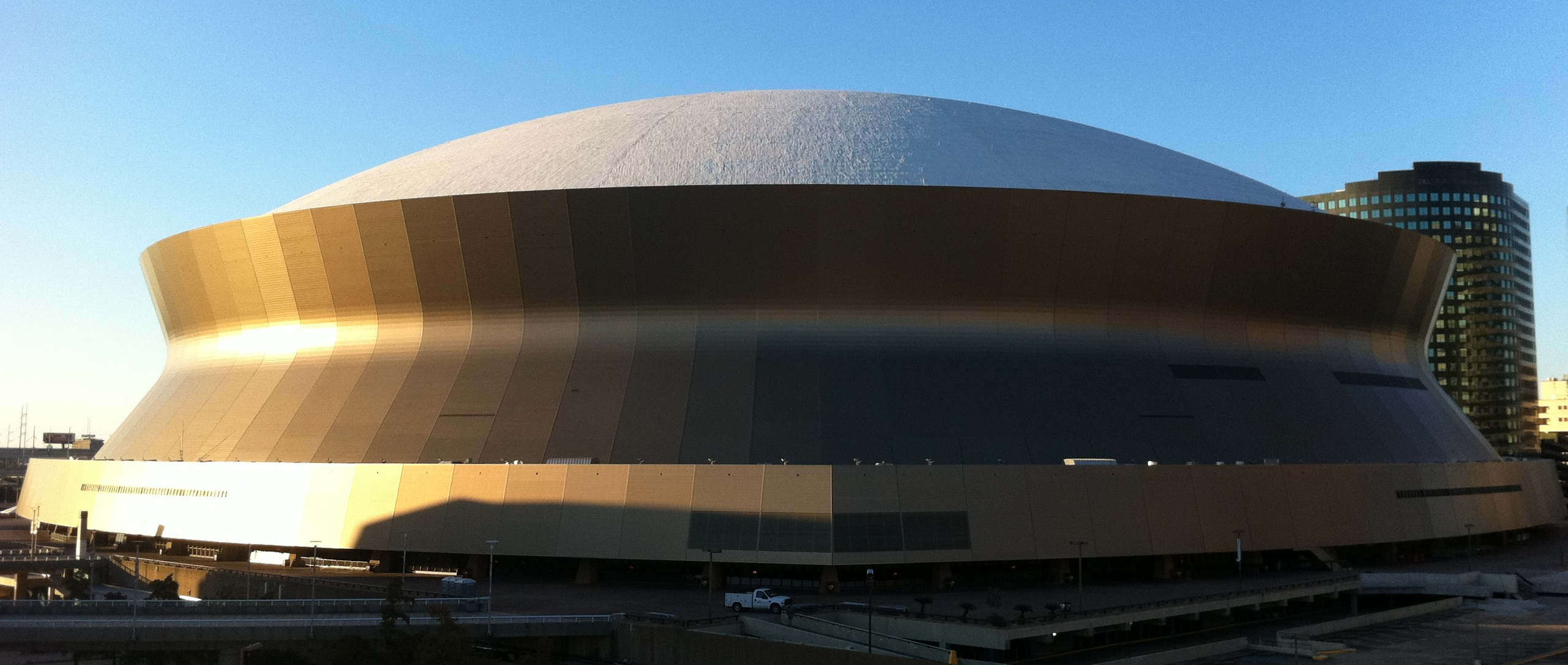
The Superdome has been the home of the Saints since 1975.

Caesars Superdome is the Saints' home stadium. It has a listed seating capacity of 76,468 (expanded) or 73,208 (not expanded). The Saints own a perfect record there against the Houston Texans (3–0), but a winless one against the Baltimore Ravens (0–3).

== Rivalries ==
=== Divisional ===
==== Atlanta Falcons ====
The Saints' oldest rival are the Atlanta Falcons, both teams were the original two NFL franchises along the southern coast of the United States in the late 1960s. Originally both teams were created as part of the NFC West until the league's realignment in 2002. The frequent divisional matchups and constant tensions between the two teams has fueled a long-standing rivalry between both cities. As of the 2025 Season, the Falcons lead the rivalry with a record of 58–57, giving Atlanta a slight edge in the conflict. The teams have faced once in the postseason, in which the Falcons defeated the Saints 27–20 in the 1991 NFC Wild Card game. The two clubs joined the NFL within a year of each other as expansion teams and have played each other twice a season since the Saints joined the league in 1967.

==== Tampa Bay Buccaneers ====
Ever since the early 2000s, the Saints have had a developing rivalry with the Tampa Bay Buccaneers, who have been part of the NFC South with the Saints since 2002, and the Saints lead the overall series, 40–25.

The teams actually played each other quite often as non-division rivals. Between 1977 and 2001, there were only five years in which the teams did not play. This includes 12 years in a row from 1981 to 1992 – all as a result of the scheduling formulas in place before 2002 (this remains a record for most consecutive years in which two teams not from the same division met each other).

The Saints won 13 of 20 games as non-division opponents. Since becoming division rivals, the Saints have the edge in the series, winning 16 games to the Bucs' 10.

One notable pre-division game is a 1977 matchup that resulted in Tampa Bay's first win in franchise history coming against New Orleans after previously starting out 0–26 overall.

On January 17, 2021, the two teams faced off in the playoffs for the first time in their rivalry history with Tampa Bay winning 30–20, despite New Orleans beating Tampa Bay in both regular season meetings.

==== Carolina Panthers ====
The Saints and the Carolina Panthers have been division rivals since Carolina joined the league as an expansion franchise in 1995, first in the NFC West and then in the NFC South since 2002.

Carolina defeated New Orleans on the road every year from 2002 to 2008, a streak of seven seasons. Notable games include Carolina's 19–7 home victory in 1996 that sparked Saints head coach Jim Mora's infamous "Diddley Poo" rant and resignation from the team, Carolina's 10–6 win in the 2002 season finale at the Superdome to knock the Saints out of the playoffs, and the emotional 2005 season opener at Carolina where the Saints won 23–20 in the face of Hurricane Katrina and an eventual 3–13 season.

In their last game in the 2014 NFL season, a fight between players broke out in the end zone and spilled out into the tunnel entrance after a Cam Newton touchdown, with Panther's tight end Brandon Williams getting ejected and both teams receiving offsetting penalties. The Panthers won the contest 41–10, with early turnovers by the Saints being a factor in the blowout.

On January 7, 2018, the two teams met in the NFL playoffs for the first time in the wild card round. It was the first playoff game between NFC South teams since the division's formation in 2002. The Saints beat the Panthers 31–26, thus eliminating Carolina. As of the 2023 season, the Saints lead the all-time series 31–28.

=== Conference ===
==== Minnesota Vikings ====
The Saints have developed a strong postseason rivalry with the Minnesota Vikings as they have met in many consequential regular season and playoff games, including the historic Minneapolis Miracle. As of the 2024 season, the Vikings lead the overall series 25–13 with a 4–1 record in the playoffs.

==== Los Angeles Rams ====
The Saints and the Los Angeles Rams once shared a fierce divisional rivalry as the Saints played in the NFC West until the league's realignment in 2002. Animosity resurged between the two teams during the 2010s after the Rams had lured Saints' controversial defensive coordinator Gregg Williams in 2012, shortly before Williams and Saints' head coach Sean Payton would be implicated in the infamous Bountygate Scandal. Both teams had thrown insults towards one another in the media, most notably during the controversial 2018 NFC Championship Game, in which a critical pass to Saints' receiver Tommylee Lewis was illegally broken up by Rams' cornerback Nickell Robey-Coleman, though no flag was thrown, enraging the Saints for the blown call. Saints' receiver Michael Thomas expressed his anger towards the Rams and in regards to the no-call to the media following the game. As of the 2024 season, the teams are tied 1–1 in the postseason, but the Rams lead the all-time series 45–35.

== Statistics ==
=== Overall records ===
The New Orleans Saints have competed in 58 NFL seasons, dating back to 1967. The team has compiled a 417–480–5 (.465) and a 10–13 (.435) record record in the playoffs, for an overall record of 427–493–5 and a .464 winning percentage.

=== Record vs. opponents ===
Note: W = Wins, L = Losses, T = Ties

| Team | W | L | T | Percent | Last result | Last date | Last locale | Postseason |
|---|---|---|---|---|---|---|---|---|
| Jacksonville Jaguars | 5 | 3 | 0 | .625 | L 24–31 | October 19, 2023 | New Orleans, Louisiana | |
| Seattle Seahawks | 10 | 9 | 0 | .526 | L 13–44 | September 21, 2025 | Seattle, Washington | 0–2 postseason |
| Buffalo Bills | 7 | 6 | 0 | .538 | L 19–31 | September 28, 2025 | Orchard Park, NY | |
| Baltimore / Indianapolis Colts | 10 | 5 | 0 | .667 | W 38–27 | October 29, 2023 | Indianapolis, Indiana | 1–0 postseason |
| Tampa Bay Buccaneers | 40 | 28 | 0 | .588 | L 3–23 | October 26, 2025 | New Orleans, LA | 0–1 postseason |
| Houston Texans | 3 | 3 | 0 | .500 | L 13–20 | October 15, 2023 | Houston, Texas | |
| Chicago Bears | 19 | 16 | 0 | .543 | L 14–26 | October 25, 2026 | Paris, FR | 1–2 postseason |
| Pittsburgh Steelers | 9 | 8 | 0 | .615 | L 10–20 | November 13, 2022 | Pittsburgh, Pennsylvania | |
| Detroit Lions | 14 | 14 | 1 | .500 | L 30-31 | September 13, 2026 | Ford Field | 1–0 postseason |
| New York Jets | 8 | 6 | 0 | .571 | W 30–9 | December 12, 2021 | East Rutherford, New Jersey | |
| Carolina Panthers | 32 | 29 | 0 | .525 | L 22–23 | November 3, 2024 | Charlotte, North Carolina | 1–0 postseason |
| St. Louis / Phoenix / Arizona Cardinals | 16 | 17 | 0 | .485 | L 13–20 | September 7, 2025 | New Orleans, LA | 1–0 postseason |
| Atlanta Falcons | 56 | 58 | 0 | .491 | L 24–45 | October 5, 2026 | New Orleans, Louisiana | 0–1 postseason |
| Oakland / Los Angeles / Las Vegas Raiders | 7 | 8 | 1 | .469 | L 10–25 | December 29, 2024 | New Orleans, Louisiana | |
| Cincinnati Bengals | 7 | 8 | 0 | .467 | L 26–30 | October 16, 2022 | New Orleans, Louisiana | |
| Miami Dolphins | 6 | 7 | 0 | .462 | L 3–20 | December 27, 2021 | New Orleans, Louisiana | |
| San Diego / Los Angeles Chargers | 6 | 8 | 0 | .429 | L 8–26 | October 28, 2024 | Los Angeles, California | |
| New York Giants | 16 | 17 | 0 | .485 | W 14–11 | December 8, 2024 | East Rutherford, New Jersey | |
| St. Louis / Los Angeles Rams | 35 | 46 | 0 | .432 | L 10–34 | November 2, 2024 | Inglewood, CA | 1–1 postseason |
| Houston Oilers / Tennessee Titans | 9 | 7 | 1 | .559 | W 16–15 | September 10, 2023 | New Orleans, Louisiana | |
| Dallas Cowboys | 14 | 18 | 0 | .438 | W 44–19 | September 15, 2024 | Arlington, Texas | |
| Kansas City Chiefs | 5 | 8 | 0 | .385 | L 13–26 | October 7, 2024 | Kansas City, Missouri | |
| Philadelphia Eagles | 16 | 20 | 0 | .457 | L 12–15 | September 22, 2024 | New Orleans, Louisiana | 3–1 postseason |
| Washington Redskins / Commanders | 11 | 18 | 0 | .379 | L 19–20 | December 15, 2024 | New Orleans, Louisiana | |
| Green Bay Packers | 10 | 19 | 0 | .345 | L 0–34 | December 23, 2024 | Green Bay, Wisconsin | |
| San Francisco 49ers | 27 | 51 | 2 | .350 | L 21–26 | September 14, 2025 | New Orleans, LA | 0–1 postseason |
| Minnesota Vikings | 12 | 26 | 0 | .316 | L 13-23 | November 12, 2026 | New Orleans, LA | 1–4 postseason |
| New England Patriots | 6 | 11 | 0 | .353 | L 19–25 | October 12, 2025 | New Orleans, LA | |
| Cleveland Browns | 7 | 13 | 0 | .350 | W 35–14 | November 17, 2024 | New Orleans, Louisiana | |
| Baltimore Ravens | 2 | 6 | 0 | .250 | L 27–13 | November 7, 2022 | New Orleans, Louisiana | |
| Denver Broncos | 3 | 10 | 0 | .231 | L 10–33 | October 17, 2024 | New Orleans, Louisiana | |
| Total | 417 | 492 | 5 | .459 | | | | |
| Total including playoffs | 427 | 505 | 5 | .458 | | | | |

=== Single-game records ===
- Passing yards: 510 Drew Brees (November 19, 2006, vs Cincinnati Bengals)
- Passing yards per attempt: 16.1 Drew Brees (November 30, 2009, vs New England Patriots)
- Passing touchdowns: 7 Drew Brees (November 1, 2015, vs New York Giants) T – NFL record
- Passer rating: 158.3 Drew Brees (November 30, 2009, vs New England Patriots) T – NFL record
- Consecutive pass completions: 23 Drew Brees (December 16/22, 2019, vs. Indianapolis Colts and Tennessee Titans)
- Rushing yards: 206 George Rogers (September 4, 1983, vs St. Louis Cardinals)
- Rushing touchdowns: 6 Alvin Kamara (December 25, 2020, vs Minnesota Vikings) T – NFL record
- Receptions: 16 Michael Thomas (September 9, 2018, vs Tampa Bay Buccaneers)
- Receptions, postseason game: 15 Darren Sproles (January 14, 2012, at San Francisco 49ers)
- Receiving yards: 211 Michael Thomas (November 4, 2018, vs Los Angeles Rams)
- Receiving touchdowns: 4 Joe Horn (December 14, 2003, vs New York Giants)
- Punt return yards: 176 Reggie Bush (October 6, 2008, vs Minnesota Vikings)
- Kick return yards: 304 Tyrone Hughes (October 23, 1994, vs Los Angeles Rams) NFL record
- Kick return & punt return yards: 347 Tyrone Hughes (October 23, 1994, vs Los Angeles Rams) NFL record
- Passes intercepted: 3 Sammy Knight (September 9, 2001, at Buffalo Bills)
- Longest interception return: 99 yards Darren Sharper (October 4, 2009, vs New York Jets)
- Yards from scrimmage: 237 Deuce McAllister (November 16, 2003, vs Atlanta Falcons)
- All-purpose yards: 356 Michael Lewis (October 13, 2002, vs Washington Redskins)
- Longest field goal: 63 yards Tom Dempsey (November 8, 1970, vs Detroit Lions)
- Field goals: 6 Tom Dempsey (November 16, 1969, at New York Giants)
- Total touchdowns: 6 Alvin Kamara (December 25, 2020, vs Minnesota Vikings) T – NFL record
- Points scored: 36 Alvin Kamara (December 25, 2020, vs Minnesota Vikings)
- Points scored, team: 62 (October 23, 2011, vs Indianapolis Colts)
- Sacks: 4.0 many times, most recently Cameron Jordan, (November 28, 2019, vs Atlanta Falcons)
- Margin of victory: 62–7 (October 23, 2011, vs Indianapolis Colts)
- First downs: 40 (November 10, 2013, vs Dallas Cowboys) NFL record

=== Super Bowl appearance(s) ===
| Season | Super Bowl | Head Coach | Location | Stadium | Opponent | Result | Record |
|---|---|---|---|---|---|---|---|
| 2009 | XLIV | Sean Payton | Miami Gardens, Florida | Sun Life Stadium | Indianapolis Colts | W 31–17 | 13–3 |
| Total Super Bowls won: | | | | | | 1 | |

=== Single-season records ===
- Passing attempts: 673 Drew Brees (2016)
- Passing completions: 471 Drew Brees (2016)
- Passing completion percentage: 74.4 Drew Brees (2018) – NFL record
- Passing yards: 5,476 Drew Brees (2011)
- Passing touchdowns: 46 Drew Brees (2011)
- Passing interceptions: 22 Aaron Brooks (2001), Drew Brees (2010)
- Passer rating: 116.3 Drew Brees (2019)
- Rushing attempts: 378 George Rogers (1981)
- Rushing yards: 1,674 George Rogers (1981)
- Rushing touchdowns: 16 Alvin Kamara (2020)
- Receptions: 149 Michael Thomas (2019) – NFL record
- Receiving yards: 1,725 Michael Thomas (2019)
- Receiving touchdowns: 16 Jimmy Graham (2013)
- Quarterback sacks: 17 Pat Swilling (1991) and La'Roi Glover (2000)
- Passes intercepted: 10 Dave Whitsell (1967)
- Pass interception return yards: 376 Darren Sharper (2009) – NFL record
- Pass interceptions returned for touchdowns: 3 Darren Sharper (2009)
- Field goals attempts: 41 Tom Dempsey (1969)
- Field goals made: 32 Wil Lutz (2019)
- Points: 147 John Kasay (2011)
- Total touchdowns: 21 Alvin Kamara (2020)
- Punt return yards: 625 Michael Lewis (2002)
- All-purpose yards: 2,696 Darren Sproles (2011) – NFL record
- Yards from scrimmage: 2,157 Deuce McAllister (2003)
- Points scored (team): 547 (2011)

=== Career records ===
- Passing attempts: 8,742 Drew Brees (2006–2020)
- Passing completions: 6,017 Drew Brees (2006–2020)
- Passing yards: 68,010 Drew Brees (2006–2020)
- Passing touchdowns: 491 Drew Brees (2006–2020)
- Passer rating: 101.5 Drew Brees (2006–2020)
- Passing interceptions: 190 Drew Brees (2006–2020)
- Rushing attempts: 1,674 Alvin Kamara (2017–2025)
- Rushing yards: 7,250 Alvin Kamara (2017–2025)
- Rushing touchdowns: 61 Alvin Kamara (2017–2025)
- Receptions: 711 Marques Colston (2006–2015)
- Receiving yards: 9,759 Marques Colston (2006–2015)
- Receiving touchdowns: 72 Marques Colston (2006–2015)
- Quarterback sacks: 132 Cameron Jordan (2011–2025)
- Passes intercepted: 37 Dave Waymer (1980–1989)
- Field goal attempts: 389 Morten Andersen (1982–1994)
- Field goals made: 302 Morten Andersen (1982–1994)
- Extra points made: 412 Morten Andersen (1982–1994)
- Points: 1,318 Morten Andersen (1982–1994)
- Total touchdowns: 87 Alvin Kamara (2017–2025)
- Pass interception return yards: 621 Tom Myers (1972–1981)
- Pass interceptions returned for touchdowns: 4 Sammy Knight (1997–2002)
- Punt return yards: 1,482 Michael Lewis (2001–2006)
- Punt return touchdowns: 4 Reggie Bush (2006–2010)
- Kick return yards: 5,903 Michael Lewis (2001–2006)
- Longest punt: 81 Tom McNeill (1967–1969)
- Games: 243 Cameron Jordan (2011–2025)

== Notable players ==
=== Pro Football Hall of Famers ===
**New Orleans Saints in the Pro Football Hall of Fame**
**Players**
| No. | Player | Position | Tenure | Inducted |
| 31 | Jim Taylor | FB | 1967 | 1976 |
| 81 | Doug Atkins | DE | 1967–1969 | 1982 |
| 35 | Earl Campbell | RB | 1984–1985 | 1991 |
| 57 | **Rickey Jackson** | LB | 1981–1993 | 2010 |
| 77 | **Willie Roaf** | OT | 1993–2001 | 2012 |
| 16 | Ken Stabler | QB | 1982–1984 | 2016 |
| 7 | **Morten Andersen** | K | 1982–1994 | 2017 |
| 51 | **Sam Mills** | LB | 1986–1994 | 2022 |
| 21 | Eric Allen | CB | 1995–1997 | 2025 |
| 9 | **Drew Brees** | QB | 2006–2020 | 2026 |
**Coaches and executives**
| Name | | Positions | Tenure | Inducted |
| **Jim Finks** | | General Manager | 1986–1993 | 1995 |
| Hank Stram | | Coach | 1976–1977 | 2003 |

Until the selection of Rickey Jackson in 2010, there had been no players in the Hall of Fame who earned their credentials primarily as Saints; the others were chosen for their work with previous teams. Jim Finks’ tenure as Saints general manager was a significant factor in his selection. When offensive tackle Willie Roaf was selected in 2012, he became the second Saint to earn his Hall of Fame credentials mostly while in New Orleans. Roaf was a member of the NFL's All-Decade team of the '90s. Morten Andersen was selected in 2017, becoming the third former player inducted primarily for their accomplishments in New Orleans. Andersen was only the second kicker inducted into the Hall of Fame (the other was Jan Stenerud in 1991). Sam Mills in 2022 became the 4th former player inducted primarily for his accomplishments in New Orleans. In 2026, Drew Brees became the 5th Saint to be inducted into the Hall of Fame.

=== Pro Bowl players ===
The following Saints players have been named to at least one Pro Bowl:

- **QB** Drew Brees, Archie Manning
- **FB** Tony Baker
- **RB** Deuce McAllister, Dalton Hilliard, Rueben Mayes, George Rogers, Chuck Muncie, Andy Livingston, Mark Ingram II, Alvin Kamara
- **LT** Jammal Brown, William Roaf, Jermon Bushrod, Terron Armstead
- **LG** Brad Edelman, Jake Kupp, Carl Nicks, Ben Grubbs, Andrus Peat
- **C** LeCharles Bentley, Joel Hilgenberg, Jonathan Goodwin, Max Unger, Erik McCoy
- **RG** Jahri Evans, Larry Warford
- **RT** Jon Stinchcomb
- **TE** Hoby Brenner, Henry Childs, Jimmy Graham, Jared Cook
- **WR** Joe Horn, Eric Martin, Wes Chandler, Michael Thomas
- **DE** Will Smith, Joe Johnson, Wayne Martin, Renaldo Turnbull, Bruce Clark, Cameron Jordan
- **DT** Dave Rowe, La'Roi Glover
- **LB** Jonathan Vilma, Mark Fields, Keith Mitchell, Sam Mills, Vaughan Johnson, Pat Swilling, Rickey Jackson, Renaldo Turnbull, Demario Davis
- **CB** Tyrone Hughes, Eric Allen, Bennie Thompson, Dave Waymer, Dave Whitsell, Marshon Lattimore
- **SS** Roman Harper, Sammy Knight, Tom Myers
- **FS** Darren Sharper
- **K** Morten Andersen, Tom Dempsey, Wil Lutz
- **P** Mitch Berger, Brian Hansen, Thomas Morstead
- **RS** Michael Lewis, Deonte Harty, Rashid Shaheed
- **ST** Fred McAfee, J. T. Gray

Two Saints head coaches have participated in the Pro Bowl, Tom Fears in 1970 (1969 season) and Sean Payton in 2007 (2006 season) and 2018 (2017 season).

=== Super Bowl MVPs ===
**Super Bowl MVP winners**
| Super Bowl | Player | Position |
| XLIV | Drew Brees | QB |

=== Walter Payton NFL Man of the Year Awards ===
**Walter Payton NFL Man of the Year Award Winners**
| Year | Player | Position |
| 2006 | Drew Brees | QB |

=== Ring of Honor ===
On October 9, 2013, the Saints announced the creation of a Ring of Honor to commemorate former players, administrators and individuals with significant contributions to the franchise. Their names are displayed along the Caesars Superdome's Terrace Level fascia. The first three honorees were Archie Manning, Rickey Jackson and Willie Roaf and were officially inducted during halftime of the Saints' game against the Dallas Cowboys on November 10, 2013.

Elected to the Pro Football Hall of Fame

New Orleans Saints Ring of Honor
| No. | Name | Position | Tenure | Inducted |
|---|---|---|---|---|
| 8 | Archie Manning | QB | 1971–1982 | 2013 |
| 57 | Rickey Jackson | LB | 1981–1993 | 2013 |
| 77 | Willie Roaf | OT | 1993–2001 | 2013 |
| 7 | Morten Andersen | K | 1982–1994 | 2015 |
| — | Tom Benson | Owner | 1985–2018 | 2019 |
| 91 | Will Smith | DE | 2004–2013 | 2019 |
| 51 | Sam Mills | LB | 1986–1994 | 2021 |
| 73 | Jahri Evans | G | 2006–2015, 2016 | 2024 |
| 9 | Drew Brees | QB | 2006–2020 | 2026 |

=== 45th Anniversary Team ===
To commemorate the club's 45th anniversary, the New Orleans Saints Hall of Fame selected its All-45th Anniversary Team. The Hall of Fame updates its all-time team every five years, and this latest squad of head coach and players features four standouts from the club's roster at the time of selection: QB Drew Brees, G Jahri Evans, and DE Will Smith as well as head coach Sean Payton. Bold indicates those elected to the Pro Football Hall of Fame.

The players are chosen in a vote by the Hall of Fame media selection committee, which includes local and regional media members who cover the Saints now or did so in the past. The All-45th Anniversary Team is as follows, with an asterisk (*) designating those players who have already been inducted into the Hall of Fame:

Offense

- WR – Eric Martin* (1985–1993)
- WR – Joe Horn* (2000–2006)
- C – John Hill* (1975–1984)
- G – Jim Dombrowski* (1986–1996)
- G – Jahri Evans* (2006–2016)
- OT – **Willie Roaf*** (1993–2001)
- OT – Stan Brock* (1980–1992)
- TE – Hoby Brenner* (1981–1993)
- QB – **Drew Brees*** (2006–2020)
- RB – Dalton Hilliard* (1986–1993)
- RB – Deuce McAllister (2001–2009)

Specialists

- K – **Morten Andersen*** (1982–1994)
- P – Tommy Barnhardt (1987, 1989–1994, 1999)
- ST – Fred McAfee* (1991–1993, 2000–2006)
- KR/PR – Michael Lewis* (2001–2006)

Defense

- DE – Wayne Martin (1989–1999)
- DE – Jim Wilks (1981–1993)
- DE – Joe Johnson* (1994–1998, 2000–2001)
- DE – Will Smith (2004–2012)
- LB – **Sam Mills*** (1986–1994)
- LB – Vaughan Johnson* (1986–1993)
- LB – **Rickey Jackson*** (1981–1993)
- LB – Pat Swilling* (1986–1992)
- CB – Dave Waymer* (1980–1989)
- CB – Mike McKenzie (2004–2009)
- S – Tommy Myers (1972–1981)
- S – Sammy Knight (1997–2002)

Coach

- Sean Payton (2006–2021)

* Unanimous selection

=== New Orleans Saints Hall of Fame ===
Elected to the Pro Football Hall of Fame

**New Orleans Saints Hall of Fame**
| Inducted | No. | Name | Position | Tenure |
| 1988 | 8 | Archie Manning | QB | 1971–1982 |
| 1988 | 46 | Danny Abramowicz | WR | 1967–1973 |
| 1989 | 37 | Tommy Myers | S | 1972–1981 |
| 1989 | 19 | Tom Dempsey | K | 1969–1970 |
| 1990 | 17 | Billy Kilmer | QB | 1967–1970 |
| 1991 | 74 | Derland Moore | NT | 1973–1985 |
| 1991 | 34 | Tony Galbreath | RB | 1976–1980 |
| 1992 | 38 | George Rogers | RB | 1981–1984 |
| 1992 | 50 | Jake Kupp | G | 1967–1975 |
| 1992 | 62 | John Hill | C | 1975–1984 |
| 1993 | 58 | Joe Federspiel | LB | 1972–1980 |
| 1994 | — | Jim Finks | GM | 1986–1993 |
| 1994 | 85 | Henry Childs | TE | 1974–1980 |
| 1995 | 82 | Bob Pollard | DE | 1971–1977 |
| 1995 | 81 | Doug Atkins | DE | 1967–1969 |
| 1996 | 23 | Dave Whitsell | CB | 1967–1969 |
| 1996 | 44 | Dave Waymer | S | 1980–1989 |
| 1997 | 57 | Rickey Jackson | OLB | 1981–1993 |
| 1997 | 67 | Stan Brock | OT | 1980–1992 |
| 1998 | 21 | Dalton Hilliard | RB | 1986–1993 |
| 1998 | 51 | Sam Mills | LB | 1986–1994 |
| 1999 | 3 | Bobby Hebert | QB | 1985–1992 |
| 1999 | 84 | Eric Martin | WR | 1985–1993 |
| 2000 | 53 | Vaughan Johnson | LB | 1986–1993 |
| 2000 | 56 | Pat Swilling | ILB | 1986–1992 |
| 2001 | 85 | Hoby Brenner | TE | 1981–1993 |
| 2001 | 94 | Jim Wilks | DE | 1981–1993 |
| 2002 | — | Jim Mora | Coach | 1986–1996 |
| 2002 | 73 | Frank Warren | DE | 1981–1994 |
| 2003 | 93 | Wayne Martin | DE | 1989–1999 |
| 2003 | 72 | Jim Dombrowski | G | 1986–1996 |
| 2004 | 36 | Rueben Mayes | RB | 1986–1991 |
| 2004 | — | Steve Sidwell | Assistant coach | 1986–1994 |
| 2005–2006 ^{1} | 61 | Joel Hilgenberg | C | 1984–1993 |
| 2007 | 94 | Joe Johnson | DE | 1994–2001 |
| 2008 | 77 | Willie Roaf | OT | 1993–2001 |
| 2009 | 7 | Morten Andersen | K | 1982–1994 |
| 2010 | 87 | Joe Horn | WR | 2000–2006 |
| 2011 | 29 | Sammy Knight | S | 1997–2002 |
| 2012 | 26 | Deuce McAllister | RB | 2001–2008 |
| 2012 | — | Tom Benson | Team owner | 1985–2018 |
| 2013 | 97 | La'Roi Glover | DT | 1997–2001 |
| 2014 | 2 | Aaron Brooks | QB | 2000–2005 |
| 2014 | 3 | John Carney | K | 2001–2006; 2009–2010 |
| 2015 | 84 | Michael Lewis | WR | 2001–2006 |
| 2015 | 33 | Tyrone Hughes | CB | 1993–1996 |
| 2016 | 91 | Will Smith | DE | 2004–2013 |
| 2017 | 51 | Jonathan Vilma | LB | 2008–2013 |
| 2017 | 77 | Carl Nicks | G | 2008–2011 |
| 2018 | 16 | Lance Moore | WR | 2005–2013 |
| 2018 | 23 | Pierre Thomas | RB | 2007–2014 |
| 2019 | 25 | Reggie Bush | RB | 2006–2010 |
| 2019 | 12 | Marques Colston | WR | 2006–2015 |
| 2020 | 73 | Jahri Evans | G | 2006–2015 |
| 2020 | 41 | Roman Harper | SS | 2006–2013 |
| 2022 | 19 | Devery Henderson | WR | 2004–2012 |
| 2022 | 25 | Fred McAfee | ST | 1991–1993 2000–2006 |
| 2023 | 32, 33 | Jabari Greer | CB | 2009–2013 |
| 2024 | 9 | Drew Brees | QB | 2006–2020 |
| 2025 | 22 | Tracy Porter | CB | 2008–2011 |
| 2025 | 39 | Brett Maxie | S | 1985–1993 |

^{1} 2005 induction ceremonies postponed to October 27, 2006, due to Hurricane Katrina

=== New Orleans Saints Hall of Fame Courage Award ===
**New Orleans Saints Hall of Fame**
| Inducted | No. | Name | Position | Tenure |
| 2025 | 37 | Steve Gleason | Safety | 2000–2006 |

== Staff ==
=== Current staff ===
New Orleans Saints staff
| Front office: Owner – Gayle Benson; President – Dennis Lauscha; Executive vice president/general manager – Mickey Loomis; Senior VP of football operations/assistant general manager – Khai Harley; Senior VP/assistant general manager – college personnel – Jeff Ireland; Vice president of pro personnel – Michael Parenton; Assistant director of pro scouting - Justin Matthews; Director of football administration – Scott Kuhn; Director of analytics – Zach Stuart; Director of team operations – Derek Stamnos; Senior personnel advisor – Randy Mueller; Consultant - Thomas Dimitroff; Head coaches: Head coach – Kellen Moore; Associate head coach/running backs – Joel Thomas; Assistant to the head coach – Mike Martinez; Offensive coaches: Offensive coordinator – Doug Nussmeier; Run game coordinator – T.J. Paganetti Fired on November 2nd, 2026; Quarterbacks – Scott Tolzien; Wide receivers – Keith Williams; Assistant wide receivers – Kyle Valero; Tight ends – Chase Haslett; Offensive line – Brendan Nugent; Senior offensive assistant – Scott Linehan; Offensive assistant – Tobijah Hughley; Offensive assistant – Will Clapp | Defensive coaches: Defensive coordinator – Brandon Staley; Defensive pass game coordinator – Terry Joseph; Defensive line – Bo Davis; Assistant defensive line – Brian Young; Edges – Jay Rodgers; Linebackers – Peter Sirmon; Assistant linebackers – Adam Gristick; Cornerbacks – Grady Brown; Assistant defensive backs – Robert Blanton; Senior defensive assistant – Peter Giunta; Special teams coaches: Special teams coordinator – Phil Galiano; Assistant special teams – Kyle Wilber; Strength and conditioning: Director of sports science – Ted Rath; Strength and conditioning coach – Matt Clapp; Assistant strength and conditioning – Charles Byrd; Assistant strength and conditioning – Rob Wenning; → Coaching staff → Front office → More NFL staffs |

== Joe Gemelli Fleur-De-Lis Award ==
The Joe Gemelli Fleur-De-Lis Award is given yearly to a person who has contributed to the betterment of the New Orleans Saints organization. The award is named for Joe Gemelli, a New Orleans clothing store owner and an active supporter of sports in the city, who was known as the team's biggest fan.

- 1989: Al Hirt
- 1990: Joe Gemelli
- 1991: Dave Dixon
- 1992: Charlie Kertz
- 1993: Wayne Mack
- 1994: Erby Aucoin
- 1995: Aaron Broussard
- 1996: Marie Knutson
- 1997: Angela Hill
- 1998: Joe Impastato
- 1999: Frank Wilson
- 2000: Bob Remy
- 2001: Peter "Champ" Clark
- 2002: Dean Kleinschmidt
- 2003: Jim Fast
- 2004: Bob Roesler
- 2005–06: Bernard "Buddy" Diliberto (2005 induction ceremonies postponed to October 27, 2006, due to Hurricane Katrina)
- 2007: New Orleans Saints fans
- 2008: Barra Birrcher
- 2009: Jerry Romig
- 2010: Dan "Chief" Simmons and Glennon "Silky" Powell
- 2011: Bruce Miller
- 2012: Jim Henderson
- 2013: Peter Finney
- 2014: Al Nastasi and Tony Piazza
- 2015: Doug Thornton
- 2016: Hokie Gajan
- 2017: Jay Romig
- 2018: Michael C. Hebert
- 2019: Gov. Kathleen Blanco
- 2020: Marco Garcia
- 2023: Steve Paretti and Bob Parkinson
- 2025: Ed Daniels

== Current roster ==
New Orleans Saints roster
| Quarterbacks (QB): 2 Spencer Rattler; 6 Tyler Shough; 11 Zach Wilson; Running backs (RB): 43 CJ Donaldson; 30 Audric Estimé; 3 Travis Etienne; 41 Alvin Kamara; Wide receivers (WR): 19 Barion Brown RS; 18 Bryce Lance; 12 Chris Olave; 0 Jordyn Tyson; 14 Devaughn Vele; Tight ends (TE): 4 Oscar Delp; 87 Noah Fant; 83 Juwan Johnson | Offensive linemen (OL): 71 Kelvin Banks Jr. T; 76 David Edwards G; 75 Taliese Fuaga T; 73 Easton Kilty T; 78 Erik McCoy C; 74 Mason Murphy T; 72 Asim Richards T; 51 Cesar Ruiz G; 66 Will Sherman G; 65 Jeremiah Wright G; Defensive linemen (DL): 97 Khristian Boyd DT; 91 Vernon Broughton DT; 96 Carl Granderson DE; 33 Anfernee Jennings DE; 94 Cameron Jordan DE; 95 John Ridgeway III DT; 93 Nathan Shepherd DT; 98 Tyree Wilson DE; 50 Colby Wooden DT; 99 Chase Young DE | Linebackers (LB): 55 Kaden Elliss; 53 Jaylan Ford; 58 Chris Rumph II; 44 Isaiah Stalbird; 28 Danny Stutsman; 20 Pete Werner; Defensive backs (DB): 23 Julian Blackmon S; 22 Martin Emerson CB; 31 Jordan Howden S; 1 Kool-Aid McKinstry CB; 21 Justin Reid S; 42 Michael Reid S; 25 Decamerion Richardson CB; 29 Quincy Riley CB; 7 Jonas Sanker S; 36 Lorenzo Styles Jr. S; Special teams (ST): 17 Ryan Wright P; 49 Zach Wood LS | Practice squad: 81 Kevin Austin Jr. WR; 40 Fadil Diggs DE; 34 TJ Hall CB; 70 Alan Herron T; 88 Matt Lauter TE; 85 Jalen Moreno-Cropper WR; 56 David Ojabo LB; 38 Jayden Price CB; 47 Jackson Sirmon LB; 39 Charlie Smyth K (IPP); 62 Jay'viar Suggs DT; 13 Cedric Tillman WR; 82 Treyton Welch TE; 26 Zamir White RB; 54 Jonah Williams DE; 79 Alex Wollschlaeger T; Reserve: 90 Bryan Bresee DT (IR); 32 Ty Chandler RB (IR); 80 Moliki Matavao TE (IR); 52 Christen Miller DT (IR); 77 Dillon Radunz G (IR); 64 Nick Saldiveri G (PUP); 84 Stone Smartt TE (PS/I); 15 Mason Tipton WR (PUP); 25 Rejzohn Wright CB (IR) 53 active, 15 practice squad (1 IPP), 9 reserve As of November 14, 2026. Rookies in italics.; Roster; Depth chart; Transactions |

== Cheerleaders ==
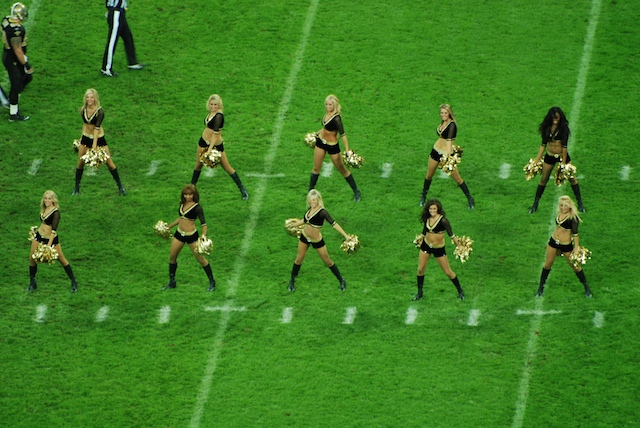
Saintsations performing at halftime

The Saints Cheer Krewe (formerly Saintsations) are the cheerleading squad for the Saints. A cheerleading squad has existed since the franchise's founding. The squad was formerly known as the Saintsations from 1987 to 2021. The current name was adopted in 2021.

== Radio and television ==
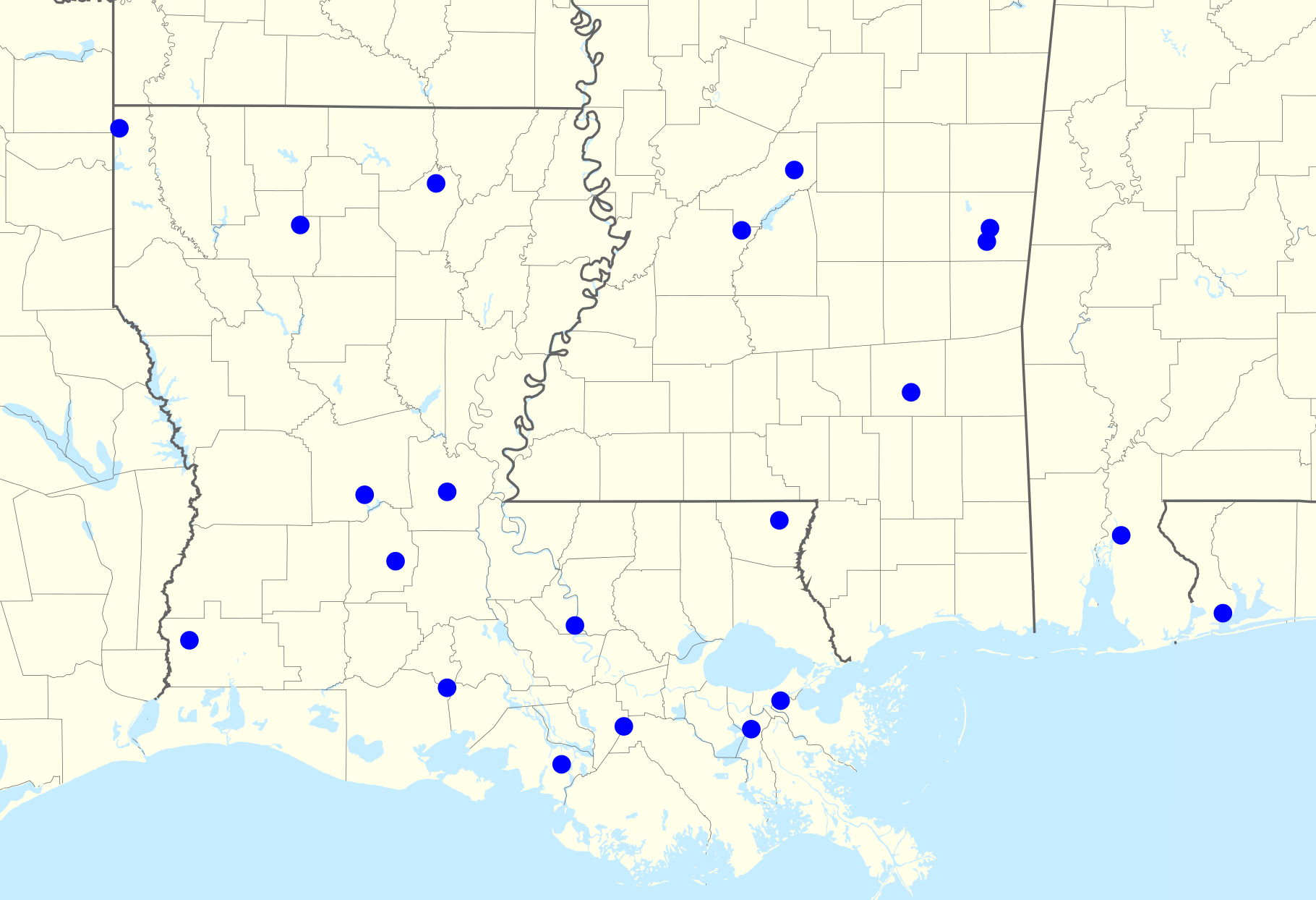
Map of radio affiliates.

The Saints' flagship station is WWL (870 AM/105.3 FM), one of the oldest radio stations in the city of New Orleans and one of the nation's most powerful as a clear-channel station with 50,000 watts of power. Longtime WWL-TV reporter and anchor Mike Hoss is the play-by-play announcer, with former Saints running back Deuce McAllister as color commentator. Hoss succeeded former Saints guard Zach Strief when Strief was named to the Saints' coaching staff in the spring of 2021.

Strief succeeded longtime play-by-play announcer Jim Henderson in 2018, and McAllister succeeded another former Saints running back, Hokie Gajan, in the role after Gajan's death on April 11, 2016, from liposarcoma. Henderson was the play-by-play announcer for Saints radio broadcasts continuously from 1993 to 2017, and previously held the position from 1986 to 1989 after serving as a color commentator from 1981 to 1985, and again in 1992, when Dave Garrett was play-by-play announcer. Previous color commentators include former Saints players Jim Taylor (FB, 1967), Steve Stonebreaker (OLB, 1967–68), Danny Abramowicz (WR, 1967–73), Archie Manning (QB, 1971–82) and Stan Brock (OT, 1980–91).

Most preseason games are televised by WVUE (Channel 8), a station which until its outright 2017 sale to Raycom Media (and subsequent sale in 2019 to Gray Television) was owned by a consortium led by Saints owner Tom Benson since mid-2008 (that consortium, now led by Gayle Benson, continues to hold a minority stake in the station). As the Fox affiliate for New Orleans, it carries the majority of Saints games; WVUE also carries a heavy complement of coach and player shows. Tim Brando and Jon Stinchcomb call the preseason games for the Saints.

Saints preseason games were previously produced by Cox Sports Television. Beginning in the 2015 season, owing to Raycom's management of the station on behalf of Tom Benson's ownership group, production of preseason telecasts were taken over by Raycom Sports under a new multi-year deal, and syndicated to Raycom stations and others around the team's footprint. Regular season games are also aired on WWL-TV, the local CBS station whenever they host an AFC opponent (and games vs. NFC opponents cross-flexed from Fox to CBS) and NBC affiliate WDSU via Sunday Night Football, with the latter also syndicating Monday Night Football games for local airing from sister operation ESPN.

== See also ==
- Religious symbolism in U.S. sports team names and mascots

| Preceded by Pittsburgh Steelers | Super Bowl champions 2009 (XLIV) | Succeeded by Green Bay Packers |
