= 2020 NFL season =

American football season

Regular season
- Duration: September 10, 2020 – January 3, 2021

Playoffs
- Start date: January 9, 2021
- AFC Champions: Kansas City Chiefs
- NFC Champions: Tampa Bay Buccaneers

Super Bowl LV
- Date: February 7, 2021
- Site: Raymond James Stadium, Tampa, Florida
- Champions: Tampa Bay Buccaneers

Pro Bowl
- Site: Virtual (via Madden NFL 21)

AFC teams: West, North, South, East
NFC teams: West, North, South, East

The 2020 NFL season was the 101st season of the National Football League (NFL). The regular season started with the NFL Kickoff Game on September 10, in which the defending Super Bowl LIV champion Kansas City Chiefs defeated the Houston Texans. The playoffs were expanded from 12 to 14 teams, adding a third wild card spot per conference. The season concluded with Tampa Bay defeating Kansas City 31–9 in Super Bowl LV at Raymond James Stadium in Tampa, Florida, on February 7, 2021.

After a decades-long controversy, the Washington Redskins retired the use of their name and logo and adopted the temporary placeholder name Washington Football Team up until their official name change to Washington Commanders for the 2022 season.

The season was impacted by the COVID-19 pandemic; the most prominent changes were the cancellation of all preseason games and the 2021 Pro Bowl, the suspension of international games for the year, an allowance for players to opt out of playing the season without violating their contracts (66 players opted out), the playing of games with either a greatly reduced audience or no fans at all, and the postponement and/or rescheduling of multiple games due to numerous positive COVID-19 tests among players and staff. Despite these changes, all 256 regular season games were played within the original 17-week span with no cancellations.

This was also the final season played under the 16-game schedule, as the schedule was expanded to 17 games in 2021.

== Player movement ==
The 2020 NFL league year and trading period began on March 18. On March 16, teams were allowed to exercise options for 2020 on players with option clauses in their contracts, submit qualifying offers to their pending restricted free agents, and submit a Minimum Salary Tender to retain exclusive negotiating rights to their players with expiring 2019 contracts and fewer than three accrued seasons of free agent credit. Teams were required to be under the salary cap using the "top 51" definition (in which the 51 highest-paid players on the team's payroll must have a combined salary cap). On March 16, clubs were allowed to contact and begin contract negotiations with the agents of players who were set to become unrestricted free agents.

This season's salary cap increased to $198.2 million per team, up from $188.2 million in 2019.

Positions key
Offense	Defense	Special teams
QB — Quarterback; RB — Running back; FB — Fullback; WR — Wide receiver; TE — Tight end; OL — Offensive lineman; T — Tackle; G — Guard; C — Center	DL — Defensive lineman; DT — Defensive tackle (Note: Includes nose tackle (NT)); DE — Defensive end; EDGE — Edge rusher; LB — Linebacker (Note: Includes middle linebacker (MLB/MIKE), weakside linebacker (WILL), strongside linebacker (SAM), off-ball linebacker, and outside linebacker (OLB)); DB — Defensive back; CB — Cornerback; S — Safety (Note: Includes free safety (FS) and strong safety (SS))	K — Kicker (Note: Also known as a placekicker (PK)); P — Punter; LS — Long snapper; RS — Return specialist (Note: Includes kickoff and punt returners)

=== Free agency ===
Free agency began on March 18. Notable players to change teams included:

- Quarterbacks Tom Brady (New England to Tampa Bay), Teddy Bridgewater (New Orleans to Carolina), Andy Dalton (Cincinnati to Dallas), Cam Newton (Carolina to New England), Philip Rivers (Los Angeles Chargers to Indianapolis), and Jameis Winston (Tampa Bay to New Orleans)
- Running backs Leonard Fournette (Jacksonville to Tampa Bay), Melvin Gordon (Los Angeles Chargers to Denver), Frank Gore (Buffalo to New York Jets), Todd Gurley (Los Angeles Rams to Atlanta), Jordan Howard (Philadelphia to Miami), Dion Lewis (Tennessee to New York Giants), Adrian Peterson (Washington to Detroit), LeSean McCoy (Kansas City Chiefs to Tampa Bay)
- Wide receivers Nelson Agholor (Philadelphia to Las Vegas), Robby Anderson (New York Jets to Carolina), Antonio Brown (New England to Tampa Bay), Dez Bryant (New Orleans to Baltimore), Randall Cobb (Dallas to Houston), Phillip Dorsett (New England to Seattle), Ted Ginn Jr. (New Orleans to Chicago), and Emmanuel Sanders (San Francisco to New Orleans)
- Tight ends Eric Ebron (Indianapolis to Pittsburgh), Tyler Eifert (Cincinnati to Jacksonville), Jimmy Graham (Green Bay to Chicago), Austin Hooper (Atlanta to Cleveland), Jordan Reed (Washington to San Francisco), and Jason Witten (Dallas to Las Vegas)
- Offensive linemen Bryan Bulaga (Green Bay to Los Angeles Chargers), Jack Conklin (Tennessee to Cleveland), Ereck Flowers (Washington to Miami), Graham Glasgow (Detroit to Denver), and Halapoulivaati Vaitai (Philadelphia to Detroit).
- Defensive linemen Adrian Clayborn (Atlanta to Cleveland), Jadeveon Clowney (Seattle to Tennessee), Everson Griffen (Minnesota to Dallas), Linval Joseph (Minnesota to Los Angeles Chargers), Gerald McCoy (Carolina to Dallas), Emmanuel Ogbah (Kansas City to Miami), Dontari Poe (Carolina to Dallas), Robert Quinn (Dallas to Chicago), and Danny Shelton (New England to Detroit), Derek Wolfe (Denver to Baltimore)
- Linebackers Vic Beasley (Atlanta to Tennessee), Jamie Collins (New England to Detroit), Leonard Floyd (Chicago to Los Angeles Rams), Dante Fowler (Los Angeles Rams to Atlanta), Bruce Irvin (Carolina to Seattle), A. J. Klein (New Orleans to Buffalo), Nick Kwiatkoski (Chicago to Las Vegas), Cory Littleton (Los Angeles Rams to Las Vegas), Blake Martinez (Green Bay to New York Giants), Joe Schobert (Cleveland to Jacksonville), Kyle Van Noy (New England to Miami), and Nick Vigil (Cincinnati to Los Angeles Chargers)
- Defensive backs Vonn Bell (New Orleans to Cincinnati), James Bradberry (Carolina to New York Giants), Ha Ha Clinton-Dix (Chicago to Dallas), Ronald Darby (Philadelphia to Washington), Kendall Fuller (Kansas City to Washington), Chris Harris Jr. (Denver to Los Angeles Chargers), Malcolm Jenkins (Philadelphia to New Orleans), Byron Jones (Dallas to Miami), Karl Joseph (Oakland to Cleveland), Xavier Rhodes (Minnesota to Indianapolis), Andrew Sendejo (Minnesota to Cleveland), and Desmond Trufant (Atlanta to Detroit)
- Kickers Stephen Gostkowski (New England to Tennessee) and Greg Zuerlein (Los Angeles Rams to Dallas)

=== Trades ===
The following notable trades were made during the 2020 league year:

- March 16: Baltimore traded TE Hayden Hurst and a 2020 fourth-round selection to Atlanta for 2020 second and fifth-round selections.
- March 18: Houston traded WR DeAndre Hopkins and a 2020 fourth-round selection to Arizona for RB David Johnson, a 2020 second-round selection, and a 2021 fourth-round selection.
- March 18: Jacksonville traded DE Calais Campbell to Baltimore for a 2020 fifth-round selection.
- March 18: Minnesota traded WR Stefon Diggs and a 2020 seventh-round selection to Buffalo for 2020 first, fifth, and sixth round selection and a 2021 fourth-round selection.
- March 18: Tennessee traded DE Jurrell Casey to Denver for a 2020 seventh-round selection.
- March 18: San Francisco traded DT DeForest Buckner to Indianapolis for a 2020 first-round selection.
- March 18: Jacksonville traded QB Nick Foles to Chicago for a 2020 fourth-round selection.
- March 18: Carolina traded G Trai Turner to the Los Angeles Chargers for T Russell Okung.
- March 18: Jacksonville traded CB A. J. Bouye to Denver for a 2020 fourth-round selection.
- March 19: Detroit traded CB Darius Slay to Philadelphia for a 2020 third-round selection and 2020 a fifth-round selection.
- April 9: The Los Angeles Rams traded WR Brandin Cooks and a 2022 fourth-round selection to Houston for a 2020 second-round selection.
- April 21: New England traded TE Rob Gronkowski and a 2020 seventh-round selection to Tampa Bay in exchange for a fourth-round selection.
- April 25: Washington traded OT Trent Williams to San Francisco for a 2020 fifth-round selection and a 2021 third-round selection.
- July 25: The New York Jets traded S Jamal Adams and a 2022 fourth-round selection to Seattle for S Bradley McDougald, 2021 and 2022 first-round selections, and a 2021 third-round selection.
- August 30: Jacksonville traded DE Yannick Ngakoue to Minnesota for a 2021 second-round selection and a conditional 2022 fifth-round selection that would have converted to as high as a third-round selection if Ngakoue was voted as a Pro Bowl player and the Vikings won Super Bowl LV, but neither condition was satisfied.
- September 4: Cincinnati traded LB Austin Calitro to Denver for DT Christian Covington.
- September 5: Las Vegas traded WR Lynn Bowden and a conditional 2021 sixth-round selection to Miami for a 2021 fourth-round selection.
- October 22: Minnesota traded DE Yannick Ngakoue to Baltimore for a 2021 third-round selection and a conditional 2022 fifth-round selection which could have become a fourth-round selection.
- October 29: Cincinnati traded DE Carlos Dunlap to Seattle for C B. J. Finney and a 2021 seventh-round selection.
- November 3: San Francisco traded LB Kwon Alexander to New Orleans for LB Kiko Alonso and a conditional 2021 fifth-round selection.

=== Notable retirements ===
The following notable players retired prior to the 2020 season:

- C Travis Frederick – Five-time Pro Bowler and three-time All-Pro (one first-team, two-second-team). Played for Dallas during his entire seven-year career.
- TE Antonio Gates – Eight-time Pro Bowler and five-time All-Pro (three first-team, two-second-team). Played for the San Diego/Los Angeles Chargers during his entire 16-year career.
- LB Luke Kuechly – Seven-time Pro Bowler, seven-time All-Pro (five first-team, two-second-team), 2012 Defensive Rookie of the Year, and 2013 Defensive Player of the Year. Played for Carolina during his entire eight-year career.
- QB Eli Manning – Four-time Pro Bowler, two-time Super Bowl champion and MVP (XLII and XLVI), first overall selection in the 2004 NFL draft, and 2016 Walter Payton Man of the Year. Played for the New York Giants during his entire 16-year career.
- OT Joe Staley – Six-time Pro Bowler and three-time second-team All-Pro. Played for San Francisco during his entire 13-year career.
- CB Aqib Talib – Five-time Pro Bowler, two-time All-Pro (one first-team, one second-team), and Super Bowl 50 champion. Played for Tampa Bay, New England, Denver, and the Los Angeles Rams during his 12-year career.
- FS Eric Weddle – Six-time Pro Bowler and five-time All-Pro (two first-team, three-second-team). Played for the San Diego Chargers, Baltimore, and the Los Angeles Rams during his 13-year career. Weddle later came out of retirement in 2021 to rejoin the Rams.
- G Marshal Yanda – Eight-time Pro Bowler, seven-time All-Pro (two first-team, five second-team), and Super Bowl XLVII champion. Played for Baltimore during his entire 13-year career.

Other retirements

- Mike Adams
- Lorenzo Alexander
- Michael Bennett
- LeGarrette Blount
- Jatavis Brown
- Garrett Celek
- Vernon Davis
- James Develin
- Rhett Ellison
- Ramon Foster
- Rodney Gunter
- Christian Hackenberg
- Wes Horton
- Davon House
- Lamarr Houston
- Tom Johnson
- Jermaine Kearse
- Zach Line
- Kyle Long
- Spencer Long
- Johnny Manziel
- Ron Parker
- Ryan Shazier
- Dion Sims
- Jeremiah Sirles
- Darren Sproles
- Benjamin Watson
- Dustin Woodard

=== Draft ===
The Draft took place on April 23–25, via videoconferencing; it was originally scheduled to take place in Paradise, Nevada, but was moved due to the COVID-19 pandemic. On April 5, the NFL announced that the draft would be held virtually with coaches and GMs conducting it via phone and internet from home due to team facilities also being closed. Goodell unveiled the first-round picks from his home in Bronxville, New York. Cincinnati, by virtue of having the worst record in 2019, held the first overall selection and selected QB Joe Burrow out of LSU.

=== Opt-outs ===
The NFL and the National Football League Players Association (NFLPA) agreed on July 24 to allow players to opt out of playing the season; 66 players opted out by the August 6 deadline. Players who opted out were not paid for the 2020 season, but received a salary advance of $150,000 taken from their 2021 salary. Players who opted out due to medical conditions received a $350,000 stipend which was not taken from their 2021 salary. The following is a list of all players who opted out:

Players who opted out
Name	Position	Team
Geronimo Allison	WR	Detroit
John Atkins	DT	Detroit
Sam Beal	CB	New York Giants
Travis Benjamin	WR	San Francisco
Andrew Billings	DT	Cleveland
Russell Bodine	C	Detroit
Brandon Bolden	RB	New England
Caleb Brantley	DT	Washington
Chandler Brewer	OT	Los Angeles Rams
Maurice Canady	CB	Dallas
Marcus Cannon	OT	New England
Patrick Chung	S	New England
Shon Coleman	OT	San Francisco
Josh Doctson	WR	New York Jets
Drake Dorbeck	OT	Cleveland
Laurent Duvernay-Tardif	G	Kansas City
Ukeme Eligwe	LB	Las Vegas
Drew Forbes	G	Cleveland
Devin Funchess	WR	Green Bay
E. J. Gaines	CB	Buffalo
Marcus Gilbert	OT	Arizona
Eddie Goldman	DT	Chicago
Marquise Goodwin	WR	Philadelphia
Colby Gossett	G	Cleveland
Stephen Guidry	WR	Dallas
Josh Harvey-Clemons	LB	Washington
Dont'a Hightower	LB	New England
Allen Hurns	WR	Miami
Ja'Wuan James	OT	Denver
D. J. Killings	CB	Las Vegas
Leo Koloamatangi	C	New York Jets
Matt LaCosse	TE	New England
Marqise Lee	WR	New England
Star Lotulelei	DT	Buffalo
Jordan Lucas	S	Chicago
Jordan Mack	LB	Carolina
Lerentee McCray	LB	Jacksonville
Anthony McKinney	OT	Tennessee
Rashaan Melvin	CB	Jacksonville
Christian Miller	LB	Carolina
Rolan Milligan	S	Indianapolis
Skai Moore	LB	Indianapolis
C. J. Mosley	LB	New York Jets
Lucas Niang	OT	Kansas City
Jamize Olawale	FB	Dallas
Kyle Peko	DT	Denver
Michael Pierce	DT	Minnesota
Malcolm Pridgeon	G	Cleveland
Isaiah Prince	OT	Cincinnati
Da'Mari Scott	WR	New York Giants
Brad Seaton	OT	Tampa Bay
Andre Smith	OT	Baltimore
Nate Solder	OT	New York Giants
Marvell Tell	CB	Indianapolis
De'Anthony Thomas	WR	Baltimore
Najee Toran	OT	New England
Josh Tupou	OT	Cincinnati
Jeremiah Valoaga	DE	Las Vegas
Eddie Vanderdoes	DT	Houston
Jason Vander Laan	TE	New Orleans
Danny Vitale	FB	New England
Larry Warford	G	Free agent
Chance Warmack	G	Seattle
Cole Wick	TE	New Orleans
Damien Williams	RB	Kansas City
Albert Wilson	WR	Miami
Al Woods	DT	Jacksonville

== Officiating changes ==
Referee Walt Anderson was promoted to NFL senior vice president in charge of the officiating training and development program, a newly created position that works independently from the league's head of officiating, Alberto Riveron. Land Clark was promoted to referee to replace Anderson. Clark previously served as a referee in the Pac-12 Conference before joining the NFL in 2018 as a field judge.

Former coach Perry Fewell was named NFL senior vice president of officiating administration. This position oversees the day-to-day operations of the officiating department and is the primary contact for coaches' and general managers' officiating questions, among other duties.

The NFL and the NFL Referees Association (NFLRA) agreed on August 9 to allow officials to opt out of working the 2020 season. Officials who opted out received a $30,000 stipend and guaranteed job protection for 2021. Five on-field officials – line judge Jeff Bergman, back judge Steve Freeman, field judge Greg Gautreaux, field judge Joe Larrew, and back judge Tony Steratore – opted out for the season by the August 13 deadline.

The following officials were hired:

- Tra Blake (Side Judge)
- Joe Blubaugh (Field Judge)
- Kevin Brown (Replay Official)
- Tyler Cerimeli (Replay Official)
- Michael Dolce (Line Judge)
- Andrew Lambert (Replay Official)
- Frank LeBlanc (Down Judge)
- Jamie Nicholson (Replay Official)
- Clay Reynard (Side Judge)
- Tab Slaughter (Umpire)
- Ross Smith (Replay Official)
- Kevin Stine (Replay Official)

The following officials retired:

- Walt Anderson (Referee)
- Byron Boston (Line Judge)
- Jeff Rice (Umpire)
- Mike Spanier (Down Judge/Line Judge)

== Rule changes ==
=== Permanent changes ===
The following rule changes for the 2020 season were approved at the NFL Owners' Meeting in May:

- Extend defenseless player protection to a punt/kick returner who possesses the ball but has not had time to avoid or ward off impending contact with an opponent.
- Make permanent the expansion of automatic replay reviews to include scoring plays and turnovers negated by a foul, and any successful or unsuccessful try attempt.
- Prevent teams from committing multiple dead-ball fouls in the fourth quarter or in overtime while the clock is running in an attempt to manipulate the game clock. The clock now starts on the snap following a dead-ball foul. This has been referred to as the "Bill Belichick Rule" for his use of this tactic.
- Teams may bring three players back from injured reserve after missing eight games, up from two players.
- The temporary rule change for 2019 allowing for the review of pass interference was not renewed.
- In November, the league passed 2020 Resolution JC-2A, which rewards teams for developing minority candidates for head coach and GM positions. The resolution rewards teams whose minority candidates are hired away for one of those positions with a third-round pick in each of the next two drafts. These picks are at the end of the third round, after standard compensatory picks, and are in addition to the 32 compensatory picks already awarded.

=== Temporary rules for 2020 season ===
The following temporary rule changes were made on September 9 and were only in place for 2020: The rule changes involving injured reserve and practice squad transactions remained in place for 2021.

- A player on injured reserve could return after missing three games, down from eight.
- Teams could return an unlimited number of players from injured reserve throughout the year, instead of the normal limit of three.
- Practice squads included up to 16 players for each team, up from 12.
- After 4:00 p.m. ET on the Tuesday of a game week, a team could designate up to four practice squad players as "protected", meaning they are not allowed to sign with another team until after their current team plays its next game.
- The NFL instituted a reserve/COVID-19 list for players who either test positive for COVID-19 or have been exposed to someone who has it. There was no minimum amount of time a player must remain on this list, only until he was medically cleared to play.
- The NFL administered COVID-19 tests to all players and other essential employees every day of the regular season and postseason except game days.
- Any player who was on a team's Week 1 roster earned an accrued season toward free agency as long as he was on full-pay status for at least one regular-season game, down from the normal minimum of six.
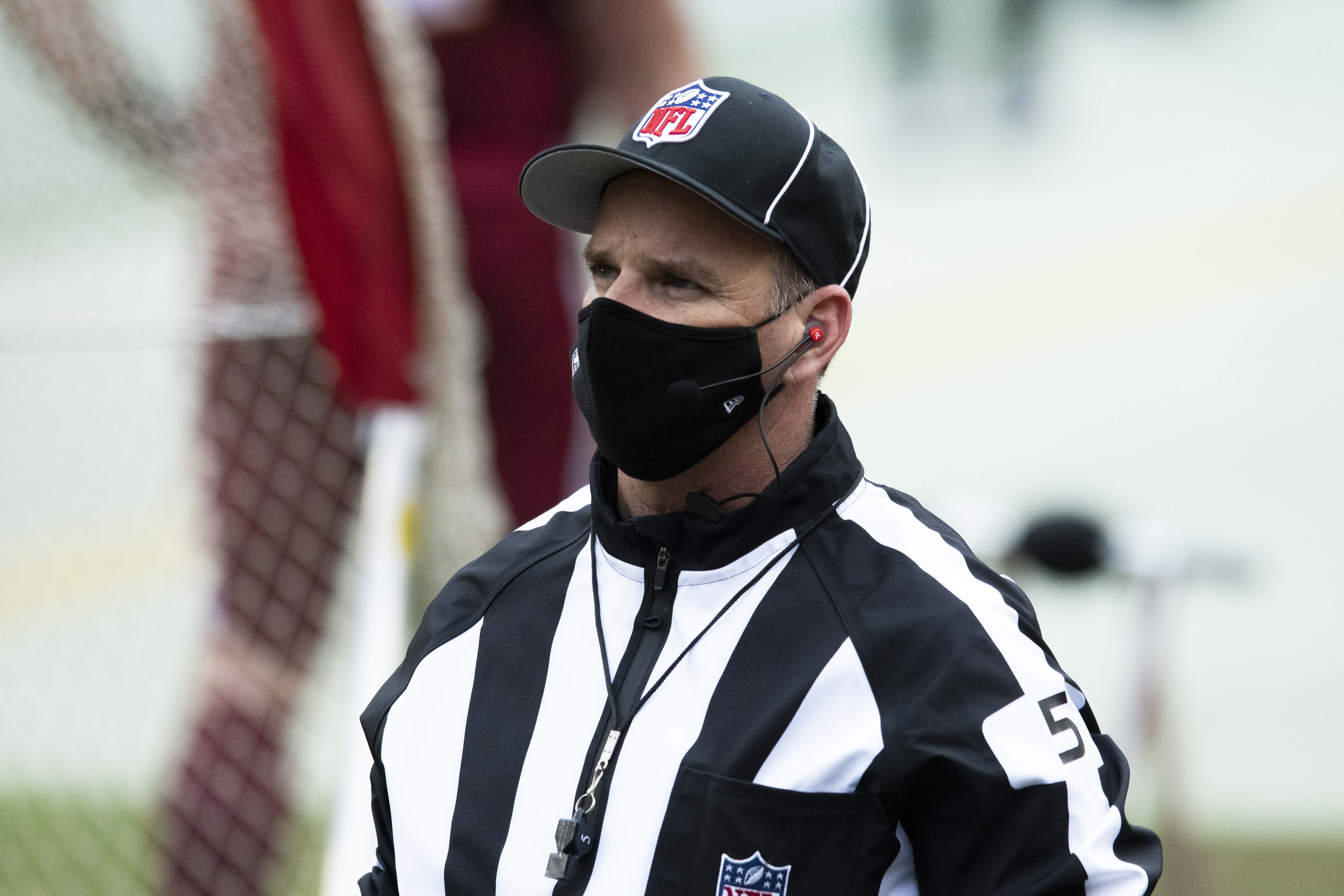
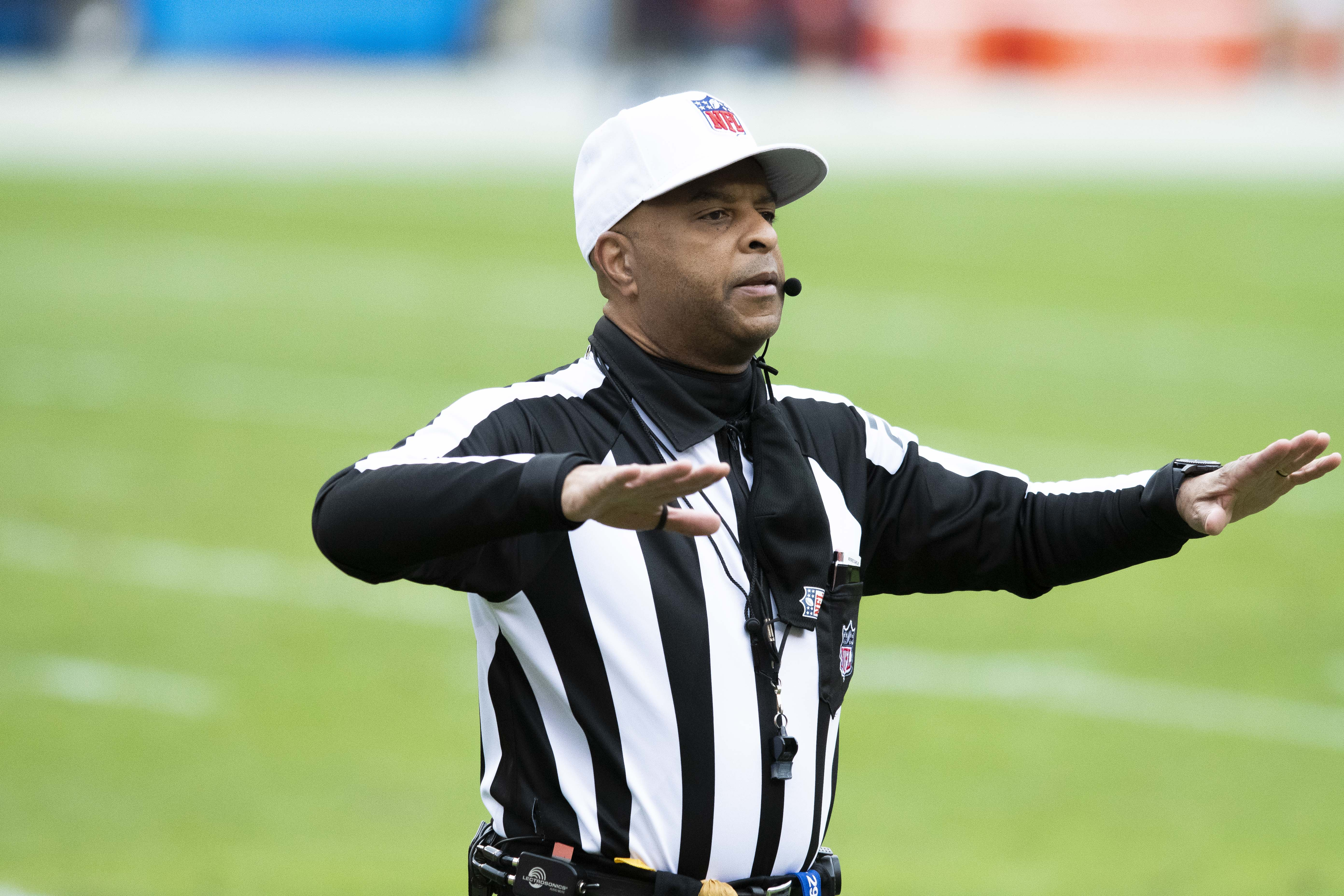
Side Judge Jim Quirk (left) wears a mask during a December game and referee Adrian Hill (right) removes his mask to announce a penalty in the same game.
- Every person at field level had to wear a face covering except players actively involved in the game or warming up on the sideline and referees while making announcements.
- On October 9, the league announced that coaches who approach officials with their faces uncovered could be penalized 15 yards for unsportsmanlike conduct.

== 2020 deaths ==
=== Members of the Pro Football Hall of Fame ===
Herb Adderley
Adderley, a cornerback, spent 12 years in the NFL with the Green Bay Packers and the Dallas Cowboys from 1960 to 1972. He was inducted into the Hall in 1980 and died on October 30, age 81.
Willie Davis
Davis, a defensive end, spent 12 years in the NFL with the Cleveland Browns and the Green Bay Packers from 1958 to 1969. He also served as a color commentator for NBC in the early 1970s and was inducted into the Hall in 1981. He also started All-Pro Broadcasting, which owns several stations in Los Angeles and Milwaukee. Davis died on April 15, age 85.
Fred Dean
Dean, a defensive end, spent 11 years with the San Diego Chargers and San Francisco 49ers from 1975 to 1985. He was inducted into the Hall in 2008 and died on October 14, age 68.
Chris Doleman
Doleman, a defensive end, spent 15 years in the NFL with the Minnesota Vikings, Atlanta Falcons, and San Francisco 49ers. He was inducted into the Hall in 2012 and died January 28, age 58.
Kevin Greene
Greene, a linebacker, played 15 years in the NFL, spending time with the Los Angeles Rams, Pittsburgh Steelers, Carolina Panthers, and San Francisco 49ers. He was inducted into the Hall in 2016 and died December 21, age 58.
Paul Hornung
Hornung, a running back and placekicker, played ten seasons with the Green Bay Packers, and was an inaugural member of the New Orleans Saints roster but never played due to injury. He was inducted into the Hall in 1986 and died November 13, age 84.
Bobby Mitchell
Mitchell, a halfback, spent 11 years in the NFL with the Cleveland Browns and Washington Redskins; he was the first black player on Washington's roster, ending owner George Preston Marshall's 30-year color barrier on the team. He served as an executive with the Redskins for decades after his playing career ended and was inducted into the Hall in 1983. Mitchell died on April 5, age 84.
Ken Riley
Riley, a cornerback, spent his entire 15-year career with the Cincinnati Bengals, was posthumously inducted in 2023. He died June 7, aged 72.
Gale Sayers
Sayers, a running back, spent his entire seven-year career with the Chicago Bears. He was inducted into the Hall in 1977 at the age of 34, the youngest player ever inducted. He died September 23, age 77.
Don Shula
Shula was head coach of the Baltimore Colts and Miami Dolphins for a combined 33 years; he holds the record for both the most regular-season wins by a head coach in NFL history (328) and the most total wins including the playoffs (347). Shula was inducted into the Hall in 1997. He died May 4, age 90.
Willie Wood
Wood, a safety who spent his entire 12-year career with the Green Bay Packers, was inducted into the Hall in 1989. He died February 3, age 83.
Larry Wilson
Wilson spent 13 seasons in the NFL, all with the St. Louis, Phoenix and Arizona Cardinals, between 1960 and 2002: 13 as a player in which he appeared in eight Pro Bowls as a free safety, and 30 as a front office executive. Wilson, a member of the Hall's class of 1978, died September 17, age 82.

=== Others ===
- Joe Beauchamp
- Ed Biles
- Rodger Bird
- Matt Blair
- Sam Boghosian
- Pete Brewster
- Allen Brown
- Barry Brown
- Rush Brown
- Timmy Brown
- Walter Bryan
- Joe Bugel
- Reche Caldwell
- Chuck Crist
- Mike Curtis
- Tom Dempsey
- Larry Eisenhauer
- Jim Fraser
- Jesse Freitas Sr.
- Nesby Glasgow
- Doug Hart
- Carlton Haselrig
- Conway Hayman
- Mario Henderson
- Zac Henderson
- Paul Howard
- Tarvaris Jackson
- Les Josephson
- Jim Kiick
- Jon Kilgore
- Phil Krueger
- Lew Luce
- Benny Malone
- Orlando McDaniel
- Pellom McDaniels
- Howard Mudd
- Ron Marciniak
- Marv Marinovich
- Greg Montgomery
- Derland Moore
- Manfred Moore
- Jack Myers
- Gern Nagler
- Jerry Norton
- Markus Paul
- Ray Perkins
- Dan Radakovich
- Joe Reid
- Pete Retzlaff
- Gloster Richardson
- Tootie Robbins
- Pepper Rodgers
- John Rushing
- Jake Scott
- Goldie Sellers
- Del Shofner
- Mike Stratton
- Jerry Sturm
- Lorenzo Taliaferro
- Terry Tausch
- Roosevelt Taylor
- Max Tuerk
- Ron Widby
- Sam Wyche
- Tom Yewcic
- Mack Yoho
- Jim Youel
- Don Zimmerman
- John Zook

== Preseason ==
Training camps were held from late July through August. By league order, all training camps were held at teams' regular practice facilities.

The Pro Football Hall of Fame Game was scheduled for August 6 between Dallas and Pittsburgh, but was canceled on June 25 due to the pandemic. On July 3, the NFLPA voted to cancel the preseason, which was agreed to by the league later that month.

== Regular season ==
The NFL released its regular-season schedule on May 7. The season was played over a 17-week schedule beginning on September 10. Each of the league's 32 teams played 16 games, with one bye week for each team. The regular season concluded with a full slate of 16 games on January 3, 2021, all of which were intra-division matchups, as it had been since 2010.

The NFL suspended its international games for the season due to travel restrictions imposed because of the pandemic; the league had previously announced that Jacksonville would host two games at Wembley Stadium in London, Atlanta and Miami would each host a game at Tottenham Hotspur Stadium in London, and Arizona would host a game at Estadio Azteca in Mexico City. These games were moved back to the teams' respective home stadiums.

Using contingencies similar to those built into the 2011 schedule in the event that season's lockout lasted into September, the 2020 schedule allowed for the possibility that the season could be delayed and shortened in the event that conditions were unsafe to begin play as scheduled. Every game in Week 2 featured teams that share the same bye week later in the season, which would have allowed these games to be made up on the teams' original byes. Weeks 3 and 4 were set up so that there were no divisional games and that every team at home in Week 3 was away in Week 4 and vice versa. This would have allowed the NFL to cancel these two weeks without eliminating any divisional games and keeping each team's home and away games balanced. These scheduling changes, along with eliminating the week off before the Super Bowl and moving the Super Bowl back three weeks, would have allowed the NFL to play a 14-game schedule beginning October 29 while still playing the Super Bowl in February, allowing as many as the first seven weeks of the season to be lost if needed without having to redo the schedule (moving week 2 games into the bye weeks, canceling weeks 3 and 4, and moving weeks 1, 5, 6, and 7 to the end of the season, while postponing the start of the playoffs four weeks, and moving the Super Bowl back three weeks and having no week off between the conference championship games and Super Bowl).

=== Scheduling formula ===
Under the NFL scheduling formula, each team played the other three teams in its own division twice. In addition, a team played against all four teams in one division from each conference. The remaining two games on a team's schedule were against the two remaining teams in the same conference that finished in the same position in their respective divisions the previous season (e.g., the team that finished fourth in its division will play all three other teams in the conference that also finished fourth). The division pairings for 2020 are as follows:

Intra-conference
AFC East vs AFC West
AFC North vs AFC South
NFC East vs NFC West
NFC North vs NFC South

Inter-conference
AFC East vs NFC West
AFC North vs NFC East
AFC South vs NFC North
AFC West vs NFC South

Highlights of the 2020 season included:

- NFL Kickoff Game: The 2020 season began with the Kickoff Game on Thursday, September 10. Defending Super Bowl LIV champion Kansas City hosted and defeated Houston.
- Thanksgiving: Two games were played on Thursday, November 26, featuring Houston at Detroit and Washington at Dallas, with Houston and Washington winning. Baltimore was scheduled to play at Pittsburgh in the primetime game, but it was postponed to December 2, due to several Ravens players and staff testing positive for COVID-19. This postponement reduced the Thanksgiving slate to two games for the first time since 2005.
- Christmas: As Christmas Eve fell on a Thursday, that week's Thursday Night Football game between Minnesota and New Orleans was instead played as a 4:30 p.m. ET start on Christmas Day, with New Orleans winning. This was the NFL's first Friday game since 2009, which was also a Christmas game.

With the final round of the 2020 Masters Tournament (whose rights are held by CBS) rescheduled from its normal April date to November 15, CBS was not given any 1:00 p.m. ET games that day, which fell during Week 10. CBS was given three games in the 4:05 p.m. ET slot, while Fox was given eight Sunday games, including three AFC-away games which generally air on CBS.

=== Scheduling changes ===
When the entire season schedule was released on May 7, the league announced that in Weeks 15 and 16, two or three of five designated games would be moved to Saturday. A total of four games were broadcast by the NFL Network and one was broadcast by Amazon Prime Video. COVID-19 outbreaks among teams forced the league to reshuffle games across several weeks.

- Week 4:
  - The Pittsburgh–Tennessee game, originally scheduled for October 4 at 1:00 p.m. ET, was postponed to October 25 at 1:00 p.m. ET due to several Tennessee players testing positive for COVID-19.
  - The New England–Kansas City game, originally scheduled for Sunday at 4:25 p.m. ET, was postponed to Monday at 7:05 p.m. ET due to one positive COVID-19 test on each team, remaining on CBS and televised nationally.
  - The scheduled Monday Night Football game on ESPN, Atlanta–Green Bay, was postponed from 8:15 p.m. ET to 9:00 p.m. ET to accommodate the rescheduled New England–Kansas City game.
  - The Indianapolis–Chicago game was moved from 1:00 p.m. ET to 4:25 p.m., remaining on CBS, as a replacement for the New England–Kansas City game in that time slot.
- Week 5:
  - The Denver–New England game, which was originally scheduled for Sunday at 1:00 p.m. ET on CBS, was moved to 4:25 p.m. as part of the NFL's flex scheduling. The game was later postponed to Monday at 5:00 p.m. ET after multiple New England players tested positive for COVID-19. This game was again postponed to October 18 at 1:00 p.m. ET when another New England player tested positive. The game remained on CBS.
  - The Buffalo–Tennessee game, originally scheduled for Sunday at 1:00 p.m. ET was postponed to Tuesday at 7:00 p.m. ET due to several positive COVID-19 tests for Tennessee, remaining on CBS.
- Week 6:
  - The Kansas City–Buffalo game, originally scheduled for Thursday at 8:20 p.m. ET was moved to Monday at 5:00 p.m. ET, remaining on Fox and NFL Network, to avoid a situation in which the Bills would play games two days apart.
  - The New York Jets–Los Angeles Chargers game, originally scheduled for 4:05 p.m. ET was moved to November 22 at 4:05 p.m. ET, remaining on CBS, to accommodate the Week 5 Denver–New England game.
  - The Miami–Denver game, originally scheduled for 4:05 p.m. ET, was moved to November 22 at 4:05 p.m. ET, remaining on CBS, to accommodate Denver–New England.
- Week 7:
  - The Pittsburgh–Baltimore game, originally scheduled for October 25 at 1:00 p.m. ET was rescheduled for November 1 at 1:00 p.m. ET, remaining on CBS, to accommodate the Pittsburgh–Tennessee game from Week 4.
  - The Los Angeles Chargers–Miami game, originally scheduled for Sunday at 1:00 p.m. ET was moved to November 15 at 4:05 p.m. ET, remaining on CBS, to accommodate the Denver–New England game from Week 5.
  - The Tampa Bay–Las Vegas game, originally scheduled for Sunday Night Football, was moved to 4:05 p.m. ET on Fox, due to Las Vegas having multiple positive COVID-19 tests and to ensure a SNF game was available in case this game needed to postponed to a later date. The Seattle–Arizona game, originally scheduled for 4:05 p.m. ET on Fox, was moved to SNF.
- Week 8:
  - The Jacksonville–Los Angeles Chargers game, originally scheduled for Sunday at 4:05 p.m. ET was rescheduled for October 25 at 4:25 p.m. ET, remaining on CBS, to accommodate the Denver–New England game from Week 5.
- Week 10:
  - The New York Jets–Miami game originally scheduled for Sunday at 4:05 p.m. ET was rescheduled for October 18 at 4:05 p.m. ET, remaining on CBS, to accommodate the Denver–New England game from Week 5. This also eliminated an unusual quirk in the schedule that would have had Miami and New York play each other in consecutive games, separated by their bye week.
  - The Cincinnati–Pittsburgh game originally scheduled for Sunday at 1:00 p.m. ET was rescheduled for 4:25 p.m. ET, remaining on Fox.
- Week 11:
  - The Los Angeles Chargers–Denver game, originally scheduled for Sunday at 4:05 p.m. ET was moved to November 1 at 4:05 p.m. ET to accommodate the Denver–New England game from Week 5.
  - The Green Bay–Indianapolis game, originally scheduled for Sunday at 1:00 p.m. ET, was moved to 4:25 p.m. ET, remaining on Fox.
- Week 12:
  - The Baltimore–Pittsburgh game, originally scheduled for Thursday at 8:20 p.m. ET, was postponed three times, ultimately to Wednesday at 3:40 p.m. ET, remaining on NBC, due to several Ravens players and staff testing positive for COVID-19.
- Week 13:
  - To accommodate the postponed Week 12 Baltimore–Pittsburgh game, the Washington–Pittsburgh game, originally scheduled for Sunday at 1:00 p.m. ET, was postponed to Monday at 5:00 p.m. ET, and the Dallas–Baltimore game, originally scheduled for Thursday at 8:20 p.m. ET, was postponed to Tuesday at 8:15 p.m. ET, with both games remaining on Fox.
- Week 14:
  - The Green Bay–Detroit game, originally scheduled for Sunday at 1:00 p.m. ET, was moved to 4:25 p.m. ET, remaining on Fox.
- Week 15:
  - The Cleveland–New York Giants game, originally scheduled for Sunday at 1:00 p.m. ET on CBS, was moved to Sunday Night Football on NBC at 8:20 p.m. ET replacing the originally scheduled San Francisco–Dallas game which was moved to 1:00 p.m. ET on CBS.
  - On November 24, the NFL announced that two games would be moved to Saturday, December 19: Buffalo–Denver at 4:30 p.m. ET and Carolina–Green Bay at 8:15 p.m. ET. The three other games that the NFL had the option of scheduling on Saturday (Detroit–Tennessee, Houston–Indianapolis, and New York Jets–Los Angeles Rams) remained on December 20.
- Week 16:
  - On November 30, the NFL announced that three games would be moved to Saturday, December 26: Tampa Bay–Detroit at 1:00 p.m ET, San Francisco–Arizona at 4:30 p.m, and Miami–Las Vegas at 8:15 p.m. The San Francisco–Arizona game was assigned to Amazon. The two other games the NFL had the option of scheduling on Saturday (Cleveland–New York Jets and Denver–Los Angeles Chargers) remained on December 27.
  - The Cincinnati–Houston game, originally scheduled at 1:00 p.m. ET on CBS, was cross-flexed to Fox, remaining at 1:00.
  - The Chicago–Jacksonville game, originally scheduled at 1:00 p.m. ET on Fox, was cross-flexed to CBS, remaining at 1:00.
  - The Los Angeles Rams–Seattle game, originally scheduled at 4:05 p.m. ET on CBS, was cross-flexed to 4:25 p.m. ET on Fox.
  - The Carolina–Washington game, originally scheduled at 1:00 p.m. ET on CBS, was moved to 4:05 p.m. ET, remaining on CBS.
- Week 17:
  - The Washington–Philadelphia game, originally scheduled for 1:00 p.m. ET on Fox, was selected as the final 8:20 p.m. ET NBC Sunday Night Football game of the season.
  - The Tennessee–Houston and Jacksonville–Indianapolis games, originally scheduled at 1:00 p.m. ET on CBS, were moved to 4:25 p.m. ET, remaining on CBS.
  - The New Orleans–Carolina and Green Bay–Chicago games, originally scheduled at 1:00 p.m. ET on Fox, were moved to 4:25 p.m. ET, remaining on Fox.
  - The Los Angeles Chargers–Kansas City game, originally scheduled at 1:00 p.m. ET on CBS, was cross-flexed to 4:25 p.m. ET on Fox.
  - The Arizona–Los Angeles Rams game was cross-flexed to CBS, remaining at 4:25 p.m. ET.

== Regular season standings ==
=== Division ===
AFC East
	W	L	T	PCT	DIV	CONF	PF	PA	STK
^{(2)} Buffalo Bills	13	3	0	.813	6–0	10–2	501	375	W6
Miami Dolphins	10	6	0	.625	3–3	7–5	404	338	L1
New England Patriots	7	9	0	.438	3–3	6–6	326	353	W1
New York Jets	2	14	0	.125	0–6	1–11	243	457	L1

AFC North
	W	L	T	PCT	DIV	CONF	PF	PA	STK
^{(3)} Pittsburgh Steelers	12	4	0	.750	4–2	9–3	416	312	L1
^{(5)} Baltimore Ravens	11	5	0	.688	4–2	7–5	468	303	W5
^{(6)} Cleveland Browns	11	5	0	.688	3–3	7–5	408	419	W1
Cincinnati Bengals	4	11	1	.281	1–5	4–8	311	424	L1

AFC South
	W	L	T	PCT	DIV	CONF	PF	PA	STK
^{(4)} Tennessee Titans	11	5	0	.688	5–1	8–4	491	439	W1
^{(7)} Indianapolis Colts	11	5	0	.688	4–2	7–5	451	362	W1
Houston Texans	4	12	0	.250	2–4	3–9	384	464	L5
Jacksonville Jaguars	1	15	0	.063	1–5	1–11	306	492	L15

AFC West
	W	L	T	PCT	DIV	CONF	PF	PA	STK
^{(1)} Kansas City Chiefs	14	2	0	.875	4–2	10–2	473	362	L1
Las Vegas Raiders	8	8	0	.500	4–2	6–6	434	478	W1
Los Angeles Chargers	7	9	0	.438	3–3	6–6	384	426	W4
Denver Broncos	5	11	0	.313	1–5	4–8	323	446	L3

NFC East
	W	L	T	PCT	DIV	CONF	PF	PA	STK
^{(4)} Washington Football Team	7	9	0	.438	4–2	5–7	335	329	W1
New York Giants	6	10	0	.375	4–2	5–7	280	357	W1
Dallas Cowboys	6	10	0	.375	2–4	5–7	395	473	L1
Philadelphia Eagles	4	11	1	.281	2–4	4–8	334	418	L3

NFC North
	W	L	T	PCT	DIV	CONF	PF	PA	STK
^{(1)} Green Bay Packers	13	3	0	.813	5–1	10–2	509	369	W6
^{(7)} Chicago Bears	8	8	0	.500	2–4	6–6	372	370	L1
Minnesota Vikings	7	9	0	.438	4–2	5–7	430	475	W1
Detroit Lions	5	11	0	.313	1–5	4–8	377	519	L4

NFC South
	W	L	T	PCT	DIV	CONF	PF	PA	STK
^{(2)} New Orleans Saints	12	4	0	.750	6–0	10–2	482	337	W2
^{(5)} Tampa Bay Buccaneers	11	5	0	.688	4–2	8–4	492	355	W4
Carolina Panthers	5	11	0	.313	1–5	4–8	350	402	L1
Atlanta Falcons	4	12	0	.250	1–5	2–10	396	414	L5

NFC West
	W	L	T	PCT	DIV	CONF	PF	PA	STK
^{(3)} Seattle Seahawks	12	4	0	.750	4–2	9–3	459	371	W4
^{(6)} Los Angeles Rams	10	6	0	.625	3–3	9–3	372	296	W1
Arizona Cardinals	8	8	0	.500	2–4	6–6	410	367	L2
San Francisco 49ers	6	10	0	.375	3–3	4–8	376	390	L1

=== Conference ===
AFC
#	Team	Division	W	L	T	PCT	DIV	CONF	SOS	SOV	STK
Division leaders
1	Kansas City Chiefs	West	14	2	0	.875	4–2	10–2	.465	.464	L1
2	Buffalo Bills	East	13	3	0	.813	6–0	10–2	.512	.471	W6
3	Pittsburgh Steelers	North	12	4	0	.750	4–2	9–3	.475	.448	L1
4 (Note: Tennessee finished ahead of Indianapolis in the AFC South based on division record.)	Tennessee Titans	South	11	5	0	.688	5–1	8–4	.475	.398	W1
Wild cards
5 (Note: Baltimore claimed the No. 5 seed over Indianapolis based on head-to-head victory. Division tiebreaker used to eliminate Cleveland (see below).) (Note: Baltimore claimed the No. 5 seed over Cleveland based on head-to-head sweep.)	Baltimore Ravens	North	11	5	0	.688	4–2	7–5	.494	.401	W5
6 (Note: Cleveland claimed the No. 6 seed over Indianapolis based on head-to-head victory.)	Cleveland Browns	North	11	5	0	.688	3–3	7–5	.451	.406	W1
7	Indianapolis Colts	South	11	5	0	.688	4–2	7–5	.443	.384	W1
Did not qualify for the postseason
8	Miami Dolphins	East	10	6	0	.625	3–3	7–5	.467	.347	L1
9	Las Vegas Raiders	West	8	8	0	.500	4–2	6–6	.539	.477	W1
10 (Note: New England finished ahead of the LA Chargers based on head-to-head victory.)	New England Patriots	East	7	9	0	.438	3–3	6–6	.527	.429	W1
11	Los Angeles Chargers	West	7	9	0	.438	3–3	6–6	.482	.344	W4
12	Denver Broncos	West	5	11	0	.313	1–5	4–8	.566	.388	L3
13	Cincinnati Bengals	North	4	11	1	.281	1–5	4–8	.529	.438	L1
14	Houston Texans	South	4	12	0	.250	2–4	3–9	.541	.219	L5
15	New York Jets	East	2	14	0	.125	0–6	1–11	.594	.656	L1
16	Jacksonville Jaguars	South	1	15	0	.063	1–5	1–11	.549	.688	L15
Tiebreakers (Note: When breaking ties for three or more teams under the NFL's rules, they are first broken within divisions, then comparing only the highest ranked remaining team from each division.)

NFC
#	Team	Division	W	L	T	PCT	DIV	CONF	SOS	SOV	STK
Division leaders
1	Green Bay Packers	North	13	3	0	.813	5–1	10–2	.428	.387	W6
2 (Note: New Orleans finished ahead of Seattle based on conference record.)	New Orleans Saints	South	12	4	0	.750	6–0	10–2	.459	.406	W2
3	Seattle Seahawks	West	12	4	0	.750	4–2	9–3	.447	.404	W4
4	Washington Football Team	East	7	9	0	.438	4–2	5–7	.459	.388	W1
Wild cards
5	Tampa Bay Buccaneers	South	11	5	0	.688	4–2	8–4	.488	.392	W4
6	Los Angeles Rams	West	10	6	0	.625	3–3	9–3	.494	.484	W1
7 (Note: Chicago finished and clinched the 7th and final playoff spot ahead of Arizona based on better win percentage in common games (against Detroit, the NY Giants, Carolina, and the LA Rams, Chicago finished 3–2, while Arizona finished 1–4).)	Chicago Bears	North	8	8	0	.500	2–4	6–6	.488	.336	L1
Did not qualify for the postseason
8	Arizona Cardinals	West	8	8	0	.500	2–4	6–6	.475	.441	L2
9	Minnesota Vikings	North	7	9	0	.438	4–2	5–7	.504	.366	W1
10 (Note: San Francisco finished ahead of the NY Giants based on head-to-head victory. Division tie break was initially used to eliminate Dallas (see below).)	San Francisco 49ers	West	6	10	0	.375	3–3	4–8	.549	.448	L1
11 (Note: NY Giants won tiebreaker over Dallas based on division record.)	New York Giants	East	6	10	0	.375	4–2	5–7	.502	.427	W1
12	Dallas Cowboys	East	6	10	0	.375	2–4	5–7	.471	.333	L1
13 (Note: Carolina finished ahead of Detroit based on head-to-head victory.)	Carolina Panthers	South	5	11	0	.313	1–5	4–8	.531	.388	L1
14	Detroit Lions	North	5	11	0	.313	1–5	4–8	.508	.350	L4
15	Philadelphia Eagles	East	4	11	1	.281	2–4	4–8	.537	.469	L3
16	Atlanta Falcons	South	4	12	0	.250	1–5	2–10	.551	.391	L5
Tiebreakers (Note: When breaking ties for three or more teams under the NFL's rules, they are first broken within divisions, then comparing only the highest-ranked remaining team from each division.)

== Postseason ==
The 2020 playoffs began on the weekend of January 9–10, 2021 with the wild-card round. Under the new NFL Collective Bargaining Agreement (CBA), the playoffs expanded to 14 teams. There were three wild-card teams per conference and only the top seed in each conference received a first-round bye. Three games were played each day.

In the divisional round on January 16–17, the top seed in the conference hosted the worst remaining seed, and the other two remaining teams played each other, with the better seed hosting. The winners of those games advanced to the Conference Championships on for January 24. Super Bowl LV was held February 7 at Raymond James Stadium in Tampa, Florida.

If a COVID-19 outbreak were to force the postponement of playoff games, contingency plans were in place to remove the bye week after the Conference Championships and/or move the Super Bowl back as far as February 28.

The 2021 Pro Bowl was originally scheduled for January 31 at Allegiant Stadium in Paradise, Nevada. However, on October 14, the game was canceled due to COVID-19 concerns. Pro Bowl rosters for the 2020 season were released on December 21, and the league held a virtual event to honor the players chosen. Players selected were used in a broadcast playthrough in the video game Madden NFL 21 instead. This marked the first time since the 1949 season in which a Pro Bowl is not held.

=== Bracket ===
Jan 10 – Nissan Stadium	Jan 16 – Bills Stadium
5	Baltimore	20
4	Tennessee	13
5	Baltimore	3
Jan 24 – Arrowhead Stadium
Jan 9 – Bills Stadium	2	Buffalo	17
AFC
7	Indianapolis	24	2	Buffalo	24
Jan 17 – Arrowhead Stadium
2	Buffalo	27	1	Kansas City	38
AFC Championship
Jan 10 – Heinz Field	6	Cleveland	17
1	Kansas City	22
6	Cleveland	48
Divisional playoffs	Feb 7 – Raymond James Stadium
3	Pittsburgh	37
Wild-card round
A1	Kansas City	9
Jan 9 – FedExField	Jan 17 – Mercedes-Benz Superdome	N5	Tampa Bay	31
Super Bowl LV
5	Tampa Bay	31
4	Washington	23
5	Tampa Bay	30
Jan 24 – Lambeau Field
Jan 10 – Mercedes-Benz Superdome	2	New Orleans	20
NFC
7	Chicago	9	5	Tampa Bay	31
Jan 16 – Lambeau Field
2	New Orleans	21	1	Green Bay	26
NFC Championship
Jan 9 – Lumen Field	6	LA Rams	18
1	Green Bay	32
6	LA Rams	30
3	Seattle	20

== Notable events ==
=== New collective bargaining agreement ===
In March 2020, the NFL and the NFLPA agreed to a new CBA that will run through 2030. The previous CBA, signed in 2011, would have expired after this season.

Major changes in the new CBA include:

- Expanding the playoffs from 12 to 14 teams beginning this season.
- Allowing the league to expand the regular season from 16 to 17 games beginning in 2021 at the earliest, along with a corresponding reduction of the preseason from four games to three. The owners later approved this expansion for the 2021 season.
- Increasing the players' share of the league's overall revenue from 47% to 48% starting in 2021. This was increased to 48.8% following the expansion of the regular season to 17 games.
- Increasing team rosters from 53 to 55 players and game-day rosters from 46 to 48 players, with a minimum of eight offensive linemen. Practice squads increased from 10 to 12 players in 2020 and increased to 14 players in 2022.
- Allowing players to become eligible for pensions after three accrued seasons, down from four.
- Fully guaranteeing fifth-year options for first round picks if picked up by the team. In addition, the fifth year option salary can rise based on the player's performance in his first three seasons. Previously, it was only tied to when he was selected in the draft.
- Shortening the drug test window from four months to two weeks at the start of training camp and eliminating automatic suspensions solely based on positive tests.
- Establishing a "neutral decision-maker" to replace the NFL Commissioner on ruling most discipline cases.
- Improving teams' training facilities and establishing a network of hospitals in teams' home cities with free healthcare for current and former players.

=== Washington Redskins' name change ===
On July 1, following renewed attention to racial justice in wake of the George Floyd protests, a letter signed by 87 shareholders and investors was sent to sponsors of the then-Washington Redskins and NFL including Nike, FedEx, and Pepsi urging them to cut ties unless the team name was changed. Around the same time, several retail companies began to remove Redskins merchandise from their stores. In response, the team underwent a review of its name and logo. On July 23, the team announced that it would retire its name and logo. The team began playing as the "Washington Football Team" pending a permanent name being chosen.

=== Shooting of Jacob Blake ===
In response to the shooting of Jacob Blake, Detroit canceled its scheduled practice on August 25. Nine other teams canceled their scheduled practices on August 27. Several teams that did not cancel practice issued statements about unity. The Jacksonville Jaguars canceled their scheduled afternoon activities.

=== COVID-19 outbreaks ===
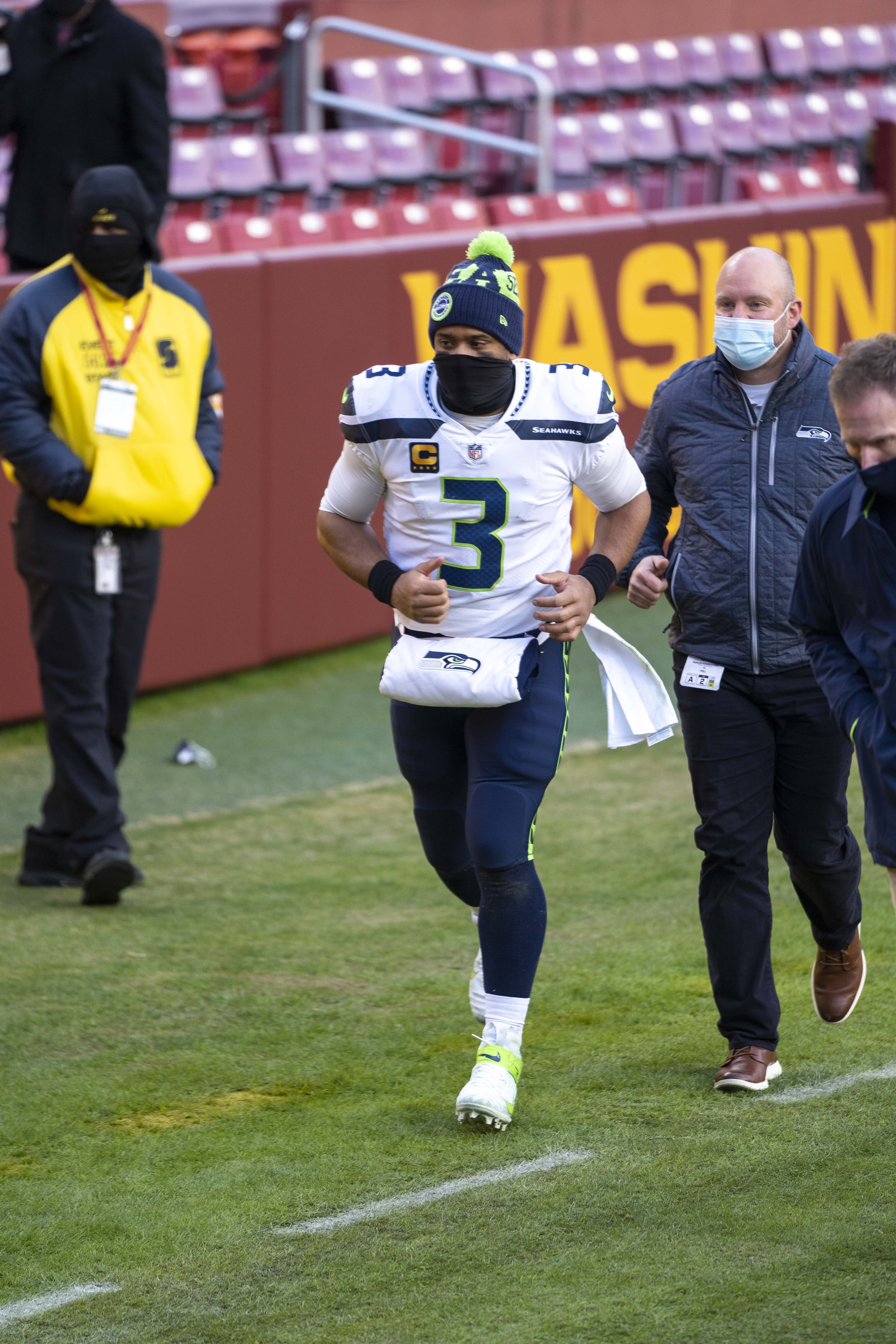
Russell Wilson wearing a mask, as part of COVID-19 precautions.

- On September 30, it was reported that ten Tennessee players and staff members tested positive for COVID-19. Tennessee closed its practice facility through October 3 as the team continued testing and contact tracing. Tennessee's most recent opponent, Minnesota, also closed their facility as a precaution until they received more test results. The league postponed Tennessee's October 4 game against Pittsburgh to October 25 and later postponed their October 11 game against Buffalo to October 13.
- On October 3, it was reported that New England QB Cam Newton and Kansas City practice squad QB Jordan Ta'amu tested positive for COVID-19. The October 4 New England-Kansas City game was postponed to October 5 in order to determine if there were any additional positive tests on either team, which there were not. New England CB Stephon Gilmore tested positive for COVID-19 after this game, resulting in New England's October 11 game against Denver to be postponed initially to October 12, to allow for additional testing and tracing of New England players and staff. After another Patriots player tested positive, the game was postponed again to October 18. This required the league to reschedule six games across multiple weeks affecting Denver, New England, and four other teams.
- On October 21, it was reported that Las Vegas OT Trent Brown tested positive for COVID-19. Five other players, who were close contacts of Brown, were also placed on the COVID-19 reserve list. Las Vegas' game against Tampa Bay was moved out of that week's Sunday Night Football game to ensure another game could be played in this timeslot.
- On October 24, Buffalo tight end Dawson Knox tested positive for the virus. He and three other players, including all of the team's tight ends except Tyler Kroft, were placed on the COVID-19 reserve list. Buffalo played its game against the New York Jets as scheduled, with fullback Reggie Gilliam serving as a backup tight end.
- On November 23, Baltimore running backs Mark Ingram II and J. K. Dobbins both tested positive for COVID-19. Through the rest of the week and into the next week, a total of 18 players either tested positive or had COVID exposures, making them ineligible to play. The Ravens' Thanksgiving night game was delayed three times, to Wednesday afternoon December 2. Others to test positive were QB Lamar Jackson, OL Patrick Mekari, C Matt Skura, FB Patrick Ricard, LS Morgan Cox, TE Mark Andrews, WR Willie Snead, DE Calais Campbell, and NT Brandon Williams. Baltimore's Week 13 matchup against Dallas, originally scheduled for December 3, was then postponed to December 8 due to the Week 12 game against Pittsburgh being postponed to December 2.
- On November 28, Denver quarterbacks Drew Lock, Brett Rypien, and Blake Bortles were ruled ineligible to play for Denver's Week 12 game against New Orleans after coming into close contact with Jeff Driskel who had tested positive for the virus; the team was also unable to sign a replacement free agent quarterback due to inability to clear testing protocols in time. This led to the Broncos elevating wide receiver Kendall Hinton from the practice squad to play quarterback. Hinton went 1/9 with 13 passing yards and two interceptions as the Broncos suffered a blowout loss to the Saints.

Tom Brady Signs with Buccaneers

On March 17, 2020, Legendary Patriots QB Tom Brady signed announced he wouldn’t re-sign with the Patriots, ending his 20 year run with the franchise. Later that day, he announced he would sign with the Tampa Bay Buccaneers. That season, he ended up winning the Super Bowl, beating the Chiefs 31-9. Brady ended up winning MVP of the game.

== Records, milestones, and notable statistics ==
Week 1

- Drew Brees broke the career record for pass attempts with his 10,170th attempt. The previous record of 10,169 attempts was held by Brett Favre.
- Tom Brady became the third player to attempt 10,000 passes, joining Brees and Favre.
- Frank Gore broke the NFL record for the most regular-season games played by a running back, with 227. The previous record of 226 was held by Emmitt Smith.
- Russell Wilson became the second player to pass for at least 30,000 yards and rush for over 4,000 yards in his career, joining Steve Young.
- The Baltimore Ravens set an NFL record by winning their third consecutive season-opener by 30+ points.

Week 2

- Joe Burrow broke the record for most completions in a game by a rookie with 37. The previous record of 36 was shared by Marc Bulger, Chris Weinke, and Carson Wentz.
- Drew Brees became the first player to record 550 career passing touchdowns.
- Tom Brady became the second player to pass for over 75,000 career yards, joining Brees.
- Dak Prescott became the first quarterback to pass for 400 yards and rush for three touchdowns in a game.

Week 3

- Ryan Fitzpatrick became the first quarterback to defeat the same opponent as a member of six different teams after leading Miami to a win over Jacksonville. Fitzpatrick also defeated Jacksonville as a starting quarterback for Cincinnati, Buffalo, Tennessee, Houston, and the New York Jets.
- Philip Rivers became the sixth player to pass for 60,000 career yards.
- Rivers also became the sixth player to record 400 career passing touchdowns.
- Russell Wilson set a record for the most touchdown passes in his team's first three games with 14. The previous record of 13 was held by Patrick Mahomes.
- Wilson also became the fifth player in NFL history to throw for at least five touchdown passes in consecutive games.
- Patrick Mahomes became the fastest player to reach 10,000 career passing yards, doing so in 34 games. The previous record of 36 games was held by Kurt Warner.
- The Atlanta Falcons became the first NFL team to lose two games in a season after leading by at least 15 points entering the fourth quarter.
- The Chicago Bears became the first NFL team to win two games in the same season after trailing by at least 16 points in the fourth quarter.

Week 4

- Tom Brady became the second player to pass for 550 career touchdowns, joining Drew Brees.
- Brady also became the oldest player to throw five touchdown passes in a game at 43 years, 62 days. The record was previously held by Warren Moon who did so at 40 years, 342 days of age.
- Dak Prescott became the first player to record 450+ passing yards in three consecutive games.
- Prescott also set the record for the most passing yards in a two- and three-game stretch, with 974 and 1,424, respectively.
- Lamar Jackson became the fastest quarterback to reach 5,000 career passing yards and 2,000 career rushing yards, doing so in 35 games. The previous record of 39 was held by Michael Vick.
- Joe Burrow became the first rookie to record 300+ passing yards in three consecutive games.
- Aaron Rodgers became the 11th player to complete 4,000 career passes.
- Russell Wilson tied the record for the most touchdown passes in his team's first four games with 16. The record was previously set by Peyton Manning.

Week 5

- Tom Brady became the second player to complete 6,500 career passes, joining Drew Brees.
- Philip Rivers became the fifth player to complete 5,000 career passes.
- Romeo Crennel became the oldest head coach in NFL history at 73 years, 113 days of age. The previous record of 72 years, 318 days was held by George Halas and had stood since 1967.

Week 6

- Ben Roethlisberger passed John Elway for fifth place for wins by a starting quarterback, with 149.

Week 7

- Drew Brees became the first player to complete 7,000 career passes.
- Ben Roethlisberger became the fifth quarterback to win 150 career starts.
- Russell Wilson tied the record for the most touchdown passes in his team's first six games with 22. The record was previously set by Peyton Manning.
- Wilson and Kyler Murray became the first opposing quarterbacks to each record 300 passing yards and 50 rushing yards in the same game.
- The Cleveland Browns and Cincinnati Bengals combined for an NFL record five go-ahead touchdown passes in the fourth quarter of their game.

Week 9

- Patrick Mahomes became the fastest player to reach 100 passing touchdowns, doing so in 40 games. The record was previously held by Dan Marino who did so in 44 games.
- Lamar Jackson tied the record for quarterback win–loss record through 30 games started, at 25–5 (.833). The record was previously set by Marino.
- The Tampa Bay Buccaneers broke the NFL record for the fewest rushing attempts in a game, with five. The previous record of six was shared by four teams.
- The Baltimore Ravens broke the record for most consecutive games scoring 20 or more points, with 31, dating back to 2018. The previous record of 30 was held by the 2012–14 Denver Broncos.

Week 10

- Philip Rivers passed Dan Marino for fifth place on the NFL's career passing yards list.
- Kyler Murray became the first player to record a passing touchdown and a rushing touchdown in five consecutive games.
- Cordarrelle Patterson tied the NFL record with career kickoff return for a touchdown, with eight. The record was previously set by Josh Cribbs and Leon Washington.

Week 12

- Callie Brownson, the Cleveland Browns chief of staff, became the first woman to serve as a position coach in NFL history when she served as interim tight ends coach in the Browns' game.
- Aaron Rodgers became the 11th player to pass for 50,000 career yards.

Week 13

- Philip Rivers became the seventh player to attempt 8,000 passes.
- Aaron Rodgers became the seventh player to pass for 400 touchdowns. He also became the fastest player to reach this mark, doing so in 193 games. The previous record of 205 games was set by Drew Brees.
- Justin Houston tied the NFL record for most forced safeties, with four. This record was previously set by Jared Allen, Doug English, and Ted Hendricks.
- Cole Beasley set the record for most touchdown receptions by a person shorter than 5 feet 9 inches (1.75 m) for whom statistics are available with 33. The previous record of 32 was set by Darren Sproles.

Week 14

- Jamal Adams set the single season record for most sacks by a defensive back with 8.5. The previous record of 8 was set by Adrian Wilson. Adams would end the season with 9.5 sacks.
- The Pittsburgh Steelers broke the record for most consecutive games with at least one sack, with 70, dating back to 2016. The previous record of 69 was held by the 1999–2003 Tampa Bay Buccaneers.
- The Baltimore Ravens and Cleveland Browns tied the NFL record for most combined rushing touchdowns in a game with nine. The record was previously set by two games played in 1922 (Rock Island Independents vs. Evansville Crimson Giants and Racine Legion vs. Louisville Brecks).
- Baker Mayfield became the first quarterback in NFL history to lose two games despite his team scoring 42 points.
- Derrick Henry broke the record for most career games with at least 200 rushing yards and at least two touchdowns, with four. The previous record of three was shared by Jim Brown, Barry Sanders, and LaDainian Tomlinson.

Week 15

- Aaron Rodgers became the first player to throw at least 40 touchdown passes in three separate seasons.
- Matt Ryan passed Fran Tarkenton for 10th place on the all-time career passing touchdowns list.
- Drew Brees passed Anthony Calvillo for most career passing yards in any professional football league, with 79,846. Calvillo passed for 79,816 yards in the Canadian Football League.
- Ben Roethlisberger became the seventh player to pass for 60,000 career yards.
- Roethlisberger also became the sixth player to complete 5,000 career passes.

Week 16

- Drew Brees became the first player to pass for 80,000 career yards.
- Alvin Kamara tied the record for most individual rushing touchdowns in a game, with six. The record was previously set by Ernie Nevers in 1929.
- The Minnesota Vikings and New Orleans Saints tied the NFL record for most combined rushing touchdowns in a game with nine. The record was previously set by two games played in 1922 (Rock Island Independents vs. Evansville Crimson Giants and Racine Legion vs. Louisville Brecks) and a 2020 contest between the Baltimore Ravens and Cleveland Browns.
- Tom Brady became the third quarterback to play in 300 games, joining George Blanda and Brett Favre.
- Justin Herbert broke the record for most touchdown passes by a rookie, with 28. The previous record of 27 was held by Baker Mayfield.
- Travis Kelce set the single-season record for most receiving yards by a tight end, finishing the season with 1,416. The previous record of 1,377 was held by George Kittle.
- Frank Gore became the third player to rush for 16,000 career yards, joining Walter Payton and Emmitt Smith.

Week 17

- Tom Brady set the record for most regular-season starts by a quarterback, with 299. The previous record of 298 was held by Brett Favre.
- Philip Rivers passed Dan Marino for fifth place on the all-time passing touchdowns list.
- Lamar Jackson became the first quarterback to have 1,000 rushing yards in consecutive seasons.
- Derrick Henry became the eighth player to have 2,000 rushing yards in a season.
- Mike Evans became the first player to reach 1,000 receiving yards in each of his first seven seasons.
- Matt Prater set the record for most career field goals of at least 50 yards, with 59. The previous record of 58 was held by Sebastian Janikowski.
- The Washington Football Team tied the 2010 Seattle Seahawks' record for the worst winning percentage by a playoff-qualifying team (7–9 (.438)) and became the first team to reach the playoffs after starting the season with a 2–7 record. None of the 262 previous teams to start a season with a 2–7 record qualified for the playoffs.
- For the first time in NFL history, home teams had a losing record, finishing the year with a record of 127–128–1 (.498).
- The Cleveland Browns qualified for the playoffs for the first time since 2002, ending the NFL's longest active postseason drought at 17 seasons.
- A record 12,692 points were scored across the league during the regular season, with games averaging 49.6 points. The previous record of 11,985 points (46.8 per game) was set in 2013.
- A record 1,473 total touchdowns were scored across the league during the regular season. The previous record of 1,371 was set in 2018.

Wild-card round

- The Cleveland Browns tied the record for the most points in the first quarter of a playoff game, with 28. The record was previously set by the 1969 Oakland Raiders.
- Mike Priefer became the first acting head coach to win a playoff game in NFL history when the Cleveland Browns defeated the Pittsburgh Steelers. Priefer filled in for head coach Kevin Stefanski, who was out due to COVID-19 protocols.
- Ben Roethlisberger recorded his fourth career 500-yard passing game, extending his own record. He also became the second player with 500 passing yards in a postseason game, joining Tom Brady.
- Roethlisberger also set the record for most completions in a game (regular season or postseason), with 47. The previous record of 45 was shared by Drew Bledsoe and Jared Goff.
- Tom Brady became the oldest player to throw a touchdown pass in a postseason game, at 43 years, 159 days old. The record was previously held by George Blanda, who was 43 years, 108 days old.

Divisional Round

- Tom Brady became the oldest player to score a rushing touchdown in a postseason game, at 43 years, 167 days old. The record was previously held by John Elway, who was 38 years, 166 days old.

Super Bowl LV

- The Tampa Bay Buccaneers became the first team to play, and win, a Super Bowl in its home stadium.
- Tom Brady became the first player in NFL history to have 10 Super Bowl appearances.
- Brady became the second quarterback to start a Super Bowl with a team from each conference, joining Craig Morton, and also the first quarterback to win a Super Bowl with a team from each conference.
- Brady became the oldest player to play in a Super Bowl at 43 years, 188 days old. The record was previously held by Matt Stover, who was 42 years, 11 days old in Super Bowl XLIV.
- Brady and Rob Gronkowski set a record for the most playoff touchdowns by passer-receiver tandem with 13. The previous record of 12 was held by Joe Montana and Jerry Rice.
- Bruce Arians became the oldest head coach to win a Super Bowl at 68 years, 127 days old.

== Regular-season statistical leaders ==
Individual
Scoring leader	Younghoe Koo	Atlanta	144
Scoring leader	Daniel Carlson	Las Vegas	144
Scoring leader	Jason Sanders	Miami	144
Most field goals made	Younghoe Koo	Atlanta	37
Touchdowns	Alvin Kamara	New Orleans	21
Rushing	Derrick Henry	Tennessee	2,027
Passing yards	Deshaun Watson	Houston	4,823
Passing touchdowns	Aaron Rodgers	Green Bay	48
Passer rating	Aaron Rodgers	Green Bay	121.5
Pass receptions	Stefon Diggs	Buffalo	127
Pass receiving yards	Stefon Diggs	Buffalo	1,535
Combined tackles	Zach Cunningham	Houston	164
Interceptions	Xavien Howard	Miami	10
Punting	Braden Mann	New York Jets	3,598; avg 43.9
Sacks	T. J. Watt	Pittsburgh	15

== Awards ==
=== Individual season awards ===
The 10th NFL Honors, honoring the best players and plays from the 2020 season, was held on February 6, 2021, at SoFi Stadium in Inglewood, California.

Award	Winner	Position	Team
AP Most Valuable Player	Aaron Rodgers	QB	Green Bay
AP Offensive Player of the Year	Derrick Henry	RB	Tennessee
AP Defensive Player of the Year	Aaron Donald	DT	Los Angeles Rams
AP Coach of the Year	Kevin Stefanski	HC	Cleveland
AP Assistant Coach of the Year	Brian Daboll	OC	Buffalo
AP Offensive Rookie of the Year	Justin Herbert	QB	Los Angeles Chargers
AP Defensive Rookie of the Year	Chase Young	DE	Washington
AP Comeback Player of the Year	Alex Smith	QB	Washington
Pepsi Rookie of the Year	Justin Herbert	QB	Los Angeles Chargers
Walter Payton NFL Man of the Year	Russell Wilson	QB	Seattle
PFWA NFL Executive of the Year	Brandon Beane	GM	Buffalo
Super Bowl Most Valuable Player	Tom Brady	QB	Tampa Bay

=== All-Pro team ===
The following players were named First Team All-Pro by the Associated Press:

Offense
QB	Aaron Rodgers (Green Bay)
RB	Derrick Henry (Tennessee)
WR	Davante Adams (Green Bay); Stefon Diggs (Buffalo); Tyreek Hill (Kansas City)
TE	Travis Kelce (Kansas City)
LT	David Bakhtiari (Green Bay)
LG	Quenton Nelson (Indianapolis)
C	Corey Linsley (Green Bay)
RG	Brandon Scherff (Washington)
RT	Jack Conklin (Cleveland)

Defense
DE	T. J. Watt (Pittsburgh); Myles Garrett (Cleveland)
DT	Aaron Donald (Los Angeles Rams); DeForest Buckner (Indianapolis)
LB	Fred Warner (San Francisco); Bobby Wagner (Seattle); Shaquille Leonard (Indianapolis)
CB	Xavien Howard (Miami); Jalen Ramsey (Los Angeles Rams)
S	Tyrann Mathieu (Kansas City); Minkah Fitzpatrick (Pittsburgh); Budda Baker (Arizona)

Special teams
K	Jason Sanders (Miami)
P	Jake Bailey (New England)
KR	Cordarrelle Patterson (Chicago)
PR	Gunner Olszewski (New England)
ST	George Odum (Indianapolis)
LS	Morgan Cox (Baltimore)

=== Players of the week/month ===
The following were named the top performers during the 2020 season:

Week/ Month	Offensive		Defensive		Special Teams	
Week/ Month	AFC	NFC	AFC	NFC	AFC	NFC
1	Lamar Jackson QB (Baltimore)	Russell Wilson QB (Seattle)	Casey Hayward CB (Los Angeles Chargers)	Ryan Kerrigan DE (Washington)	Daniel Carlson K (Las Vegas)	Thomas Morstead P (New Orleans)
2	Josh Allen QB (Buffalo)	Dak Prescott QB (Dallas)	T. J. Watt LB (Pittsburgh)	Micah Kiser LB (Los Angeles Rams)	Harrison Butker K (Kansas City)	Michael Dickson P (Seattle)
3	Patrick Mahomes QB (Kansas City)	Russell Wilson QB (Seattle)	Xavier Rhodes CB (Indianapolis)	Shaquil Barrett LB (Tampa Bay)	Stephen Gostkowski K (Tennessee)	Matt Prater K (Detroit)
Sept.	Josh Allen QB (Buffalo)	Russell Wilson QB (Seattle)	T. J. Watt LB (Pittsburgh)	Lavonte David LB (Tampa Bay)	Stephen Gostkowski K (Tennessee)	Jack Fox P (Detroit)
4	Joe Mixon RB (Cincinnati)	Tom Brady QB (Tampa Bay)	Myles Garrett DE (Cleveland)	Za'Darius Smith LB (Green Bay)	Brandon McManus K (Denver)	Mike Boone RB (Minnesota)
5	Chase Claypool WR (Pittsburgh)	Kyler Murray QB (Arizona)	Patrick Queen LB (Baltimore)	Aaron Donald DT (Los Angeles Rams)	Jason Sanders K (Miami)	Wil Lutz K (New Orleans)
6	Derrick Henry RB (Tennessee)	Matt Ryan QB (Atlanta)	Calais Campbell DE (Baltimore)	Budda Baker S (Arizona)	Brandon McManus K (Denver)	Cairo Santos K (Chicago)
7	Baker Mayfield QB (Cleveland)	Kyler Murray QB (Arizona)	Jerry Hughes DE (Buffalo)	Devin White LB (Tampa Bay)	Byron Pringle WR/KR (Kansas City)	Johnny Hekker P (Los Angeles Rams)
Oct.	Derrick Henry RB (Tennessee)	Tom Brady QB (Tampa Bay)	Myles Garrett DE (Cleveland)	Budda Baker S (Arizona)	Jason Sanders K (Miami)	Johnny Hekker P (Los Angeles Rams)
8	Patrick Mahomes QB (Kansas City)	Dalvin Cook RB (Minnesota)	Stephon Tuitt DE (Pittsburgh)	Bobby Wagner LB (Seattle)	Jakeem Grant WR/KR (Miami)	Ryan Succop K (Tampa Bay)
9	Josh Allen QB (Buffalo)	Dalvin Cook RB (Minnesota)	Jeffery Simmons DE (Tennessee)	Foyesade Oluokun LB (Atlanta)	Nick Folk K (New England)	Graham Gano K (New York Giants)
10	Ben Roethlisberger QB (Pittsburgh)	DeAndre Hopkins WR (Arizona)	Jeff Heath S (Las Vegas)	Leonard Floyd LB (Los Angeles Rams)	E. J. Speed LB (Indianapolis)	Matt Prater K (Detroit)
11	Deshaun Watson QB (Houston)	Robert Woods WR (Los Angeles Rams)	Olivier Vernon DE (Cleveland)	Brian Burns DE (Carolina)	Rodrigo Blankenship K (Indianapolis)	Tress Way P (Washington)
12	Tyreek Hill WR (Kansas City)	Kirk Cousins QB (Minnesota)	A. J. Klein LB (Buffalo)	Jacob Tuioti-Mariner DT (Atlanta)	Nick Folk K (New England)	Robbie Gould K (San Francisco)
Nov.	Patrick Mahomes QB (Kansas City)	Dalvin Cook RB (Minnesota)	T. J. Watt LB (Pittsburgh)	Cameron Jordan DE (New Orleans)	Jason Sanders K (Miami)	Younghoe Koo K (Atlanta)
13	Josh Allen QB (Buffalo)	Aaron Rodgers QB (Green Bay)	Kyle Van Noy LB (Miami)	Leonard Williams DE (New York Giants)	Gunner Olszewski WR/PR (New England)	Dustin Hopkins K (Washington)
14	Lamar Jackson QB (Baltimore)	Cam Akers RB (Los Angeles Rams)	Kenny Moore II CB (Indianapolis)	Haason Reddick LB (Arizona)	Diontae Spencer WR/PR (Denver)	Tress Way P (Washington)
15	Josh Allen QB (Buffalo)	Kyler Murray QB (Arizona)	DeForest Buckner DT (Indianapolis)	Devin White LB (Tampa Bay)	Tommy Townsend P (Kansas City)	Michael Dickson P (Seattle)
16	Stefon Diggs WR (Buffalo)	Alvin Kamara RB (New Orleans)	Mike Hilton CB (Pittsburgh)	Fred Warner LB (San Francisco)	Jason Sanders K (Miami)	Joseph Charlton P (Carolina)
17	Derrick Henry RB (Tennessee)	Kirk Cousins QB (Minnesota)	Shaquille Leonard LB (Indianapolis)	Leonard Williams DE (New York Giants)	Maxx Crosby DE (Las Vegas)	Ryan Succop K (Tampa Bay)
Dec./Jan.	Josh Allen QB (Buffalo)	Aaron Rodgers QB (Green Bay)	DeForest Buckner DT (Indianapolis)	Chase Young DE (Washington)	Daniel Carlson K (Las Vegas)	Cairo Santos K (Chicago)

Week	FedEx Air Player of the Week	FedEx Ground Player of the Week	Pepsi Zero Sugar Rookie of the Week	Snickers Hungriest Player
1	Russell Wilson (Seattle)	Clyde Edwards-Helaire (Kansas City)	C. J. Henderson CB (Jacksonville)	Josh Jacobs RB (Las Vegas)
2	Josh Allen (Buffalo)	Aaron Jones (Green Bay)	Justin Herbert QB (LA Chargers)	Aaron Jones RB (Green Bay)
3	Russell Wilson (Seattle)	Dalvin Cook (Minnesota)	Brandon Aiyuk WR (San Francisco)	Tyler Lockett WR (Seattle)
4	Tom Brady (Tampa Bay)	Joe Mixon (Cincinnati)	Justin Herbert QB (LA Chargers)	Bradley Chubb LB (Denver)
5	Derek Carr (Las Vegas)	Todd Gurley (Atlanta)	Justin Herbert QB (LA Chargers)	Chase Claypool WR (Pittsburgh)
6	Ryan Tannehill (Tennessee)	Derrick Henry (Tennessee)	Justin Jefferson WR (Minnesota)	A. J. Brown WR (Tennessee)
7	Joe Burrow (Cincinnati)	Jeff Wilson (San Francisco)	Justin Herbert QB (LA Chargers)	Davante Adams WR (Green Bay)
8	Patrick Mahomes (Kansas City)	Dalvin Cook (Minnesota)	Justin Herbert QB (LA Chargers)	not presented
9	Josh Allen (Buffalo)	Dalvin Cook (Minnesota)	Justin Herbert QB (LA Chargers)	Dalvin Cook RB (Minnesota)
10	Ben Roethlisberger (Pittsburgh)	Ronald Jones II (Tampa Bay)	Jedrick Wills OT (Cleveland)	Kyler Murray QB (Arizona)
11	Justin Herbert (LA Chargers)	Derrick Henry (Tennessee)	Justin Herbert QB (LA Chargers)	not presented
12	Patrick Mahomes (Kansas City)	Derrick Henry (Tennessee)	Antonio Gibson RB (Washington)	Nick Chubb RB (Cleveland)
13	Baker Mayfield (Cleveland)	Aaron Jones (Green Bay)	Tua Tagovailoa QB (Miami)	Darren Waller TE (Las Vegas)
14	Drew Lock (Denver)	Derrick Henry (Tennessee)	Tua Tagovailoa QB (Miami)	Haason Reddick LB (Arizona)
15	Josh Allen (Buffalo)	Derrick Henry (Tennessee)	Justin Herbert QB (LA Chargers)	Tony Pollard RB (Dallas)
16	Brandon Allen (Cincinnati)	Alvin Kamara (New Orleans)	A. J. Dillon RB (Green Bay)	not presented
17	Tom Brady (Tampa Bay)	Jonathan Taylor (Indianapolis)	Justin Herbert QB (LA Chargers)	Jonathan Taylor RB (Indianapolis)
POY	Aaron Rodgers (Green Bay)	Derrick Henry (Tennessee)	Justin Herbert QB (LA Chargers)	Kyler Murray QB (Arizona)

Month	Rookie of the Month	
Month	Offensive	Defensive
Sept.	James Robinson RB (Jacksonville)	Antoine Winfield Jr. S (Tampa Bay)
Oct.	Justin Herbert QB (Los Angeles Chargers)	Jeremy Chinn S (Carolina)
Nov.	Justin Herbert QB (Los Angeles Chargers)	Jeremy Chinn S (Carolina)
Dec.	Jonathan Taylor RB (Indianapolis)	Chase Young DE (Washington)

== Head coaching and front office personnel changes ==
=== Head coaches ===
==== Off-season ====
Team	Departing coach	Interim coach	Incoming coach	Reason for leaving	Notes
Carolina Panthers	Ron Rivera	Perry Fewell	Matt Rhule	Fired	Rivera was fired on December 3, 2019, after going 5–7 (.417) in the first 12 games of the season. In 8+ seasons as the Panthers head coach, he went 79–67–1 (.541), with four playoff appearances including three NFC South division titles and one Super Bowl appearance. Fewell, the defensive backs coach, took over on an interim basis and went 0–4 the rest of the season. Rhule, who spent the previous seven seasons as college football head coach of Temple and Baylor with a 47–43 (.522) record, was hired on January 7.
Cleveland Browns	Freddie Kitchens		Kevin Stefanski	Fired	Kitchens was fired on December 29, 2019, after going 6–10 (.375) in one season as head coach. Stefanski, who previously served as the offensive coordinator for the Minnesota Vikings, was hired on January 13. He was on the Vikings staff for 14 years. This was his first head coaching position at any level.
Dallas Cowboys	Jason Garrett		Mike McCarthy	Contract expired	On January 5, the Cowboys announced they would not renew Garrett's contract, which expired January 14. The Cowboys were 85–67 (.559) in 9 1/2 seasons under Garrett, making the playoffs 3 times but never advancing past the divisional round. McCarthy was hired as the Cowboys' new coach on January 6. In 12+ seasons as the Green Bay Packers head coach, he had a record of 135–85–2 (.613) with nine playoff appearances and one Super Bowl title.
New York Giants	Pat Shurmur		Joe Judge	Fired	Shurmur was fired on December 30, 2019, after going 9–23 (.281) in two seasons as the Giants' head coach, with no playoff appearances. Judge was hired on January 8, after serving as the special teams coordinator for the New England Patriots from 2015 to 2019, as well as the wide receivers coach in 2019. This is his first head coaching position at any level.
Washington Football Team	Jay Gruden	Bill Callahan	Ron Rivera	Fired	After an 0–5 start, Gruden was fired on October 7, 2019. He had a 35–49–1 (.418) record for his 5+ season tenure with the organization, with one playoff appearance. Callahan, the team's assistant head coach/offensive line coach, was previously the head coach of the Oakland Raiders in 2002 and 2003, with a record of 15–17 (.469) and one Super Bowl appearance; he finished out the 2019 season with a 3–8 (.273) record. Rivera, who had spent most of the previous nine seasons as head coach of the Carolina Panthers, was hired on January 1, 2020.

==== In-season ====
Team	Departing coach	Reason for leaving	Interim replacement	Notes
Houston Texans	Bill O'Brien	Fired	Romeo Crennel	After an 0–4 start, O'Brien was fired on October 5. He had a 52–48 (.520) record during his 6+ season tenure with the Texans, with four AFC South titles. Crennel, the team's associate head coach, was previously the head coach of the Cleveland Browns and Kansas City Chiefs, with a combined record of 28–55 (.337) and no playoff appearances. At age 73, he is the oldest head coach in NFL history.
Atlanta Falcons	Dan Quinn	Fired	Raheem Morris	After an 0–5 start, Quinn was fired on October 11. He had a 43–42 (.506) record during his 5+ season tenure with the Falcons, with two playoff appearances and one Super Bowl appearance. Morris, the team's defensive coordinator, was previously the head coach of the Tampa Bay Buccaneers, with a record of 17–31 (.354) and no playoff appearances.
Detroit Lions	Matt Patricia	Fired	Darrell Bevell	Patricia was fired on November 28. He had a 13–29–1 (.314) record during his 2+ season tenure with the Lions, with no playoff appearances. Bevell, the team's offensive coordinator, was promoted to interim head coach. This is his first head coaching position.

=== Front office personnel ===
==== Off-season ====
Team	Position	Departing office holder	Incoming office holder	Reason for leaving	Notes
Cleveland Browns	GM	John Dorsey	Andrew Berry	Mutual decision	Dorsey and the Browns parted ways on December 31, 2019, after three seasons. Berry was hired on January 28, 2020, as general manager and executive vice president of football operations. He served as the Philadelphia Eagles' vice president of football operations in 2019, and had worked for the Browns from 2016 to 2018 as vice president of player personnel. At age 32, he is the youngest general manager in NFL history.
Jacksonville Jaguars	EVP-FO	Tom Coughlin	Position eliminated	Fired	Coughlin was fired on December 18, 2019, after three seasons with the Jaguars. The team announced after the season that Coughlin's position will not be filled.
Washington Football Team	President	Bruce Allen	Jason Wright	Fired	Allen was fired on December 30, 2019, after ten years with the team. Wright, a former NFL running back who later served as a partner at the management consulting firm McKinsey & Company, was hired on August 17, 2020. He is the first black team president in NFL history.

==== In-season ====
Team	Position	2020 office holder	Reason for leaving	Interim replacement	Notes
Houston Texans	GM	Bill O'Brien	Fired	Jack Easterby	O'Brien was named general manager of the team during the 2020 offseason, after splitting general manager duties with Easterby, the executive vice president of football operations, and other team executives in 2019. His tenure was lowlighted by trading away star WR DeAndre Hopkins. Easterby took over GM duties for the rest of the season.
Atlanta Falcons	GM	Thomas Dimitroff	Fired	None	After an 0–5 start, Dimitroff was fired on October 11 after 12 seasons.
Detroit Lions	GM	Bob Quinn	Fired	None	Quinn was fired on November 28 after 5 seasons. A combination of front office personnel handled GM duties for the remainder of the season.
Jacksonville Jaguars	GM	David Caldwell	Fired	Trent Baalke	Caldwell was fired on November 29 after 8 seasons. Baalke, the team's director of player personnel, would serve as interim GM through the end of the season.
Carolina Panthers	GM	Marty Hurney	Fired	None	Hurney was fired on December 21 after 14+ seasons in two stints (2002–12, 2017–20). In his time with the Panthers he was responsible for drafting star players such as Cam Newton, Luke Kuechly, and Thomas Davis.

== Stadiums ==
=== Stadium changes ===
- This was the first season that the Los Angeles Chargers and Los Angeles Rams shared SoFi Stadium in Inglewood, California. The Rams had played at Los Angeles Memorial Coliseum from 2016 to 2019 and the Chargers had played at Dignity Health Sports Park from 2017 to 2019. SoFi Stadium became the fourth stadium since the 1970 AFL–NFL merger to be shared by two teams (Shea Stadium, Giants Stadium and MetLife Stadium, all of which have been shared by the New York Jets and New York Giants, are the other three). It was also the first stadium in the Rams' long history specifically designed and built for the team.
- The Las Vegas Raiders relocated from Oakland to the Las Vegas area and began playing their home games at Allegiant Stadium in Paradise, Nevada.
- Prior to this season, the Buffalo Bills had a buyout window in their lease with their home stadium. On January 31, the team formally declined the buyout option. Since the Bills chose not to opt out, the team cannot exit the lease until it expires at the end of the 2022 season.
  - On July 15, New Era Cap Company canceled its naming rights agreement on the Bills' stadium due to overall financial struggles. The stadium was renamed "Bills Stadium" for the 2020 season and will retain that name until a new sponsor is found.
- This was the last season in which Mercedes-Benz owned the naming rights sponsor for the New Orleans Saints's Louisiana Superdome.
- On November 19, the Seattle Seahawks' CenturyLink Field was renamed Lumen Field after CenturyLink rebranded to Lumen Technologies.

=== COVID-19 restrictions ===
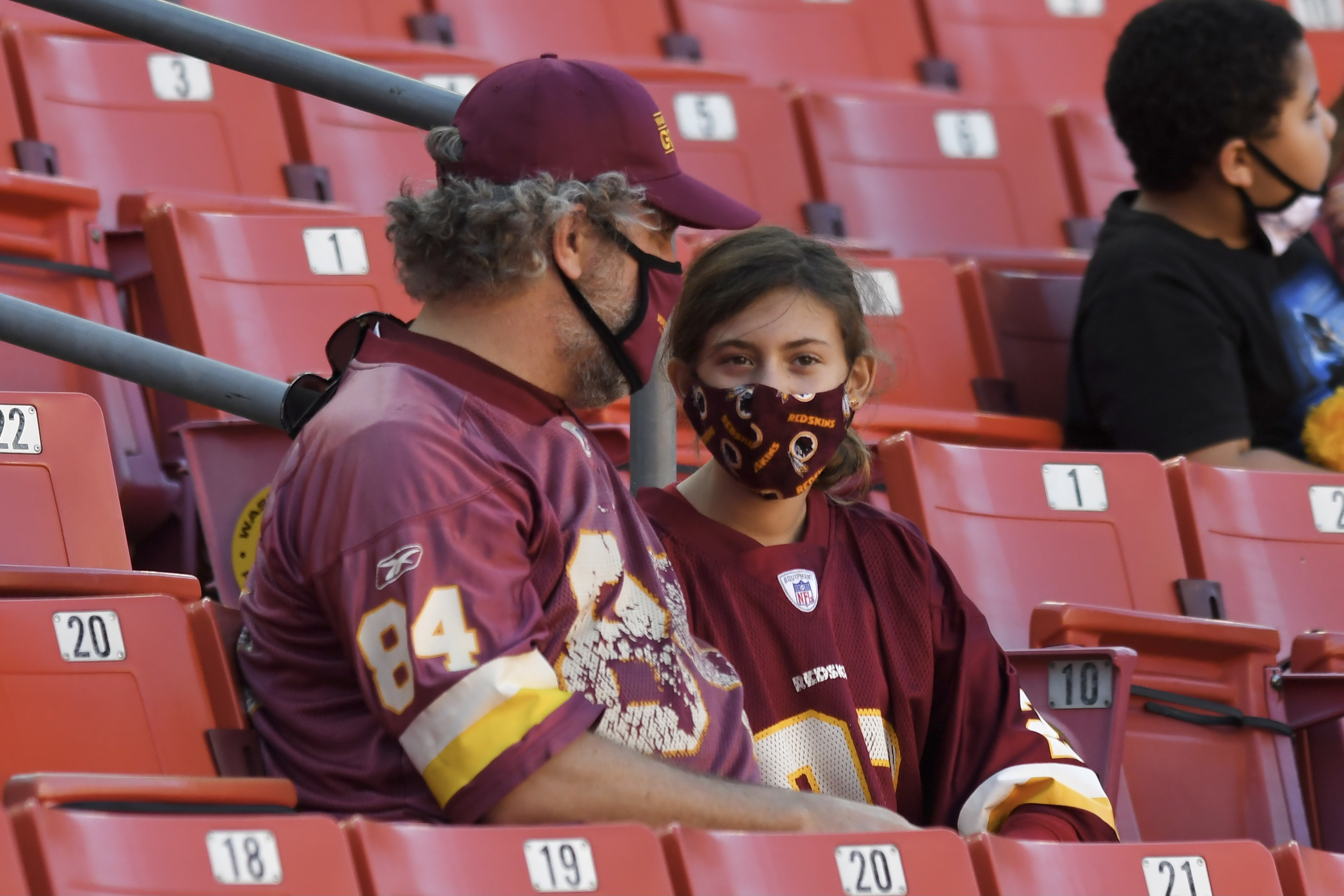
Washington fans in November 2020

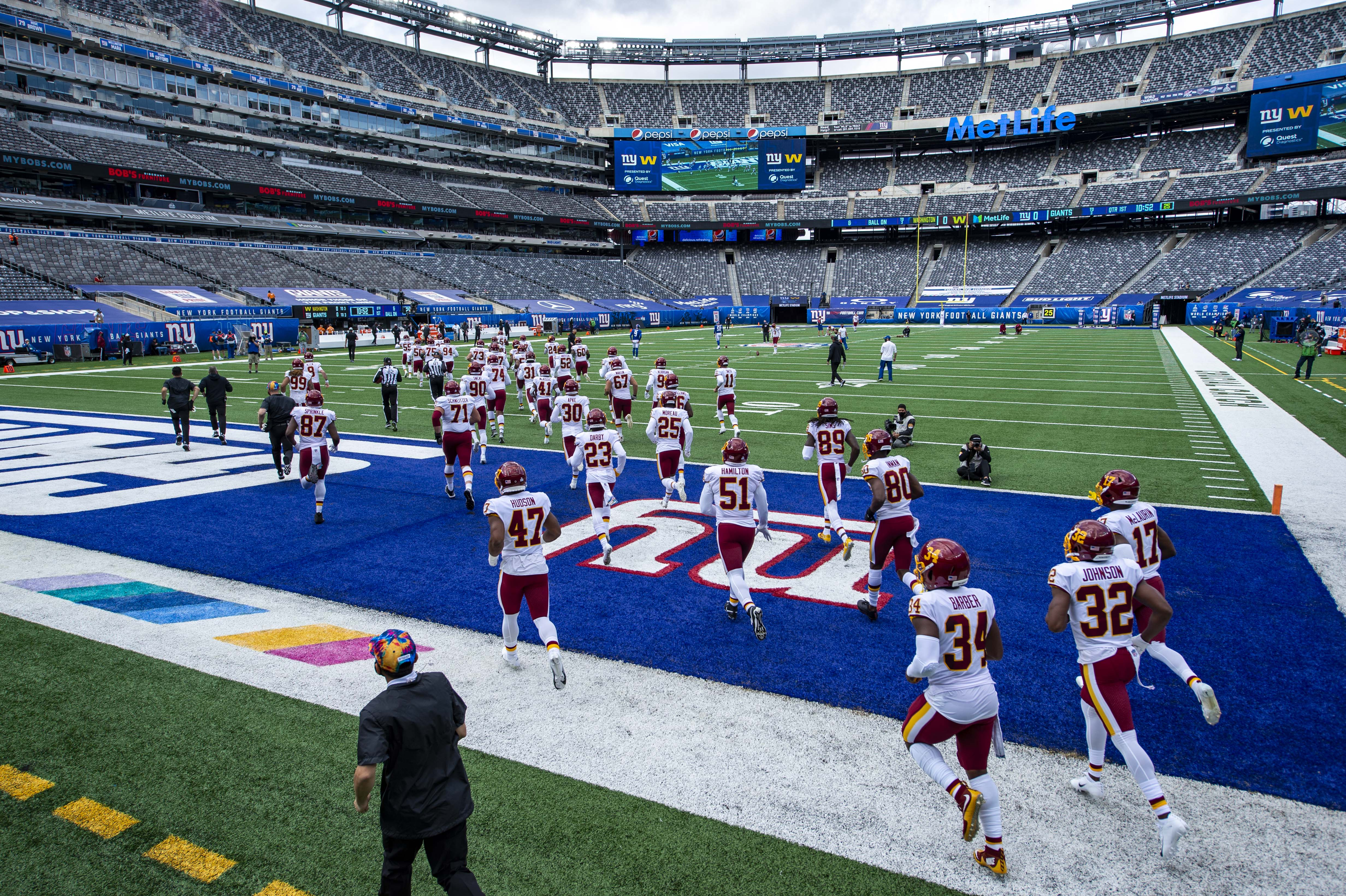
MetLife Stadium without fans in October 2020

The NFL allowed teams to admit spectators to games if allowed under local health orders. A total of 19 teams admitted spectators at a reduced capacity for at least one regular season home game. Two additional teams which did not admit spectators during the regular season admitted spectators for postseason games. Six teams allowed spectators for all home games. The majority of teams played without spectators through September and into October while admitting spectators later in the season. Commissioner Roger Goodell and the league's competition committee assessed that having spectators did not create a competitive advantage despite some coaches and executives disagreeing.

If spectators were admitted, they had to wear face masks and, in some stadiums, were required to sign a liability waiver. On-field entertainment was prohibited, including cheerleaders, mascots, marching bands, flag wavers, and end zone-to-end zone American flag displays. To reduce the proximity of spectators to the field, the league required the first six to eight rows of seats to be blocked with tarps. Halftime shows could be held, but only off-site, or as done on Thanksgiving, pre-recorded before the game.

On May 13, California officials indicated that they might not allow the Los Angeles Chargers, Los Angeles Rams or San Francisco 49ers to play at their home stadiums. Las Vegas' Allegiant Stadium and Arizona's State Farm Stadium were listed as possible relocation sites for these teams. All three teams were ultimately allowed to begin the season at their home stadiums without spectators; however, the 49ers were forced to move their final three home games to State Farm Stadium after Santa Clara County, where the 49ers' home stadium is located, banned all contact sports in response to a local rise of COVID-19 cases.

The NFL initially mandated the use of artificial crowd noise inside all stadiums with attendance below 10,000, consisting of non-dynamic ambience played at 70 decibels. The audio was monitored by the league and teams were subject to sanctions if they were found to have manipulated it (such as by changing its volume). On September 25, these rules were adjusted, allowing the ambiance to be played at up to 80 decibels. The volume must be determined before the game and remain consistent through the entire game. The minimum attendance required to turn off the crowd noise was reduced to 2,500. As part of Microsoft's sponsorship of the NFL, a "Fan Mosaic" feature powered by Microsoft Teams was featured on stadium video boards during select games.

Team	Home games with spectators allowed	Limitations	Source
Arizona	2	Played its first three home games behind closed doors; admitted up to 1,200 fans for next two games; played its last three regular season home games behind closed doors.	
Atlanta	6	Played its Week 1 home opener behind closed doors and hosted 500 family members and associates in Week 3 in order to determine the capacity limit for the team's remaining games. Allowed up to 10,000 spectators for each additional home game.	
Baltimore	1	Played its first three home games behind closed doors; allowed up to 3,000 spectators during Week 8. Spectators were again prohibited from attending games starting Week 11.	
Buffalo	0*	New York state health orders prohibited spectators at sporting events during the regular season. Local officials recommended a 10% capacity, up to 7,000 fans; Governor of New York Andrew Cuomo indicated initial willingness to approve the plan if social distancing is upheld but eventually ruled out spectators after a rise in cases. After Buffalo clinched a home playoff game and cases began to subside, Cuomo gave approval for Buffalo to host 6,772 fans in its two home playoff games, with social distancing measures in place, pre-game rapid antigen testing mandatory at spectator expense, and no repeat attendees.	
Carolina	7	Played behind closed doors for its home opener; admitted up to 5,240 spectators (7% capacity) for the remainder of the season.	
Chicago	0		
Cincinnati	7	Played without spectators in its home opener, then admitted up to 6,000 spectators for its next home game and 12,000 for each remaining home game.	
Cleveland	8	Admitted 6,000 spectators for its first two home games and 12,000 for each remaining home game.	
Dallas	8	Allowed up to 20,000 fans—25% of AT&T Stadium's seating capacity.	
Denver	4	Played with a limited crowd of 500 family members and associates during its home opener. The team allowed up to 5,700 spectators (7.5% of Empower Field at Mile High's seating capacity) for the next four home games, but reverted to playing without spectators for the final three home games due to a rise in COVID-19 cases in Colorado.	
Detroit	0		
Green Bay	0*	Played behind closed doors the entire regular season. Allowed 9,000 spectators for its two home playoff games.	
Houston	7	Played behind closed doors for its Week 2 home opener; allowed up to 13,300 spectators (20% capacity) for remaining home games.	
Indianapolis	8	Allowed 2,500 spectators for its home opener. Allowed spectators at 15% capacity for remaining home games.	
Jacksonville	8	Allowed spectators at 25% capacity.	
Kansas City	8*	Allowed spectators at 22% capacity.	
Las Vegas	0	Las Vegas was the only team to rule out spectators for the entire season before the season started.	
Los Angeles Chargers	0		
Los Angeles Rams	0		
Miami	8	The team admitted 13,000 spectators for each home game. On October 7, Governor of Florida Ron DeSantis gave clearance to allow full attendance in stadiums; however, the Dolphins chose to maintain the 13,000 fan limit.	
Minnesota	0	Played behind closed doors for the entire season, though the team admitted a limited number of family members and team staff beginning in Week 3.	
New England	0		
New Orleans	5*	Played behind closed doors for its first three home games. Louisiana gave approval for the Saints to have fans in the Mercedes-Benz Superdome starting with Week 3; however, the city denied the Saints permission to have fans for its next two games. The Saints were allowed to have up to 3,000 fans beginning in Week 7. This was increased to 6,000 for Weeks 10 and 11 but reverted to 3,000 for the rest of the season.	
New York Giants	0	MetLife Stadium prohibited spectators at sporting events per an executive order from Governor of New Jersey Phil Murphy.	
New York Jets	0	MetLife Stadium prohibited spectators at sporting events per an executive order from Governor of New Jersey Phil Murphy.	
Philadelphia	3	Played its first two home games behind closed doors. The team allowed 7,500 fans beginning with Week 6 for the following three home games. Beginning in Week 12, games were played without spectators again after the city of Philadelphia imposed restrictions on crowd sizes on November 16.	
Pittsburgh	3	Played its first two home games behind closed doors; Allowed up to 5,500 fans from Weeks 5–10. Beginning in Week 12 (originally Week 13), games were played without spectators again as the state of Pennsylvania passed new restrictions on large gatherings. The state authorized up to 2,500 people (including players, in-game staff, and spectators) for playoff games, but due to this limitation the team announced on January 7 that attendance would be limited to family and associates only.	
San Francisco	0	Played behind closed doors for the entire season. On November 28, Santa Clara County banned all contact sports, including 49ers practices and games, in the county, forcing the relocation of the team's final three home games to State Farm Stadium in Glendale, Arizona, which were also played without spectators.	
Seattle	0		
Tampa Bay	7*	Played its Week 2 home opener behind closed doors. For Week 4, only season-ticket holders who had season tickets since 1998 (the first season the Bucs played at Raymond James Stadium) or earlier were allowed to attend. Beginning in Week 6, spectator capacity was limited to 25%. For Super Bowl LV, the stadium had a 34% capacity (25,000 spectators), with 7,500 tickets reserved for vaccinated health care workers.	
Tennessee	7*	Played behind closed doors for its home opener, then allowed a limited amount of spectators – between 10 and 15% capacity – for its remaining home games.	
Washington	1	Played the first four home games behind closed doors, then allowed up to 3,000 season ticket holders to attend its Week 9 game. Spectators were again prohibited from attending games starting Week 11.	
* The team admitted spectators to its home playoff game(s).

== Uniforms ==
=== Uniform changes ===
Eight teams unveiled uniform changes, ranging from minor adjustments to full rebrands.

- Atlanta: On April 8, the Falcons unveiled new uniforms, featuring a matte shell helmet, a larger helmet logo, silver facemasks, new fonts for the numbers, and a prominent "ATL" placed above the numbers. The team returned to black as the primary jersey color. A new alternate jersey features a red gradient.
- Cleveland: On April 15, the Browns revealed new uniforms that reverted to the design used prior to 2015, albeit with an updated nameplate font and number design. Some elements of the 2015 style were retained, including the brighter shade of orange, the modernized version of block numbers, and brown facemasks.
- Indianapolis: On April 13, the Colts announced that serifs were added to their jersey numbers similar to the design used in the 1950s and 1960s and revealed a new modernized wordmark and secondary logo that features the outline of Indiana carved out of a "C". They also introduced a new color, anvil black.
- Los Angeles Chargers: On March 24, the Chargers announced that they would eliminate navy blue from their official branding, building on their 2019 change of the primary jersey color to powder blue. They also debuted a modified logo and a new wordmark to reflect this. On April 21, the Chargers revealed new uniforms, which use elements from previous sets, including numbers on the helmets and the addition of a navy blue alternate set.
- Los Angeles Rams: On March 23, the Rams unveiled new logos and color scheme. The new colors are brighter shades of the royal blue and gold used on their 1999 throwback jerseys, dubbed "Rams Royal" and "Sol" by the team, respectively. The team's new logo features a stylized "LA" with a ram's horn spiraling out from the top of the "A". The team unveiled new uniforms on May 13. Notable features include the addition of an off-white "Bone" away jersey, team wordmark logo patches on the right side of the chest and a unique fabric for the numbers. The helmet also has a metallic "Rams Royal" colored shell and a new ram horn design to match the logos.
- New England: The Patriots former all-blue alternate design became the primary home uniform set, with updated block letters and numbers and blue/red/white socks. A corresponding white jersey was also unveiled and will also be paired with the blue pants. Both uniforms feature truncated shoulder striping as a nod to the "Pat Patriot" uniforms.
- Tampa Bay: On April 7, the Buccaneers unveiled new uniforms resembling the ones used from 1997 to 2013, including that design's block numbers, black masks, pewter pants, and all-white road set. Some elements of the previous design remain, including the enlarged flag-and-crossed-swords logo and the secondary ship logo on the sleeves. The team also unveiled an all-pewter alternate uniform.
- Washington: On July 23, the franchise announced it would play the season as the "Washington Football Team" and dropped the Redskins logo while retaining the color scheme. The team's uniforms essentially remained the same, but without the helmet stripe and with the logo being replaced by the player's jersey number in gold, as well as a "Washington" wordmark on the chest replacing "Redskins". In December the team began wearing white jerseys over white pants on the road for the first time since 2009.

=== Patches ===
- Arizona: A patch to commemorate the death of Hall of Famer Larry Wilson, with his number 8 enclosed in either a black circle (red and white jersey) or white circle (black jersey).
- Dallas: An "Established in 1960" patch to commemorate the 60th anniversary of the team's inception.
- Las Vegas: A patch to commemorate the team's first season in Las Vegas.
- Miami: A patch to commemorate the death of Hall of Fame head coach Don Shula, featuring his name and the number 347 to signify his NFL record career wins.
- New York Jets: A patch to commemorate the death of philanthropist Betty Wold Johnson, the mother of Jets CEO Christopher Johnson.
- Washington: A patch to commemorate the death of Hall of Famer Bobby Mitchell, with his number 49 enclosed in a black circle.

== Media ==
=== Broadcast rights ===
==== Television ====
This was the seventh year under the current broadcast contracts with CBS, ESPN/ABC, Fox, and NBC. This includes "cross-flexing" (switching) Sunday afternoon games between CBS and Fox before or during the season, regardless of the conference of the visiting team. NBC continues to air Sunday Night Football and the Kickoff Game. ESPN continued to air Monday Night Football and a wild-card game, with 3 MNF and the wild-card games being simulcast on ABC. ESPN and ABC were also scheduled to air the 2021 Pro Bowl, but the game was canceled. Fox continues to air Thursday Night Football alongside NFL Network, Amazon Prime Video and Twitch.

CBS and NBC acquired rights to the two new wild-card-round games, with each paying around $70 million for the additional game, with the former producing a youth-oriented alternate broadcast on sister station Nickelodeon.

CBS televised Super Bowl LV in English with ESPN Deportes aired the game in Spanish. NBC was originally scheduled to broadcast the game under the current rotation. However, NBC traded the game to CBS in exchange for Super Bowl LVI, which will fall during the 2022 Winter Olympics, the first to be scheduled during an ongoing Olympic Games (NBC also holds the U.S. broadcast rights to the Olympics).

To coincide with the 50th anniversary of Monday Night Football, ESPN simulcast the Week 2 New Orleans–Las Vegas game as an ESPN Megacast on ABC, marking ABC's first regular season broadcast since 2005. ESPN2 aired an alternate broadcast with various guests joining throughout the game. As mentioned above, two more MNF games were simulcast on ABC on December 7 and 28.

As of the 2019 season, local stations in markets with NFL teams have been allowed on to air another NFL game opposite the game involving that city's home team on a limited basis. Cities were initially limited to two such games per season. This was expanded to four in 2020.

Prior to this season, the league had the option to cancel DirecTV's exclusive contract to air NFL Sunday Ticket, the league's out-of-market sports package. However, the NFL did not opt out.

In the United Kingdom, Sky Sports renewed its broadcast rights to the NFL under a five-year deal, marking its 25th season of coverage. It also announced that it would devote its multiplex channel Sky Sports Action exclusively to NFL programming and coverage during the season, temporarily rebranding it as Sky Sports NFL. It marks the first time that the NFL has partnered on a league-oriented channel in an international market. ViacomCBS-owned free-to-air channel Channel 5 also acquired rights to air Monday Night Football, marking the league's return to the network for the first time since 2009. Channel 5 aired a Los Angeles-based studio show featuring Maurice Jones-Drew, and a weekly magazine show, NFL End Zone, hosted by Cori Yarckin; both programs were produced by ViacomCBS's branded content studio Velocity.

==== Digital ====
On April 29, Amazon renewed its digital rights to Thursday Night Football through the 2022 season, maintaining the existing arrangement to simulcast the 11 games aired by Fox on Amazon Prime Video and for free on Twitch, and offer alternative broadcasts of the games on the two services. It also added exclusive worldwide rights to one late-season game for this season, which was produced by CBS and simulcast on over-the-air stations in the two teams' home markets. Amazon also acquired rights to simulcast one of the wild-card games assigned to CBS.

This season, the TNF games included a new "Scout's Feed" broadcast featuring extended play analysis by Bucky Brooks and Daniel Jeremiah, and a new "NFL Next Live" feed on Twitch hosted by Cari Champion and Andrew Hawkins which featured viewer interactivity. The British English broadcasts were dropped this season. For supplemental content, Amazon is expanding its Tuesday-night studio program NFL Next, and introducing two new interactive programs on Twitch – the Hawkins and Kyle Long-hosted NFL Comment Box, and the Chad Johnson and Kyle Long-hosted The NFL Machine, which features presentations of content from the NFL Films archives.

=== Personnel ===
Tony Romo, CBS' lead color commentator, renewed his contract in a long-term, $17 million per-year deal, the most lucrative contract for a commentator in NFL history.

CBS parted ways with #2 commentator Dan Fouts and replaced him with Fox's #2 commentator Charles Davis. Fox utilized Daryl Johnston in this spot.

To reduce his workload and travel, NBC Sunday Night Football lead commentator Al Michaels took several games off in favor of Mike Tirico.

ESPN replaced its former Monday Night Football commentator team of Joe Tessitore and Booger McFarland with Steve Levy, Brian Griese, and Louis Riddick. Levy and Griese had been a broadcast team for ESPN's college football coverage prior to their Monday Night Football assignment, Levy also served as ESPN's lead XFL play-by-play voice. Fellow college football announcing duo Chris Fowler and Kirk Herbstreit called the first game of the Week 1 MNF doubleheader. Herbstreit also worked the ESPN2 Monday Night Megacast broadcast with Rece Davis during the Week 2 MNF game.

After using a homophobic slur during a Cincinnati Reds game, Thom Brennaman was removed from Fox's NFL broadcasts for 2020. Brennaman, who also worked for the Reds, was suspended from doing games "until further notice". He later resigned from that role. Kevin Kugler replaced Brennaman.

This was the final season for Chris Spielman at Fox. Before Week 14, he left Fox to take a front office position with the Detroit Lions, effective immediately. #6 Brock Huard, who was a new addition to Fox's Sunday commentator roster, would move up to the #5 slot with Kevin Kugler to replace Spielman.

This was also the final season for long-time announcer Dick Stockton, who announced his retirement on March 25, 2021. Stockton, whose broadcasting resume spanned over five decades, called NFL games for CBS and Fox during his career.

=== Impact of COVID-19 on production ===
Broadcasters were limited to 46 staff members at each game. Sideline reporters were not allowed on the field. CBS, Fox, and NBC had commentators on-site, but some production was conducted remotely from the networks' headquarters. The NFL required personnel returning from outside of the United States to quarantine for 14 days before returning to work.

The league provided an enhanced artificial crowd noise track to be used by its broadcasters, separate from the crowd noise that is used at stadiums below 2,500 in attendance. The soundtrack uses crowd audio collected by NFL Films from past games involving the home team, including general ambience, team-specific chants, and contextual reactions. It is mixed by a local sound engineer at the stadium in synchronization with the game. Fox had explored the possibility of masking empty stands with CGI crowds. Fox introduced such a system on-air for its Major League Baseball broadcasts, and later announced that it would use the technology for selected NFL games. NBC ruled out virtual fans, citing the large number of camera angles that would have to be configured. NBC added a 180-degree 8K resolution camera to the Skycam unit for "intimate" overhead views, supplanting wide-angle shots that would expose stands with little to no spectators. At games played with no spectators, CBS allowed its Skycam to be in positions over the stands that are not generally allowed in order to provide new angles.

The pandemic also affected pre-game shows: ESPN's Monday Night Countdown and NFL Network's NFL GameDay were broadcast from their respective networks' studios, rather than traveling to game sites. Fox NFL Sunday panelist Jimmy Johnson contributed from his home in Florida, rather than join the rest of the panel at the Fox studio in Los Angeles. As a precautionary measure, the normal panelists for Fox NFL Kickoff and Fox NFL Sunday did not appear in-studio for Week 11, with Chris Myers, Reggie Bush, and Charles Woodson replacing them, and the regular personnel appearing remotely.

Two commentators were unable to pass their network's COVID-19 protocols and each had to miss one game: Al Michaels for NBC in Week 15 and Tony Romo for CBS in Week 17.

=== Most watched regular season games ===
- DH = doubleheader; SNF = Sunday Night Football; MNF = Monday Night Football; TNF = Thursday Night Football

Rank	Date	Matchup			Network	Viewers (millions)	TV rating	Window	Significance
1	November 26, 4:30 ET	Washington Football Team	41–16	Dallas Cowboys	Fox	30.3	12.0	Thanksgiving	Cowboys–Washington rivalry
2	September 13, 4:25 ET	Tampa Bay Buccaneers	23–34	New Orleans Saints	Fox	25.9	13.1	Late DH^{[a]}	Buccaneers–Saints rivalry, Tom Brady's Buccaneers debut
3	November 22, 4:25 ET	Green Bay Packers	31–34	Indianapolis Colts	Fox	23.9	12.7	Late DH^{[b]}	
4	November 26, 12:30 ET	Houston Texans	41–25	Detroit Lions	CBS	23.4	10.6	Thanksgiving	
5	November 29, 4:25 ET	Kansas City Chiefs	27–24	Tampa Bay Buccaneers	CBS	23.1	12.8	Late DH^{[c]}	
6	January 3, 2021, 4:25 ET	Green Bay Packers	35–16	Chicago Bears	Fox	23.0	12.2	Late DH^{[d]}	Bears–Packers rivalry
7	December 20, 4:25 ET	Kansas City Chiefs	32–29	New Orleans Saints	CBS	22.9	12.7	Late DH^{[e]}	
8	October 25, 4:25 ET	San Francisco 49ers	33–6	New England Patriots	CBS	22.9	12.4	Late DH^{[f]}	Jimmy Garoppolo's return to New England
9	October 11, 4:25 ET	New York Giants	34–37	Dallas Cowboys	CBS	22.8	12.2	Late DH^{[g]}	Cowboys–Giants rivalry
10	September 27, 4:25 ET	Dallas Cowboys	31–38	Seattle Seahawks	Fox	22.8	11.8	Late DH^{[h]}	2018 NFC wild-card rematch

*Note – Late DH matchups listed in table are the matchups that were shown to the largest percentage of the market.

1. TB/NO was shown in 91% of the markets during the late doubleheader time slot of Fox coverage.
2. GB/IND was shown in 83% of the markets during the late doubleheader time slot of Fox coverage.
3. KC/TB was shown in 100% of the markets during the late doubleheader time slot of CBS coverage.
4. GB/CHI was shown in 76% of the markets during the late doubleheader time slot of Fox coverage.
5. KC/NO was shown in 100% of the markets during the late doubleheader time slot of CBS coverage.
6. SF/NE was shown in 50% of the markets during the late doubleheader time slot of CBS coverage.
7. NYG/DAL was shown in 86% of the markets during the late doubleheader time slot of CBS coverage.
8. DAL/SEA was shown in 72% of the markets during the late doubleheader time slot of Fox coverage.
