= List of NFL mascots =

The majority of teams in the National Football League (NFL) have mascots, which typically appear at football games alongside their respective team. These mascots are also used in the teams' official merchandise.

American Football Conference
Team	Mascot(s)	Photo	Description
Baltimore Ravens	Edgar, Allen, and Poe		Named after the famous Poet who used to live in Baltimore. Hence the name Ravens.
Buffalo Bills	Billy Buffalo		An 8-foot tall buffalo.
Cincinnati Bengals	Who Dey		An orange Bengal tiger-like figure
Cleveland Browns	Chomps, Brownie the Elf	Brownie the Elf (left) and Chomps (right)	Chomps is a dog-like figure, based on the team's Dawg Pound section at Cleveland Browns Stadium;
Denver Broncos	Miles, Thunder II	Miles Thunder II	Miles is a white, horse-like anthropomorphic figure wearing an orange jersey; Thunder II is an Arabian horse.
Houston Texans	Toro		A dark blue bull-like figure
Indianapolis Colts	Blue		A blue, horse-like figure
Jacksonville Jaguars	Jaxson de Ville		A jaguar-like figure
Kansas City Chiefs	K. C. Wolf	K. C. Wolf	K.C. Wolf is a grey-colored wolf-like figure
Las Vegas Raiders	Raider Rusher		A caricature of a football player wearing a spiked Raiders helmet.
Los Angeles Chargers	None		
Miami Dolphins	T. D.		A dolphin-like figure
New England Patriots	Pat Patriot		A caricature of a patriot from the American Revolution; named after the nickname of the team's original logo.
New York Jets	None		
Pittsburgh Steelers	Steely McBeam		A burly steelworker with a Bill Cowher-like jutting chin, wearing a hard hat; based on the Steelers' pre-Steelmark logo in the 1950s-early 1960s.
Tennessee Titans	T-Rac		A raccoon, the state animal of Tennessee
Houston Oilers	The Roughneck		
National Football Conference
Team	Mascot(s)	Photo	Description
Arizona Cardinals	Big Red		A red cardinal-like figure
Atlanta Falcons	Freddie Falcon		A caricature of a falcon
Carolina Panthers	Sir Purr		A black panther-like figure
Chicago Bears	Staley Da Bear		A bear-like figure; named after team founder A. E. Staley
Dallas Cowboys	Rowdy		A caricature of a cowboy
Detroit Lions	Roary		A caricature of a lion
Green Bay Packers	None		
Los Angeles Rams	Rampage		A caricature of a ram
Minnesota Vikings	Viktor		Viktor is a smiling Viking caricature whose head looks similar to the Vikings logo. Previously, Ragnar was one of two "human" mascots in professional North American sports (i.e. not in any animal or caricature costume), with Lucky the Leprechaun of the Boston Celtics being the other. Ragnar was dressed as a Viking, but in 2015 did not renew his contract.
New Orleans Saints	Gumbo, Sir Saint	Gumbo	A dog-like figure named after gumbo
New York Giants	None		
Philadelphia Eagles	Swoop, Air Swoop	Swoop	Swoop is an eagle-like figure. Air Swoop is an air-filled eagle caricature similar to Swoop appearance-wise.
San Francisco 49ers	Sourdough Sam		A caricature of a 49er, inspired by prospectors who went to California during the California Gold Rush (1848–1855)
Seattle Seahawks	Blitz; Boom; Taima	Blitz	Blitz and Boom are large blue anthropomorphic birds; Taima is an augur hawk, sometimes thought to be an osprey but actually a buteo
Tampa Bay Buccaneers	Captain Fear		A caricature of a pirate
Washington Commanders	Major Tuddy		A pig inspired by the Hogs, Washington's famed offensive line of the 1980s

== See also ==
- List of mascots
