= Sourdough Sam =

Mascot for the NFL's San Francisco 49ers

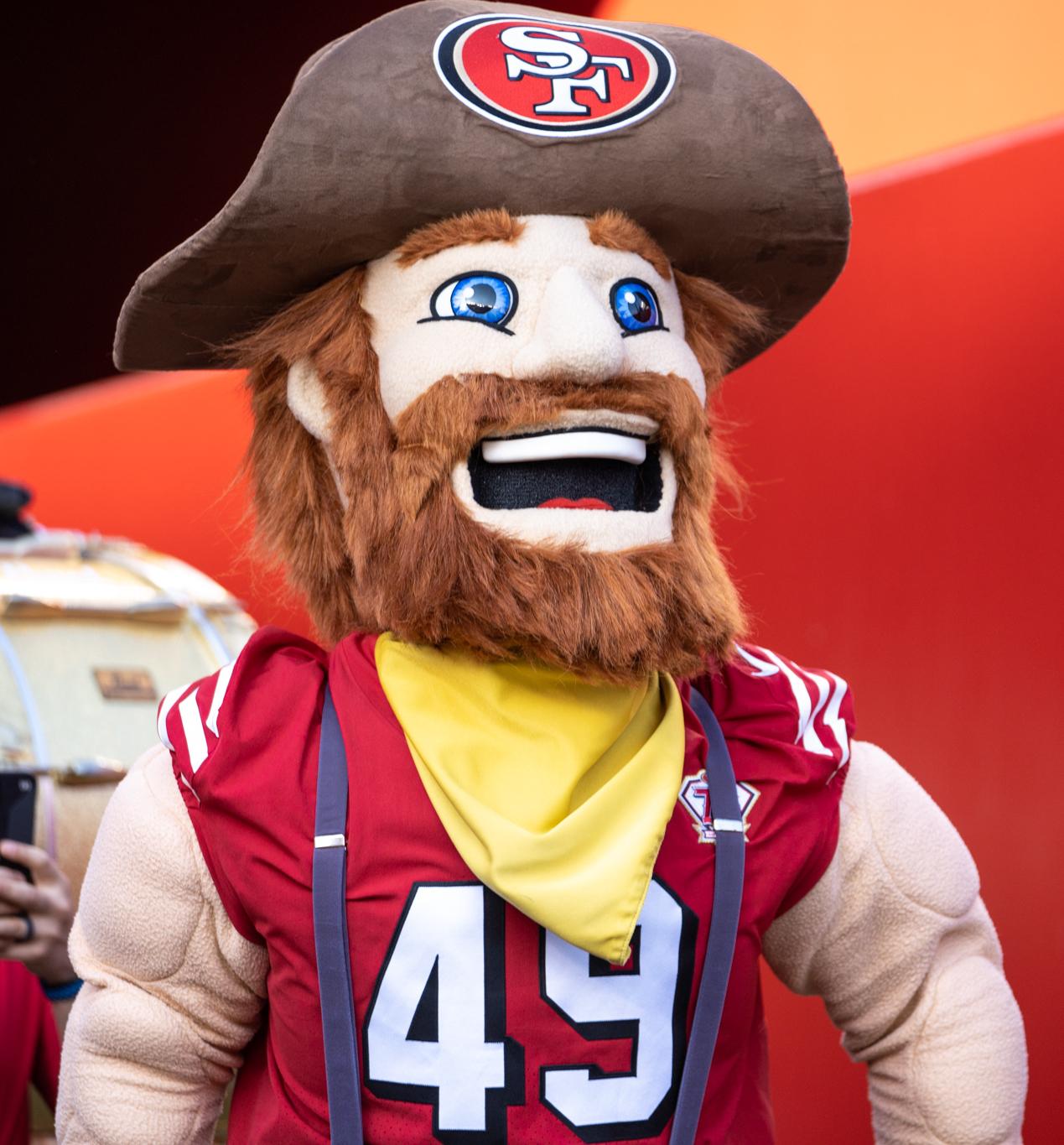
Sourdough Sam in September 2021

Sourdough Sam is a mascot for the American football team the San Francisco 49ers.

== History ==
Before the introduction of Sourdough Sam, the 49ers' first mascot was a mule called Clementine, named for the famous folk song Oh My Darling, Clementine, that wore a Maroon saddle blanket and appeared during the 1950s and 1960s.

A gold rush prospector–themed character first appeared in the 1970s. The character's design reflected the cover art of programs created by William Kay between 1946 and 1949—when the 49ers were a part of the All-America Football Conference—which depicted a bushy-mustached prospector with two pistols.

Sourdough Sam's persona later underwent a slight change from prospector to miner. As a miner, he depicted a large man with an oversized football helmet and plaid shirt matching that worn in the original William Kay cover art. Several elements of this version of Sourdough Sam, such as a bushy beard and suspenders, remained part of his image in later iterations. In 1985, this version of Sourdough Sam appeared in a cookbook titled 49er Fixens.

Another design change switched his helmet for a wide-brimmed ten-gallon hat with a chunk taken out of its brim and gave him a longer brown beard and larger, brown eyes.

Just prior to the 2006 NFL season, Sam's appearance was altered somewhat: He appeared as a clean-shaven gold panner with blue eyes and a hat without any imperfections.

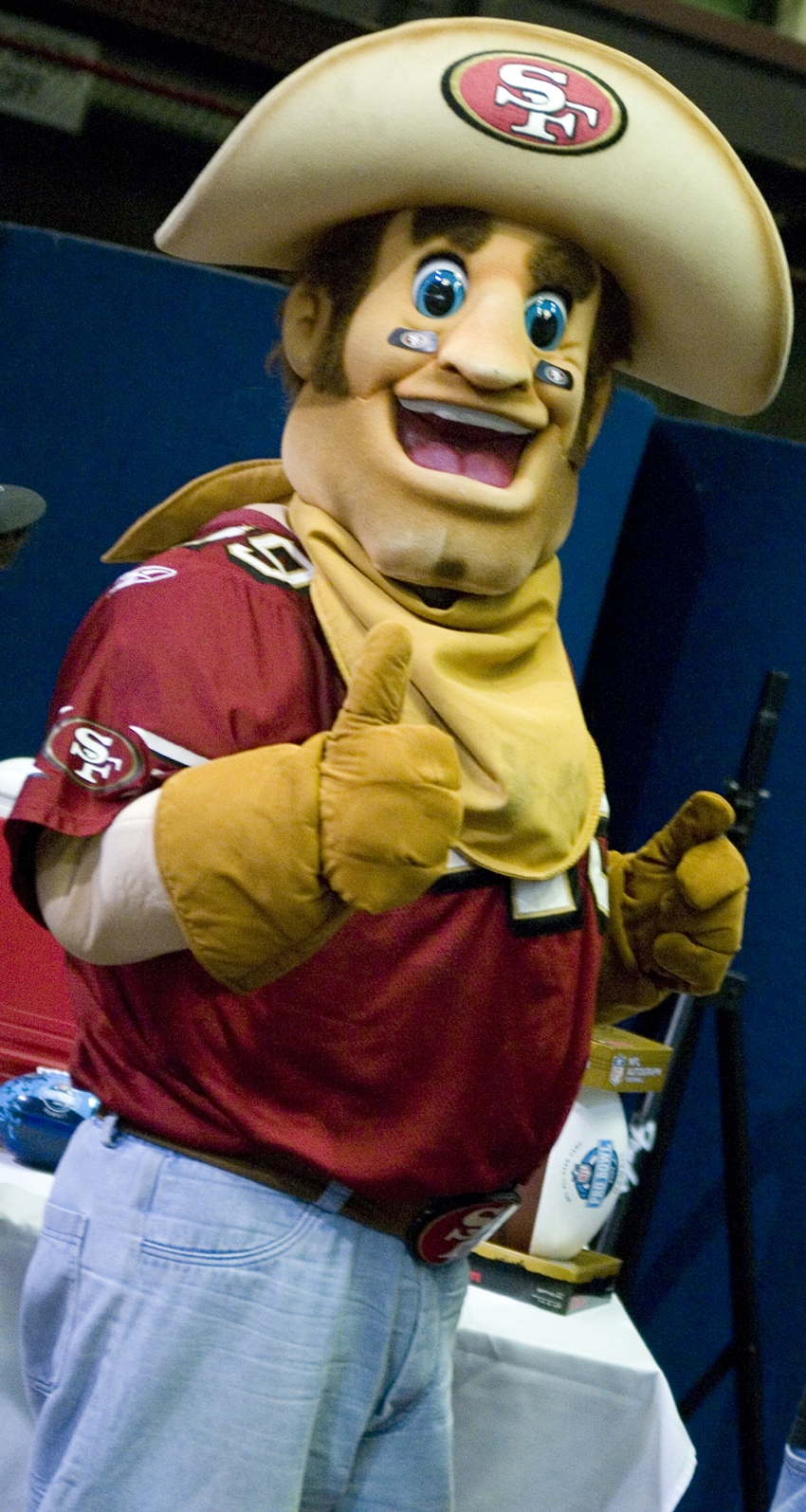
Sourdough Sam in February 2009

Sourdough Sam returned for the 2011 season with a beard and blue eyes.

== Outfit ==
Sourdough Sam typically wears a scarlet football jersey.And his jersey number is 49. He wears a white long-sleeved shirt underneath the jersey and sports light brown gloves as well as a gold handkerchief around his neck. He also wears a large, dark brown cowboy hat emblazoned with the logo for the 49ers and dark brown boots. His jeans are held up by suspenders, and in 2014 he was outfitted with a new pair of Levi's jeans after 60 years of wearing a non-branded pair, with promotional images of his entering Levi's Taylor Shop and watching his custom pair be produced. He sometimes carries a large pickaxe.

However, Sourdough Sam has made appearances with other outfits for special occasions. He has appeared with black boots and a black third jersey that was introduced in 2015, a camouflage shirt and jacket with camouflage headband for military related appearances, a red and white Santa suit-esqe top for holiday promotion, and a pink shirt with purple handkerchief for breast cancer awareness efforts. When meeting Snoop Dogg, Sourdough Sam wore shutter shades and a massive gold chain around his neck with the words "SOUR DIZZLE".

== Social media ==
He has a Facebook page with over 80,000 likes and a X page with username @SourdoughSam49, both of which release posts referring to him in the first person. These social media outlets are often used for promotional advertising content portrayed as being endorsed by Sam himself, such as the Faithful 49 Loyalty Program and the 49ers' Kids Club.

Sourdough Sam's birthday is April 9, likely coinciding with the month-date format of the day, 4/9. In 2015, a video of Sourdough Sam making his own birthday cake was released on this date.

== Outside appearances ==
He has appeared on Fox, Monday Night Football, ESPN's SportsCenter, Extra, MTV, Evening Magazine, and Nickelodeon.
