= Rampage (mascot) =

Mascot for the NFL's Los Angeles Rams

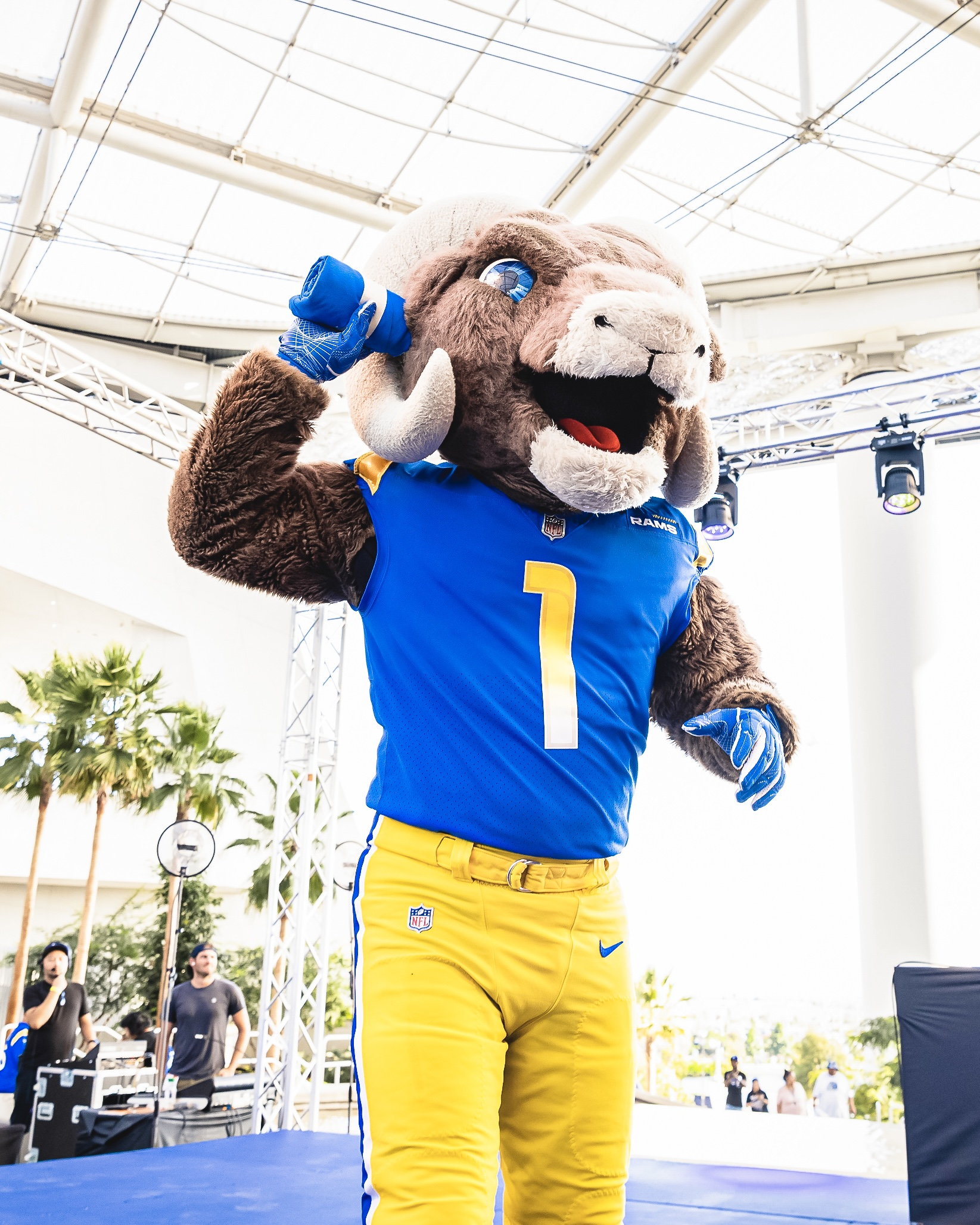
- Rampage at SoFi Stadium

No. 1 – Los Angeles Rams
- Position: Mascot

Rampage or Mr. Rammy is the official mascot of the Los Angeles Rams of the National Football League (NFL). Introduced in July 2010, he is an anthropomorphic ram who wears a Rams uniform. He wears the number one (#1).

== Background ==
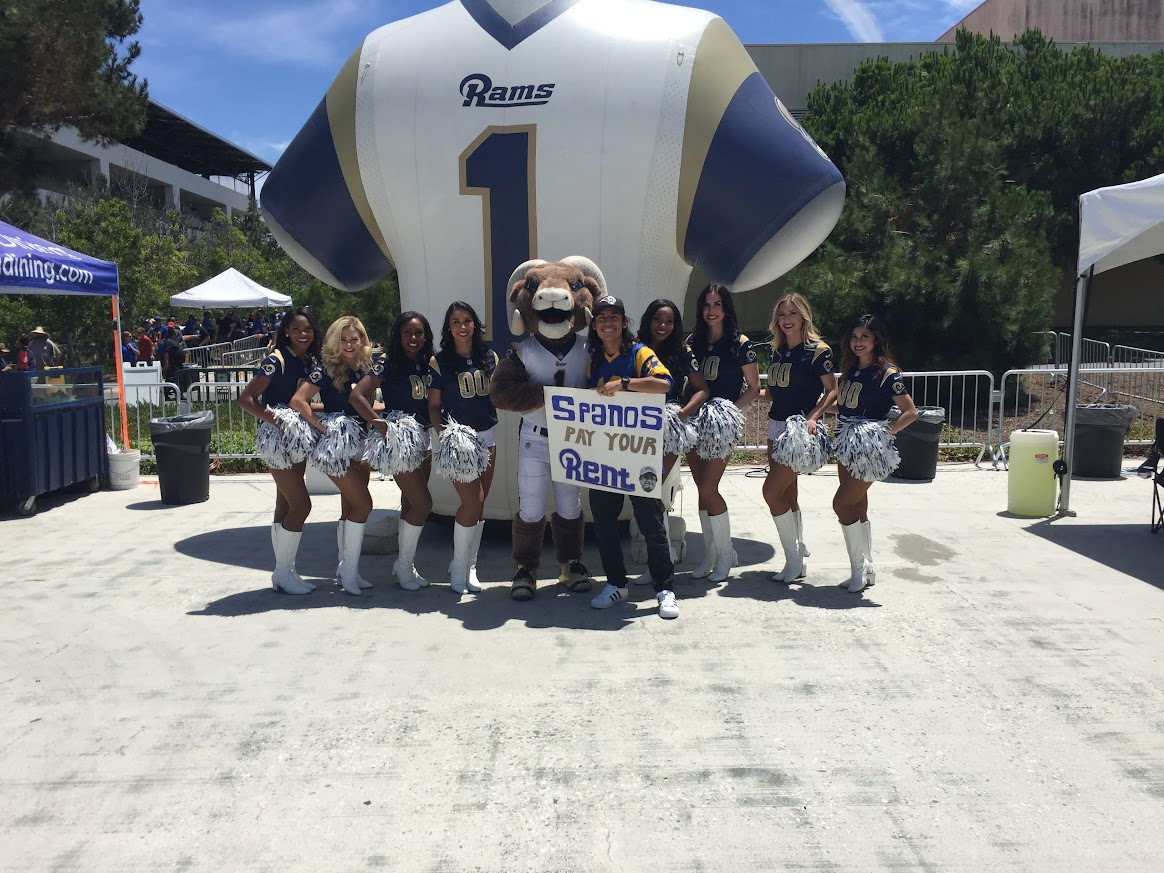
Rampage poses with a Rams fan during training camp in Irvine, California on August 3, 2019

Rampage stands 6'1" and tips the scales at 200 lbs. He can often be found roaming the sidelines of home games at the SoFi Stadium. Although a ram, he is known for his friendly demeanor and childlike antics. Home and opposing fans tend to find Rampage both friendly and approachable. When not at games, Rampage is typically found taking part in various initiatives across Los Angeles.

=== Naming Rampage ===
His name was selected by fans (while the team was still based in St. Louis) who voted in an online mascot-naming contest; "Rampage" was officially announced as the winning name at the St. Louis Zoo's south entrance on July 26, 2010. More than 1,000 names were submitted for the mascot. The top vote receivers were Rampage, Archie, Ramsey, Rammer, and Rush, respectively. The person who submitted the winning name won a suite at a Rams game for themselves and fifteen friends, a Ram's jersey, and a two hundred dollar gift card to the Official Rams online store. The winning name was submitted by Chris Shaffer. The Shaffer family was present for the unveiling of Rampage at the St. Louis Zoo.

=== Rationale ===
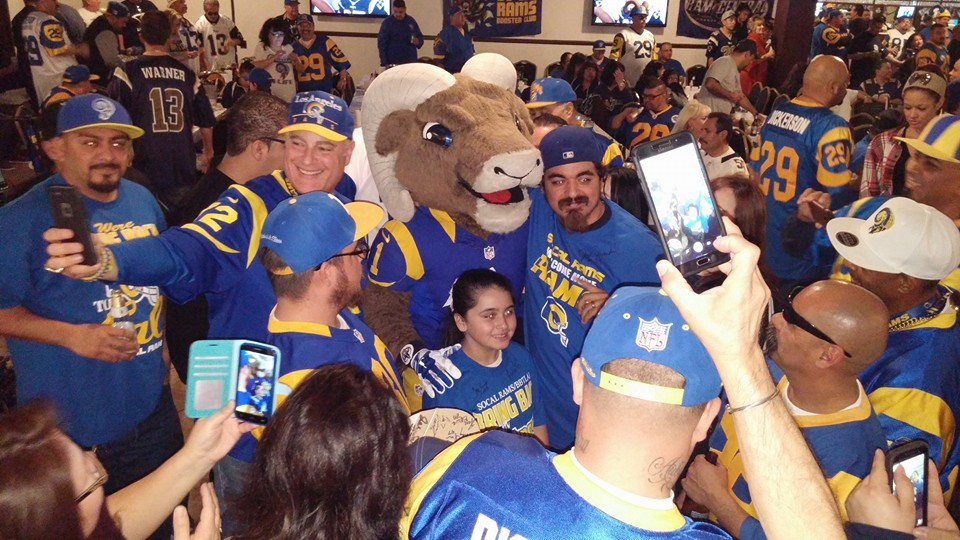
Rampage posing with fans of the Rams shortly after the team announced its relocation back to Los Angeles in 2016.

According to Kevin Demoff, the Rams' current executive-vice president of football operations, Rampage "has the coating of a stuffed animal, but the build of a superhero." Ram's ownership says that Rampage will make around 300 appearances a year from games to charity events and parties. Demoff says, "The organization decided to add a mascot to build game day entertainment and to make more involvement possible in the community." The team's plan is to have Rampage be part of the rebirth process of the team and to help bring the team a more distinguishable identity.

== Previous Mascots ==
Since the Rams started out as an organization in 1937, they have called three cities home. Their club has been based in Cleveland, Los Angeles, and St. Louis before returning to Los Angeles in 2016. In their 73 years of existence and their three home cities, they have only ever had one mascot before 2010. The mascot was a furry creature that resembled a rat more than anything and was named Ramster in the mid-1990s. The fans, however, did not take to Ramster and he was terminated in 1996.

== Accolades ==
- 1x Super Bowl champion (Super Bowl LVI)
- 7x NFL Pro Bowl Mascot
- 2x NFC Champion

On July 22, 2010, Rampage threw the ceremonial first pitch at the St. Louis Cardinals' baseball game at Busch Stadium.

== Performers ==
- Clint McComb (2010 - 2017)
- Alex Floch (2018 - PRESENT)
