= Lew Luce =

American football player (1938–2020)

No. 81
- Position: Running back

Personal information
- Born: April 3, 1938; Washington, D.C., U.S.
- Died: March 22, 2020 (aged 81); Washington, D.C., U.S.

Career information
- College: Penn State

Career history
- 1961: Washington Redskins
- Stats at Pro Football Reference

Llewellyn Attsett Luce Jr. (April 3, 1938 – March 22, 2020) was an American football running back in the National Football League for the Washington Redskins. He played college football at Penn State University.

== Biography ==
Born in Washington, D.C., Luce arrived at Woodrow Wilson High School in the fall of 1953 and as a tenth grade sophomore led Wilson to its third and last Interhigh basketball championship. He broke the Interhigh season scoring record of Wilson's Lonnie Herzbrun on the last day of the regular season only to have it broken that same night by Anacostia High School's Zeke Zirkle. Luce was a three-time All Met in basketball. Following his successful athletic career at Wilson, Lew was a 3 sport star and was named to the Bullis Prep Athletic Hall of Fame for his play in the 56–57 season. He earned a scholarship and enrolled at Penn State in the Fall of 57 and helped lead the PSU frosh to a 23–13 win over the Joe Bellino led Navy Plebes. Luce later became a football coaching assistant at Florida State. Luce returned to his Wilson alma mater in 1966 as head football coach of their first winning season in 7 years.

Luce died on March 22, 2020, at the age of 81.
