= Thunder (mascot) =

Stage name for the Denver Broncos football team live animal mascot

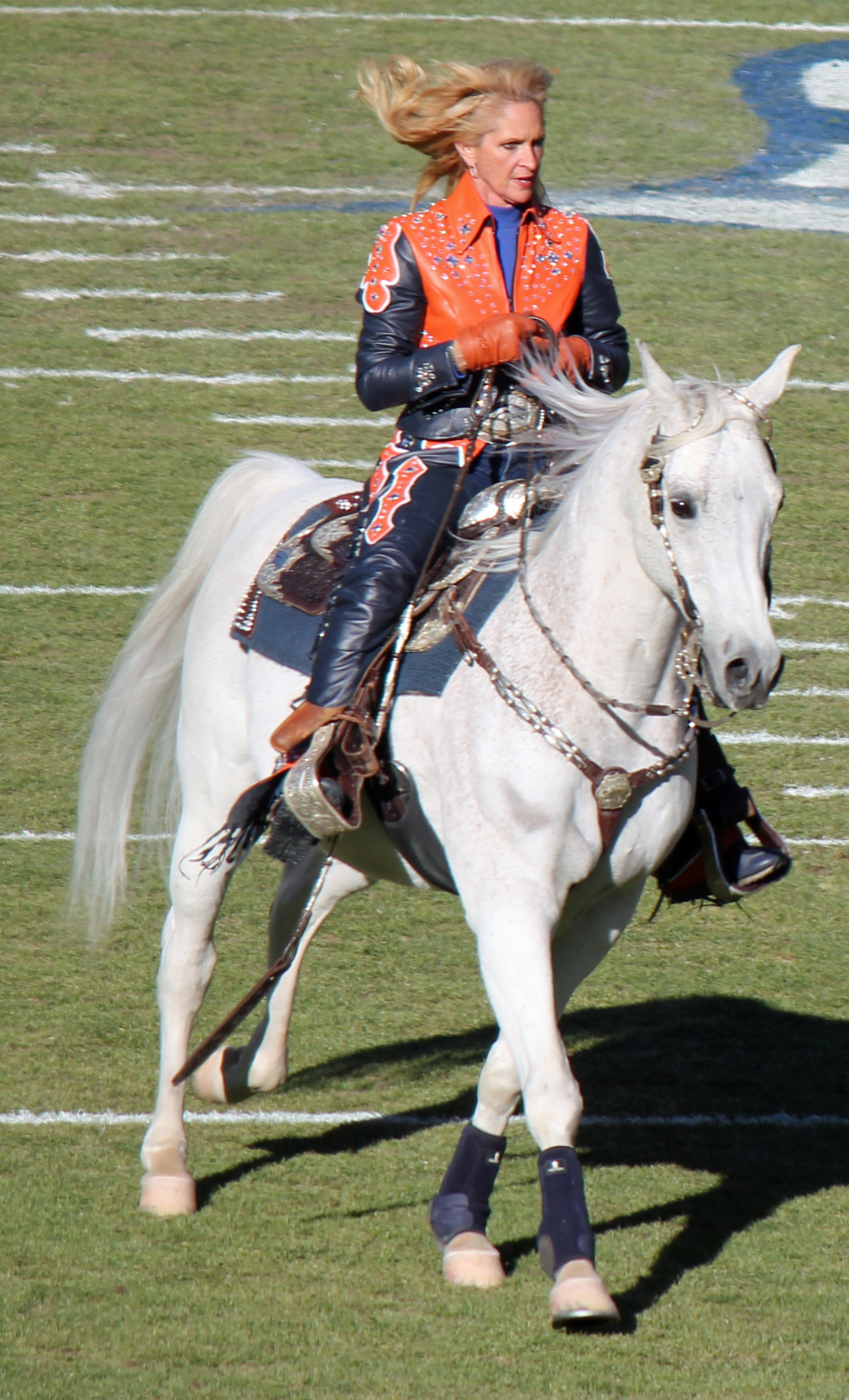
- Thunder II and Ann Judge
- Breed: Arabian horse
- Discipline: Sports mascot
- Sex: Thunder Sr.: stallion; Thunder II: gelding; Thunder III, gelding; Thunder IV, gelding
- Foaled: Thunder Sr.: 1983; Thunder II: 1994; Thunder III: 2000; Thunder IV: 2007
- Died: Thunder Sr.: 2009
- Country: United States
- Color: Gray
- Breeder: Sharon Magness-Blake
- Owner: Sharon Magness-Blake
- Trainer: Ann Judge

Thunder is the stage name for the horse who is the official live animal mascot for the Denver Broncos football team. Thunder shares mascot duties with Miles, a human who wears a horse head mask atop a Broncos uniform.

Three purebred Arabians have held this role since 1993, all gray horses whose coats lightened with age until they turned completely white. Sharon Magness-Blake has owned all of them, and Ann Judge has been their rider since 1998 and trainer since 1999. As of 2022, Thunder has appeared in four Super Bowls. The original Thunder performed in Super Bowl XXXII and Super Bowl XXXIII; Thunder III appeared in Super Bowl XLVIII and Super Bowl 50. Thunder III also made appearances in Times Square and on television morning news shows in New York City as part of the pre-game promotion for Super Bowl XLVIII.

Thunder's duties as mascot typically include leading the team onto the field at the start of every home game, and galloping down the length of the field whenever the team scores a touchdown or field goal. Thunder and his rider also interact with fans before the game; the horse is particularly popular with children, who are allowed to pet him. The horses who have served as Thunder need to remain calm in situations that would normally frighten most horses, such as being in football stadiums with thousands of cheering fans, exploding pyrotechnics, cheerleaders waving pom-poms, and other spectacles common to National Football League (NFL) games. He routinely appears in parades, makes hospital and school visits, and attends various other public functions. He has been flown on airplanes, ridden in elevators, and appeared indoors at press conferences and banquets.

The original Thunder, later named "Thunder Sr.", was described as bold and courageous. He was a stallion registered as JB Kobask, a former show horse, who was team mascot for the Broncos from 1993 until his retirement in 2004. He continued making community appearances until his death in 2009. Thunder Sr. was succeeded in 2004 by "Thunder II", an Arabian gelding registered as Winter Solstyce. He had been the personal pleasure riding horse of Magness-Blake. Judge described him as being somewhat timid when he first began his role as mascot but eventually grew into it. He retired from mascot duties in early 2014 but appeared in the 2016 Super Bowl 50 victory parade in downtown Denver following the Broncos win over the Carolina Panthers. "Thunder III", a gelding registered as Me N Myshadow, was the understudy to Thunder II, and trained specifically for mascot duties beginning at age three when he was started under saddle. He began performing at preseason games in 2013. Although Thunder II was still active as team mascot during the 2013–14 season, Thunder III was sent to Super Bowl XLVIII because he was younger and better able to handle air travel. He is described as laid-back, preferring to doze off during games when not performing. Thunder III ran one last time during the 2020 season. Thunder IV, registered as Phantom JD, began making appearances in the 2021 season and continued until the retirement of Magness-Blake and Judge following the 2025-26 season. The current Thunder, Thunder V made his debut at the Broncos’ September 2026 home opener. His team consists of Program Lead and Veterinarian Dr. Kelly Tisher, Program Lead Elizabeth Tisher, Trainer and Rider Gretchen Flynn, and Trainer Phillip Flynn.

.

== History ==
Video clip of Thunder III (Me N Myshadow) making a run in 2014 after Peyton Manning's record-breaking 509th touchdown pass

The original "Thunder", JB Kobask, was loaned to the Denver Broncos by Sharon Magness-Blake of Magness Arabians after she received a phone call from team officials asking if she had a "white" horse. (Note: Gray horses have a hair coat that depigments with age until it is almost pure white, or in some cases, "flea-bitten"; white with small darker spots.) Thunder's debut as team mascot was on September 12, 1993, during the Broncos' victory over the San Diego Chargers. Angela Moore, his rider at the time, galloped him down the field after each Broncos touchdown. Thunder's mascot duties were expanded to include delivering the game ball to the referees at the start of each home game. Spectators were allowed to interact with Thunder and pet him prior to the game. Magness said, "Thunder is friendly, and Broncos fans think it's good luck for the opposing team to pet our mascot". He was particularly popular with children, appeared on T-shirts, and was referred to as the "second most popular Bronco" after former quarterback John Elway. Thunder appeared at Elway's 1999 retirement gala. When team uniforms were redesigned in 1997, Thunder was the inspiration to incorporate a horse-head profile as part of the logo on the team's helmets. During a February 4, 1997 press conference introducing the new logo, the team president and the art director for Nike, creators of the new design, described it as "a powerful horse with a fiery eye and mane."

The original Thunder, also known as Thunder Sr., was retired in 2004 after serving 11 years as the team mascot. Magness-Blake replaced him with Thunder II, a 1994 Arabian gelding registered as Winter Solstyce. He was Magness-Blake's personal pleasure riding horse prior to taking on his new role as team mascot. As Thunder II grew older, Magness-Blake anticipated the need for a replacement and added a third gray horse to the team. He became known as Thunder III, a 2000 Arabian gelding registered as Me N Myshadow. Thunder III initially served as the understudy for Thunder II, and was trained specifically for the role of team mascot from his start under saddle.

== Mascot duties ==
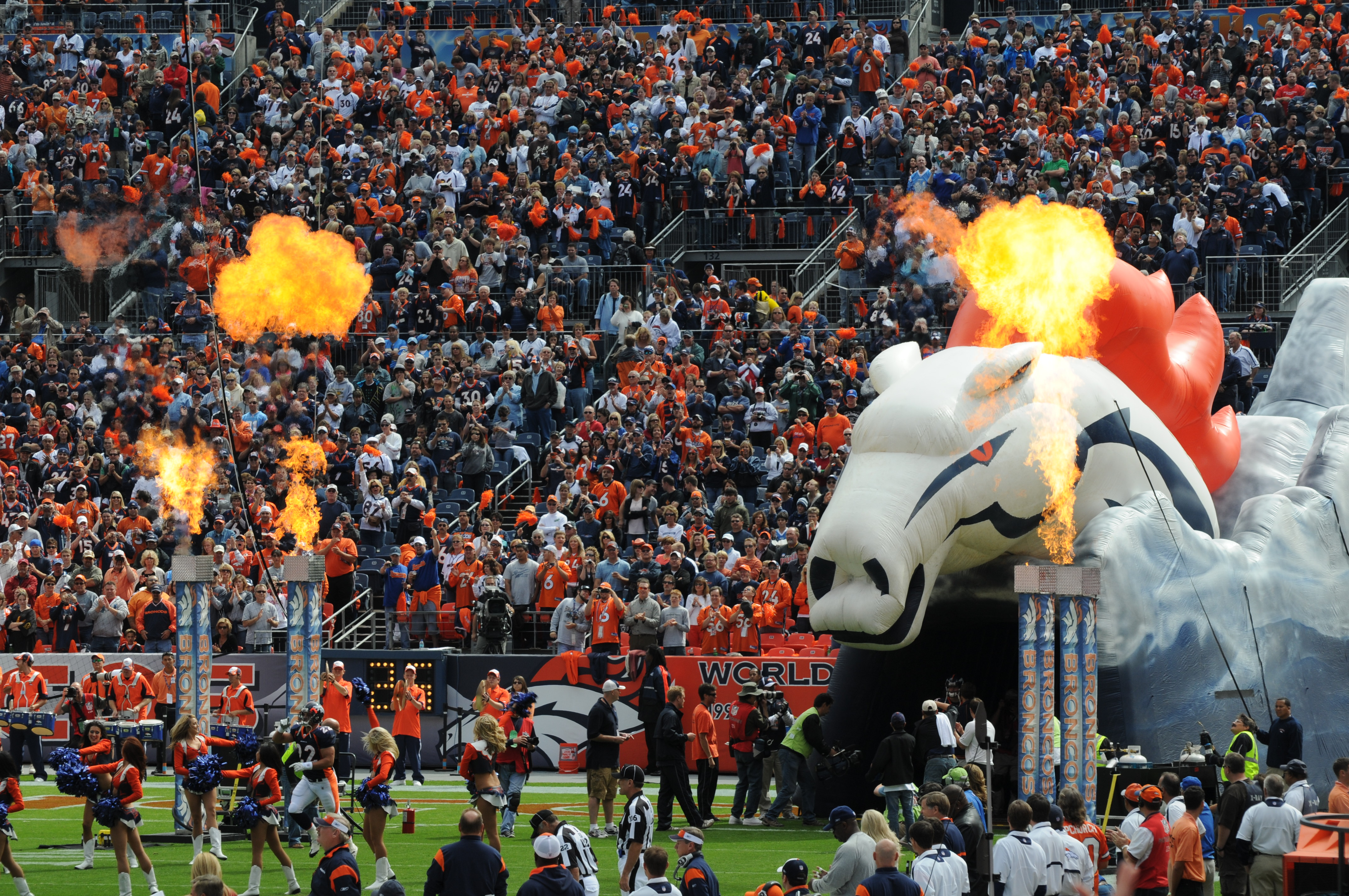
The tunnel from which Thunder emerges when he leads the Broncos onto the field is shaped like the Broncos' horsehead logo, and outside are cheerleaders, pyrotechnics and crowd noise.

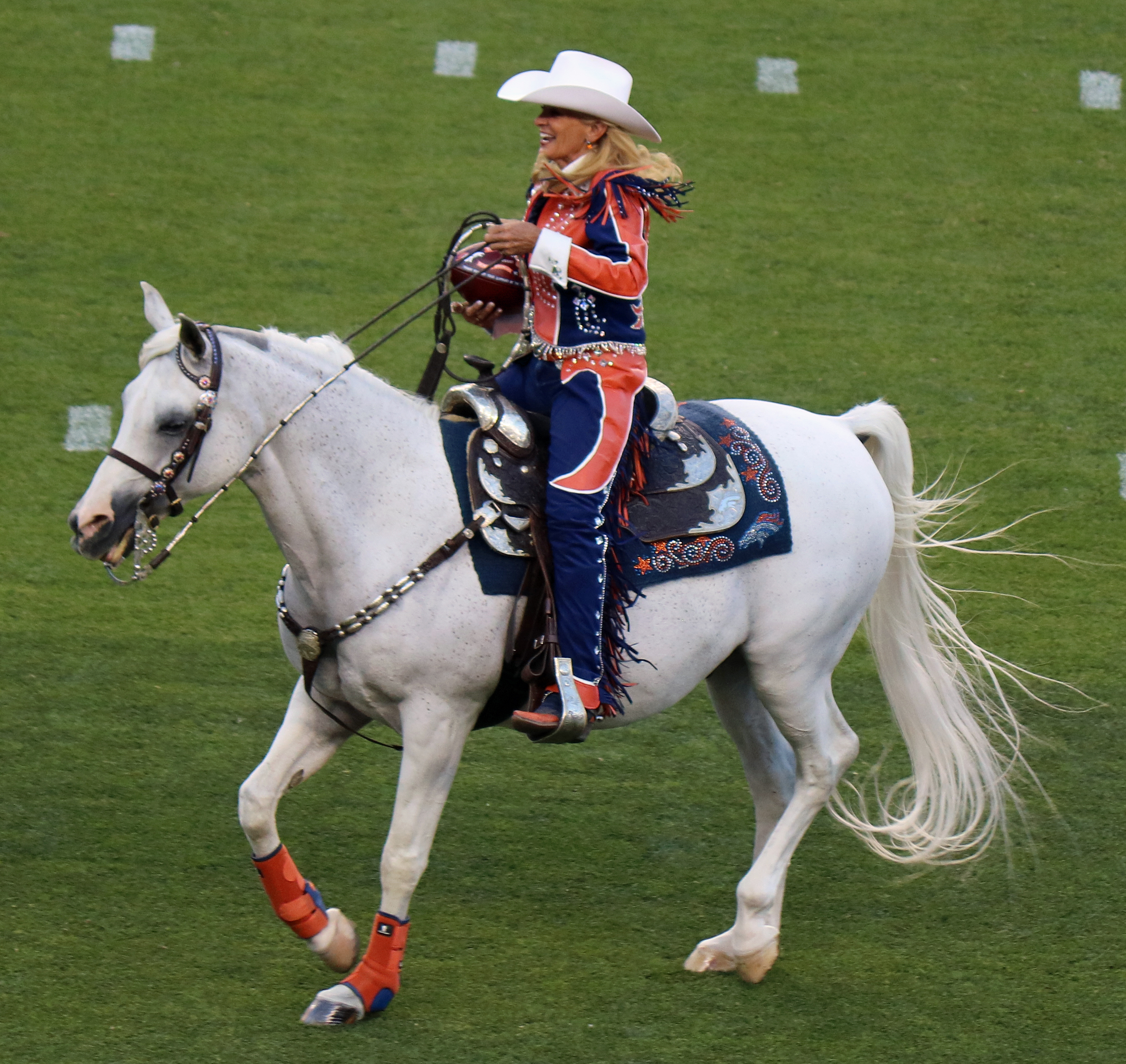
Thunder III and Ann Judge delivering the game ball

Thunder leads the team onto the field at the beginning of each home game, and typically gallops from one end of the field to the other whenever the team makes a touchdown. He may also make a run after a field goal, but not a safety. Each time he makes a run, a four-person crew runs down the sidelines to the end zone to escort Thunder back to his sideline position. Extra handlers ensure the safety of the horse and surrounding people. Thunder's helpers also remove any manure that he might drop while on the field. As well as his support crew, Thunder has a bodyguard who travels to the games. Thunder shares mascot duties with Miles, a human who wears a horse head mask atop a Broncos uniform.

The horses who have served as Thunder have been trained to remain calm in situations that would normally cause a horse to respond with a fight-or-flight response, such as the flashing explosions of a pyrotechnic display, or items suddenly landing on the field including skydivers with parachutes and various objects thrown by spectators, or loud music and the sounds associated with tens of thousands of cheering fans at Mile High. Ann Judge has explained that because so many unexpected things can happen, it is important that the people working with him remain calm; it is trust in his rider and handlers, not just desensitization, that helps the horse remain steady: "You want them to look to you for the appropriate response and for confidence and faith so that the flight response doesn’t get initiated." She describes the process by saying, "if something is fearful to him, as long as he looks to me, and I tell him he’s OK, he’s OK." The only frightening stimuli that was an ongoing problem for both Thunder Sr. and Thunder II was when the crowd would perform the wave; Thunder Sr. would stand still, but tremble. Thunder II would become tense, requiring ground handlers and his rider to help steady him. Thunder III is the first of the mascots to tolerate wearing earplugs, which help protect his hearing from loud noises during games.

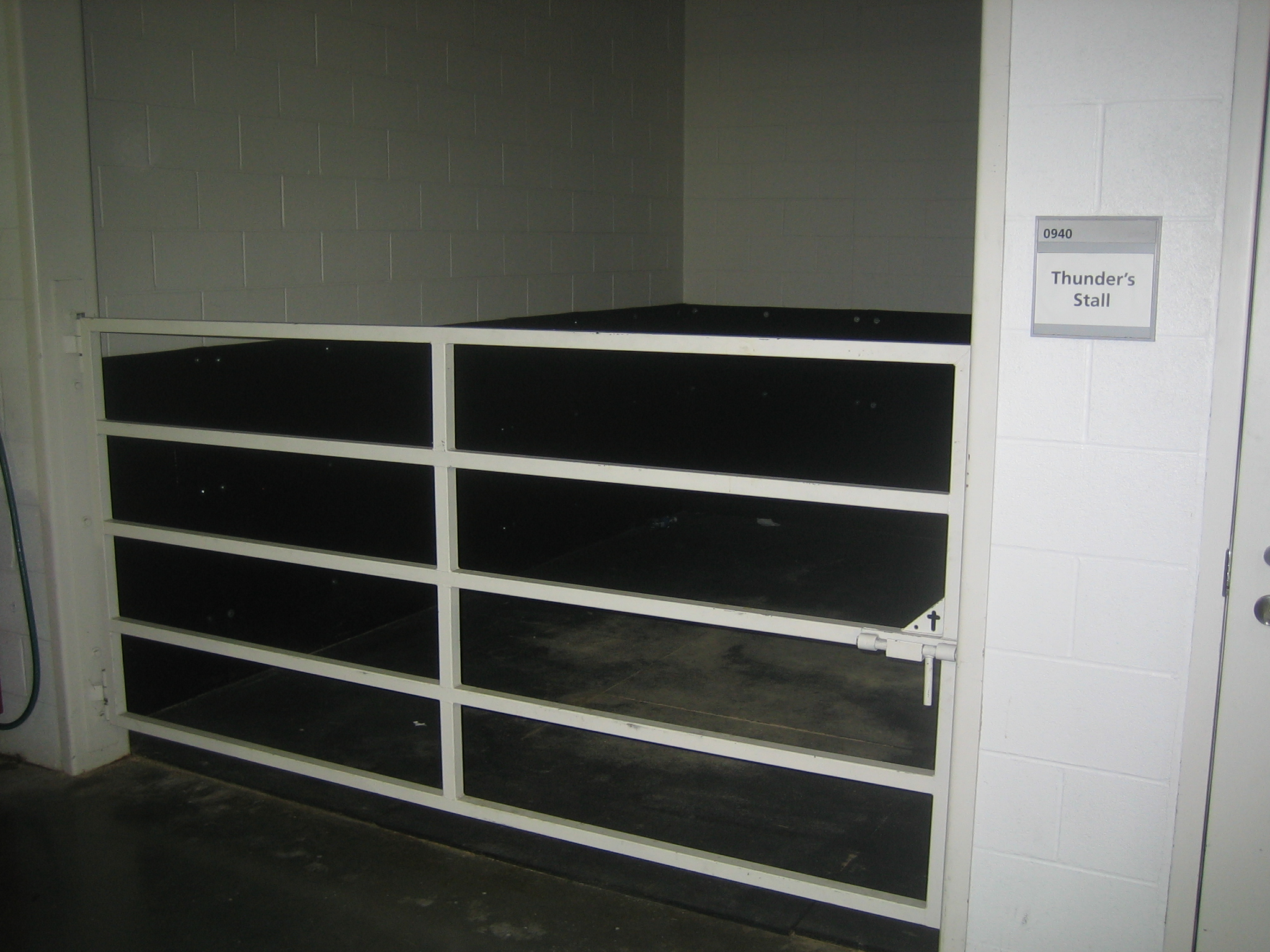
Thunder's stall on game days is near the visiting team's locker room at Sports Authority Field at Mile High.

Magness-Blake said one of the most dangerous parts of Thunder's job is at the beginning of the game when he leads the team onto the field, as there are cheerleaders ahead of him waving their pom-poms and a team of excited football players behind him. Ann Judge has also remarked about the team getting "amped up" with energy and excitement as Thunder leads them onto the field, explaining that "To him, amped up means danger." On one occasion, a person walked out unexpectedly in front of Thunder as he was leading the players onto the field. Thunder stopped immediately, averting a potentially dangerous situation. Another unexpected event occurred in 2014 during Super Bowl XLVIII when the pyrotechnics display was supposed to have been executed before Thunder led the team out but it went off unexpectedly during his run. Thunder responded to the situation with aplomb, continuing to run forward onto the field, though he performed flying lead changes with each explosion.

Thunder's record number of runs may have been during a 52–20 win on September 29, 2013, when he crossed the field eight times. Broncos quarterback Peyton Manning joked, "Might have to give ol' Thunder an I.V. after this one." Judge said Thunder, age 19 at the time, was not tired at all, describing him as "full of spit and vinegar" the next day.

Thunder appears primarily at home games, but has been transported out-of-state when the Broncos played in the Super Bowl. While at home, Thunder arrives at Mile High approximately two-and-a-half hours before kickoff. He is trailered into the stadium via the visitor's tunnel. He has a large private box stall located next to the visitor's locker room, and has hay, water and treats, including a big basket of carrots and apples. Judge signs autographs for about 45 minutes before each game, allowing fans, particularly children, an opportunity to become better acquainted with Thunder. Thunder usually leaves the field before the game is over. He is loaded into a horse trailer and hauled out of the stadium at the two-minute warning.

Thunder has other duties off the field, and has appeared at many public exhibitions and charity functions in the Denver area, including visits to schools and hospitals. He has appeared frequently as part of the color guard at Denver's annual National Western Stock Show. Thunder has gone up elevators, walked through indoor tunnels, has been ridden among the banquet tables at Magness-Blake's Western Fantasy fundraiser, and has attended indoor and outdoor press conferences.

=== Super Bowl appearances ===
At Super Bowl XXXII in 1998 in San Diego, Thunder Sr. appeared on the field after touchdowns. It was his first away game, and required 26 hours of trailering to reach the destination. Upon returning home, he led the team's victory parade in front of 600,000 fans in Denver. Thunder also attended Super Bowl XXXIII in Miami in 1999.

In early 2014, Thunder was again granted permission by the NFL to appear at Super Bowl XLVIII. Thunder III, age 14 at the time, made the trip because of concerns over Thunder II's age (20 years) and the stress some horses experience during air travel. It was the first time a Thunder mascot had been flown. He was transported to the east coast in a FedEx cargo plane, designed and equipped by Dutta Corporation specifically for transporting horses. FedEx sponsored the plane trip for its promotional value; the cost for which normally runs about $20,000. The day after his arrival in Newark, New Jersey, Thunder was hauled into New York City for television appearances on Today, and Fox & Friends. He also walked through Times Square.

At Super Bowl XLVIII, Thunder led the team onto the field at the start of the game, making it the first Super Bowl where he was allowed to do so. Thunder was also allowed to run in the end zone after a touchdown, but because MetLife Stadium was considered a neutral zone for both teams, he was not allowed to run the length of the field.

For Super Bowl 50, Thunder III was trailered to San Francisco, a two-day trip that took four days because of ice and snow, further complicated by a 24-hour closure of I-80. Upon arrival, Thunder was stabled at the Stanford Equestrian Center. Thunder II, who was retired at the end of the 2013–2014 season after the Broncos won the AFC Championship game, had remained in Denver. On the following Tuesday, he led the team in the Denver victory parade while Thunder III was still on the road heading home.

== Background ==
=== People ===
"The fact that all of this is done with an Arabian horse is satisfying ... Arabians are smart, kind, brave, quiet, gentle, athletic and personable. I feel grateful to be the spokesperson for Thunder and, in doing so, for the Arabian breed. I'm blessed."

— Ann Judge

Magness-Blake owned all three of the Arabian horses that portrayed Thunder. She grew up poor in Philadelphia, and did not ride a horse until she was 20 years old. She married Bob Magness, founder of Tele-Communications Inc., who also loved horses, and together they began an Arabian breeding operation that at its peak had 900 horses. Following the death of her husband in November 1996, Magness-Blake downsized the horse operation and by 2014 owned about 15 horses. In 2004, she married Ernie Blake, an attorney and the mayor of Breckenridge, who also loves horses. The couple, along with two other people, are part of Thunder's ground crew at football games.

The first horse trainer for JB Kobask as Thunder was Tom Hudson, the trainer for Magness Arabians at the time. The mascot's first rider was Angela Moore, then a 19-year-old assistant trainer to Hudson and a graduate of Colorado State University. Ann Judge, also known as Ann Judge-Wegener, became Thunder's rider in 1998. A year later, Judge took over as trainer as well as rider. She has been the trainer and rider of Thunder II for his entire career with the Broncos, and also does so for Thunder III. Judge grew up on an Arabian horse farm near West Lafayette, Indiana, and graduated from Purdue University in 1980 with a degree in English Education. She has ridden horses since she was five years old, was a participant in 4-H as a youth, and after finishing college became a horse trainer, first working in South Carolina and then in Colorado. Judge has been described by Broncos' management as an "accomplished equestrian". She has competed at the national level in Arabian and Pinto horse show competition. She is also a horse show judge who has adjudicated national and international events. Both Thunder II and Thunder III are stabled at Judge's farm in Bennett, Colorado.

=== Horses ===
==== Thunder Sr. ====
The original Thunder (JB Kobask) in 2004

JB Kobask, a purebred Arabian stallion foaled in 1983, became the first live horse mascot for the Broncos in 1993 after a successful horse show career. He was a son of the reserve U.S. National Champion Arabian Stallion GG Jabask, and a grandson of the Polish-bred Arabian *Bask, (Note: An asterisk before the name of an Arabian horse indicates that the horse was imported to the United States.) a multiple U.S. National Champion after his importation to the United States. JB Kobask also had a substantial amount of Crabbet breeding in his pedigree.

The stallion was kicked by a mare in a 1997 breeding accident, resulting in a fracture that required two arthroscopic surgeries on his stifle, akin to knee surgery on a human, and was out of commission for six weeks; another two months was needed before he could gallop at full speed. Following his recovery, he resumed his mascot duties and appeared at Super Bowl XXXII in January 1998. He served as the Broncos mascot for 11 years and was retired in 2004 after developing arthritis, which made it difficult for him to gallop down the field. He continued to make community appearances until his death in 2009 at age 27.

Thunder Sr. was noted for his bold and courageous personality, and was described by Magness-Blake as having "a strong ego". He had been trained to rear on command. Yet he remained calm and controlled in very intense situations, and Judge believed he had a sixth sense for when to be energetic for a performance and when to calm down. The stallion was notably gentle around children who wanted to pet him. During games, when he was waiting to perform, he had a tendency to watch players on the field.

==== Thunder II ====
Winter Solstyce, an Arabian gelding foaled in 1994, became "Thunder II" in 2004. He was Magness-Blake's personal riding horse for several years prior to becoming the Broncos' mascot. His paternal grandsire is *Salon, a Russian-bred Arabian stallion from the Tersk Stud exported first to Germany and later brought to the United States. Winter Solstyce's maternal grandsire is *Gondolier, who was a Polish National Champion and World Champion Arabian stallion at the Salon du Cheval in Paris, imported to the U.S. in 1981. The remainder of his lineage traces back to the Arabian horse breeding programs of Poland and Russia. He is linebred to the stallion Negatiw, who appears four times in his pedigree.

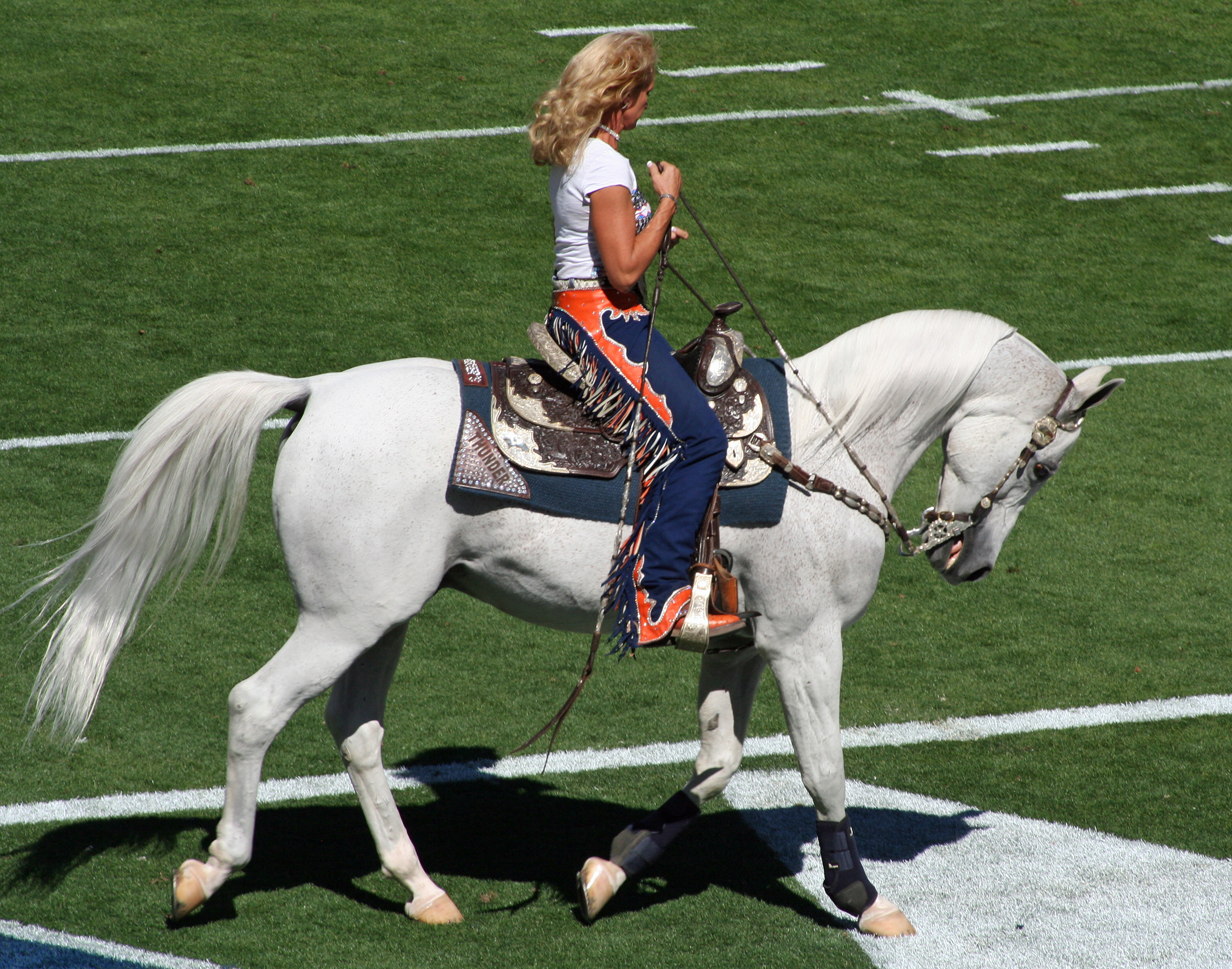
Thunder II (Winter Solstyce) warming up on the field prior to a 2010 game

Thunder II stands 14.3 hands (59 inches, 150 cm) tall and weighs over 900 pounds (410 kg). Nicknamed "Dos" by Judge, Thunder II has been described as somewhat timid with a more subdued personality than his predecessor. Initially, he was nervous of the white markings on the football field and would try to jump over them. He was also afraid of the cheerleaders' pom-poms. For desensitization training, Judge and the rest of Thunder's team would haul him to the football field at a local high school to work with people carrying pom-poms and to run across a marked field. His handlers used operant conditioning with positive reinforcement, associating pom-poms with a carrot treat. Eventually, he began turning to his handlers anticipating a treat whenever he saw a cheerleader with pom-poms.

Thunder II would look attentively with his ears forward, seemingly on cue, for his picture to be taken whenever a photographer pointed a camera at him. He is known for being people-friendly and particularly gentle with children who became acquainted with him prior to each game. Instead of watching players on the field the way Thunder Sr. did, Thunder II liked to observe the people in the stands. When bored, he has entertained himself by grabbing the zipper pulls of his handlers' jackets and running them up and down. He also learned how to unscrew water bottles and squeeze them to get water. Officially retired in 2014, Thunder II occasionally makes public appearances.

==== Thunder III ====
Thunder III is Me N Myshadow, a 2000 Arabian gelding, and third purebred Arabian to serve as team mascot. Ann Judge calls him "Tres". Me N Myshadow is sired by Monarch AH out of a *Gondolier daughter, making him a distant cousin to Winter Solstyce. Monarch AH was a race horse who won 19 of his 23 races, including several graded stakes races for Arabians, earning US$213,646. He was a son of the Polish import *Wiking, an all-time leading sire of Arabian racehorses. When Magness-Blake downsized her horse breeding program, Monarch AH was sold to Zayed bin Sultan Al Nahyan of the United Arab Emirates.

Thunder III began his mascot duties as the understudy to Thunder II. He appeared at a few preseason home games in 2013, and made most public appearances as team mascot in the Denver community that same year. His major public debut was in 2014 as team mascot at Super Bowl XLVIII in New Jersey. He also traveled to appear at Super Bowl 50.

Thunder III had been trained specifically for the role of Thunder, beginning at age three when Judge first started working with him under saddle. He was exposed to a variety of situations, including open horse shows where he could become accustomed to crowds and activity. Like Thunder II, he appeared at Magness-Blake's annual Western Fantasy fundraising banquet for the Volunteers of America. He is people friendly and has been described as "social" and "quite the poser". Unlike his predecessors, he tends to ignore the antics at football games, preferring to doze off when not performing. Like the other horses, though, he dislikes pom-poms and was unsettled when fans in the stadium did the wave.

In conjunction with Super Bowl 50, a Breyer Horse model was created of Thunder. In 2018, another horse, foaled in 2007, was announced as in training to become Thunder IV, but as of 2021 has not been publicly identified.

== See also ==
- Osceola and Renegade
- Peruna
- Traveler (mascot)
- Warpaint (mascot)
- List of historical horses
