= SS Viking (disambiguation) =

SS Viking may refer to:

== Ships ==
- SS Viking (1881), a sailing ship
- SS Viking (1905), a steamship
- Empire Viking, several Empire Ships named Viking, see List of Empire ships (U–Z)
  - SS Viking I, see List of Empire ships (U–Z)
  - SS Viking II, see List of Empire ships (U–Z)
  - SS Viking III, see List of Empire ships (U–Z)
  - SS Viking IV, see List of Empire ships (U–Z)
  - SS Viking VIII, see List of Empire ships (U–Z)
  - SS Viking IX, see List of Empire ships (U–Z)
  - SS Viking X, see List of Empire ships (U–Z)

== Other uses ==
- 5th SS Panzer Division Wiking, WWII Waffen-SS Nazi tank division "Viking", composed of Scandinavian volunteers

== See also ==
- Viking (disambiguation)
- Wiking (disambiguation)
