= Sharon Magness Blake =

American horse breeder

- Born: Sharon Costello; October 2, 1950 (age 75); Philadelphia, Pennsylvania
- Other names: Sharon Magness
- Known for: Philanthropy, Arabian horse breeder

Sharon Magness Blake (née Costello, born 1950) is a philanthropist and Arabian horse breeder who lives near Denver, Colorado. Born in Philadelphia, Pennsylvania, she was the oldest of James and Esther Costello's six children. She is the widow and second wife of Bob Magness (1924-1996), founder of Tele-Communications Inc. (TCI). Their first meeting involved business dealings and a common interest in Arabian horses. Bob Magness and his first wife of 36 years, Betsy, were active in the business of breeding and racing Arabian horses in the early 1980s when they first met Sharon Costello. She was working as a sales manager for an Arabian horse breeding operation. Betsy conducted most of the business transactions with Sharon over the course of about 4 years. Sharon later started selling equine insurance. In 1985, Bob and Betsy traveled to Europe to purchase horses. During that trip, Betsy suffered a fatal heart attack. It wasn't until 1986 at a horse auction in Phoenix, AZ that Bob Magness again crossed paths with Sharon Costello. They were married in 1989 in St. Thomas, Virgin Islands in a private ceremony.

Sharon and Bob continued the Arabian breeding and racing program, then Magness Racing Ventures, LLC., which grew to 900 horses when operating at its peak. Sharon handled all of the administration including registration and shipping. In 1993, Sharon received a phone call from officials with the Denver Broncos football team asking if she had a white horse. She agreed to lend the team her 1983 Arabian stallion, JB Kobask, who became known as Thunder, the team's first live mascot and one of three Arabian horses to portray the role. Thunder made his debut appearance on September 12, 1993 during a Broncos victory over the San Diego Chargers.

Following the death of Bob Magness in 1996, Sharon Magness contested the will which involved a prenuptial agreement she had signed prior to the marriage. There was also a "bandaid will" involved that Magness had initiated after an almost fatal incident with his heart. Sharon scaled down the breeding operation to around fifteen horses over time. In 2004, she married her second husband, Ernie Blake, an attorney and mayor of Breckenridge, CO. who shared her love of horses.
