= SS Wiking =

SS Wiking may refer to:

- 5th SS Panzer Division Wiking, WWII Waffen-SS Nazi tank division, composed of Scandinavian volunteers

== Ships ==
Several ships of the WWII Kriegsmarine

- SS Wiking 1
- Several ships of the WWII Kriegsmarine captured by the British Royal Navy and converted to Empire Ships, see List of Empire ships (U–Z)
  - SS Wiking 2, see List of Empire ships (U–Z)
  - SS Wiking 3, see List of Empire ships (U–Z)
  - SS Wiking 4, see List of Empire ships (U–Z)
  - SS Wiking 8, see List of Empire ships (U–Z)
  - SS Wiking 9, see List of Empire ships (U–Z)
  - SS Wiking 10, see List of Empire ships (U–Z)

== See also ==
- Wiking (disambiguation)
- Viking (disambiguation)
