= Pat Patriot =

Mascot for the NFL's New England Patriots

"Pat Patriot" logo used by the New England Patriots as their primary logo from 1960 (when the team was known as the Boston Patriots) through 1992. This logo is commonly referred to as "Pat The Patriot" and has been resurrected for the Patriots' white-helmeted throwback uniforms. Pat The Patriot can be seen on the Patriots' sideline, appearing on official team-issued clothing worn by players such as former quarterback Tom Brady's knit winter hat.

Pat Patriot, commonly referred to as "Pat The Patriot," is the mascot of the New England Patriots of the National Football League (NFL). He is depicted as a soldier of the American Revolution. The logo version of Pat wears a tricorne hat and a Continental Army uniform. This was the Patriots' official insignia until 1993, when it was replaced by the current logo which is known as "Flying Elvis". Today, Pat Patriot is used for throwback merchandise as well as an alternate logo across the Patriots branding. Logo Pat was created by Worcester Telegram - Evening Gazette cartoonist Phil Bissell in 1960.

== 1979 new logo consideration ==
In 1979 the Patriots considered replacing Pat Patriot with a new logo, mainly because Pat Patriot was very detailed and was therefore difficult to replicate accurately on various promotional materials and merchandise. Unsure if this would be a good decision for the team, executives decided to let the fans vote for the logo they preferred during halftime of a Patriots' home game. Pat Patriot was the overwhelming victor.

== Live mascot ==
=== Development ===
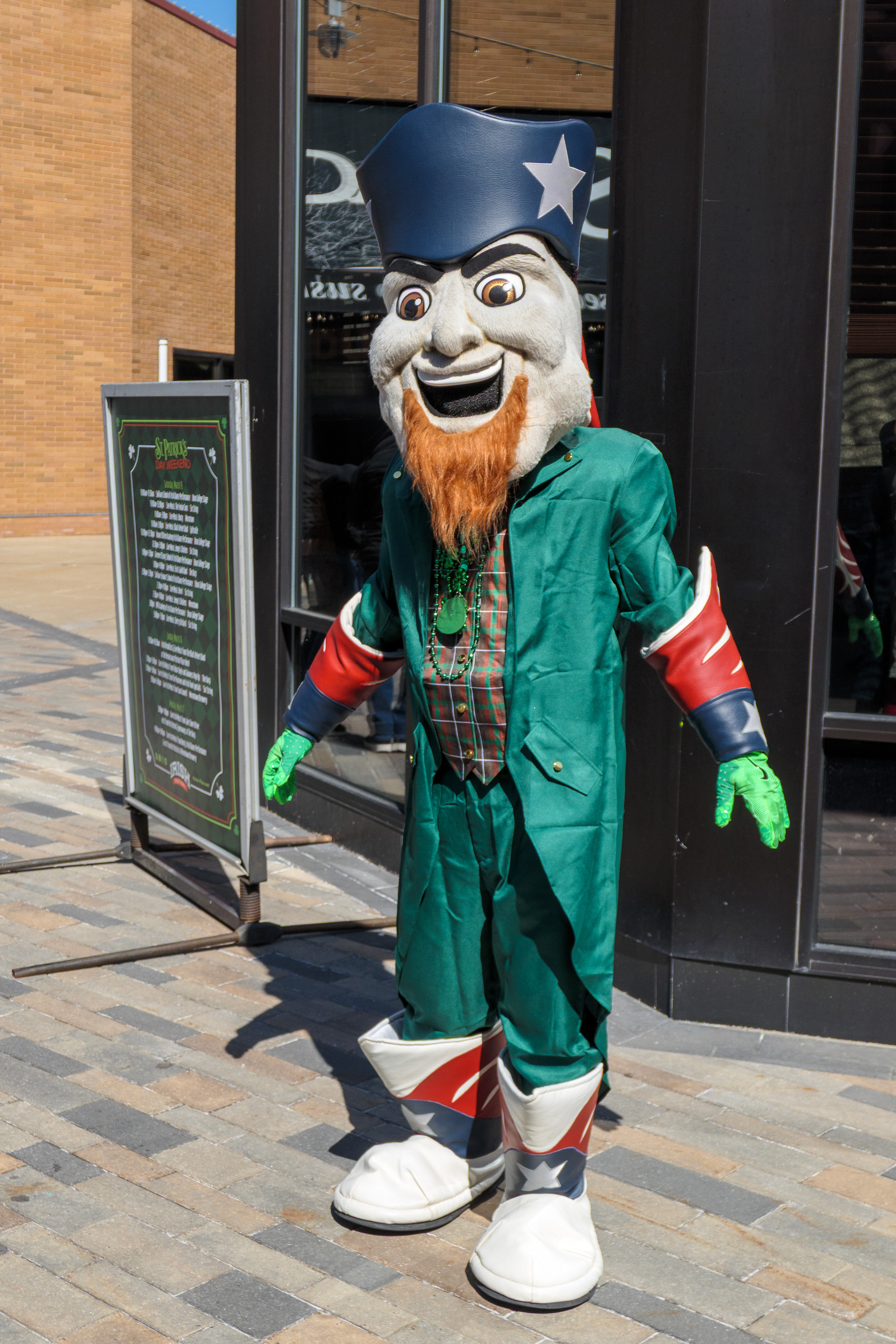
Pat wears green for Saint Patrick's Day

The live mascot Pat was originally developed in the early 1990s and made one of his first public appearances at the 1995 Pro Bowl as a Team NFL Hero. Team NFL Heroes were a line of mascot-like characters developed by NFL Properties; most of the characters only lasted a season or two but a handful ended up being adopted as official mascots by their respective teams, either immediately after the Team NFL Heroes project was canceled or years later with Pat being an example of the former. The live mascot Pat we know of today was intended at first to be a completely different character from the Pat Patriot logo; this is supported by the fact that Pat's name was listed as "Revere" (a reference to Paul Revere) on Team NFL Heroes merchandise.

=== Character design ===
Live mascot Pat wears either the Patriots' home uniform which consists of the navy blue jersey, number 1, with newly revealed navy blue pants or the away uniform which consists of the white jersey, number 1, with navy blue pants. Which uniform Pat wears depends on which uniform the team wears in the game he is appearing at. Pat previously wore jersey number 0 until a fan approached team owner Robert Kraft and asked if the number could be changed. This interaction was caught on tape by NFL Films and shown on television.

== Super Bowl appearances ==
Pat has represented the Patriots as the team's live mascot in eleven of the twelve Super Bowls the team has appeared in: XXXI, XXXVI, XXXVIII, XXXIX, XLII, XLVI, XLIX, LI, LII, LIII, and LX.
