= Wiking =

Wiking or Wikings, German for Viking, may refer to:

- Wiking (horse), an Arabian racehorse
- Blohm & Voss BV 222 Wiking, a World War II flying boat
- Wiking Modellbau, a German maker of scale models
- 5th SS Panzer Division Wiking, a Waffen SS panzer division
- Wiking Helikopter Service, a German helicopter operator
- Wiking-Jugend, a German neo-Nazi organisation
- Tempo Wiking, a van by Tempo

Wiking is also a surname:

- Mats Wiking (born 1961), Swedish politician

== See also ==
- SS Wiking (disambiguation), several ships
- Viking (disambiguation)
- Wicking (disambiguation)
