= NFL Properties =

US company

NFL Properties is the merchandising and licensing arm of the National Football League (NFL). The subsidiary of the league was founded in 1963 to maintain control of the brands of the league and its franchises and to license and negotiate with vendors to create official NFL merchandise. The NFL Properties head office is located in New York City.

== Team NFL Heroes "mascot" program ==
A line of mascot-like characters representing each team in the NFL was developed by NFL Properties in the early 1990s. Named "Team NFL Heroes", various types of merchandise such as stuffed dolls, school supplies, t-shirts, and lamps featuring the characters were manufactured and marketed mainly to children and teenagers. Mascot costumes of each character were created and people wearing these costumes made an appearance at the 1995 Pro Bowl. Most of the Team NFL Heroes characters only lasted a season or two. Some of the characters, such as New England Patriots mascot Pat Patriot and Denver Broncos mascot Miles, were officially adopted as mascots by their respective teams.

During the Team NFL Heroes campaign, the Green Bay Packers had a bear for a mascot despite their arch rivals being the Chicago Bears. Specifically a polar bear, the Packers' Team NFL Hero's name was "Bayer", a play on Green Bayer (meaning a citizen of Green Bay, Wisconsin) while simultaneously being a homonym of "bear".

== Comic books ==
The NFL branched out into comic books in the early 1990s when Marvel Comics created the series NFL SuperPro. The comic book and character was widely panned and only twelve issues of the comic book were printed. The NFL also promoted SuperPro at some events by using a mascot.

== Video games ==
Long before video games, the National Football League began licensing Electric Football in 1967. The game was produced by Tudor Games. There have been several American football video games based on NFL teams created for various consoles and computers over the years, from NFL Pro League Football by Micro Sports Inc. to 10-Yard Fight and the Tecmo Bowl series for the NES to the more well known Madden series that have been released annually since 1988. The Madden series is named after former coach and American football commentator John Madden. Prior to the 2005–2006 football season, other NFL games were produced by competing video game publishers, such as 2K Games and Midway Games. In December 2004, Electronic Arts signed a five-year exclusive agreement with the NFL, meaning only Electronic Arts would be permitted to publish games featuring NFL team and player names. This prompted video game developer Midway Games to release a game in 2005 called Blitz: The League, with fictitious teams and players. In February 2008, EA Sports renewed their exclusivity agreement with the league through Super Bowl XLVII in 2013. According to The Sporting News, as of October 2015 "it's not publicly known when, or if, the contract will end."

== Legal issues ==
NFL Properties was taken to court by former supplier American Needle, Inc over antitrust violations. The issue was NFL Properties granting exclusive license to one supplier over making a product.

Court decisions varied on whether the league and it franchises were acting as a single entity, or whether franchises were competing with each other off the field in merchandising sales. The case was eventually appealed all the way to the United States Supreme Court.
