= Miles (mascot) =

Mascot for the NFL's Denver Broncos

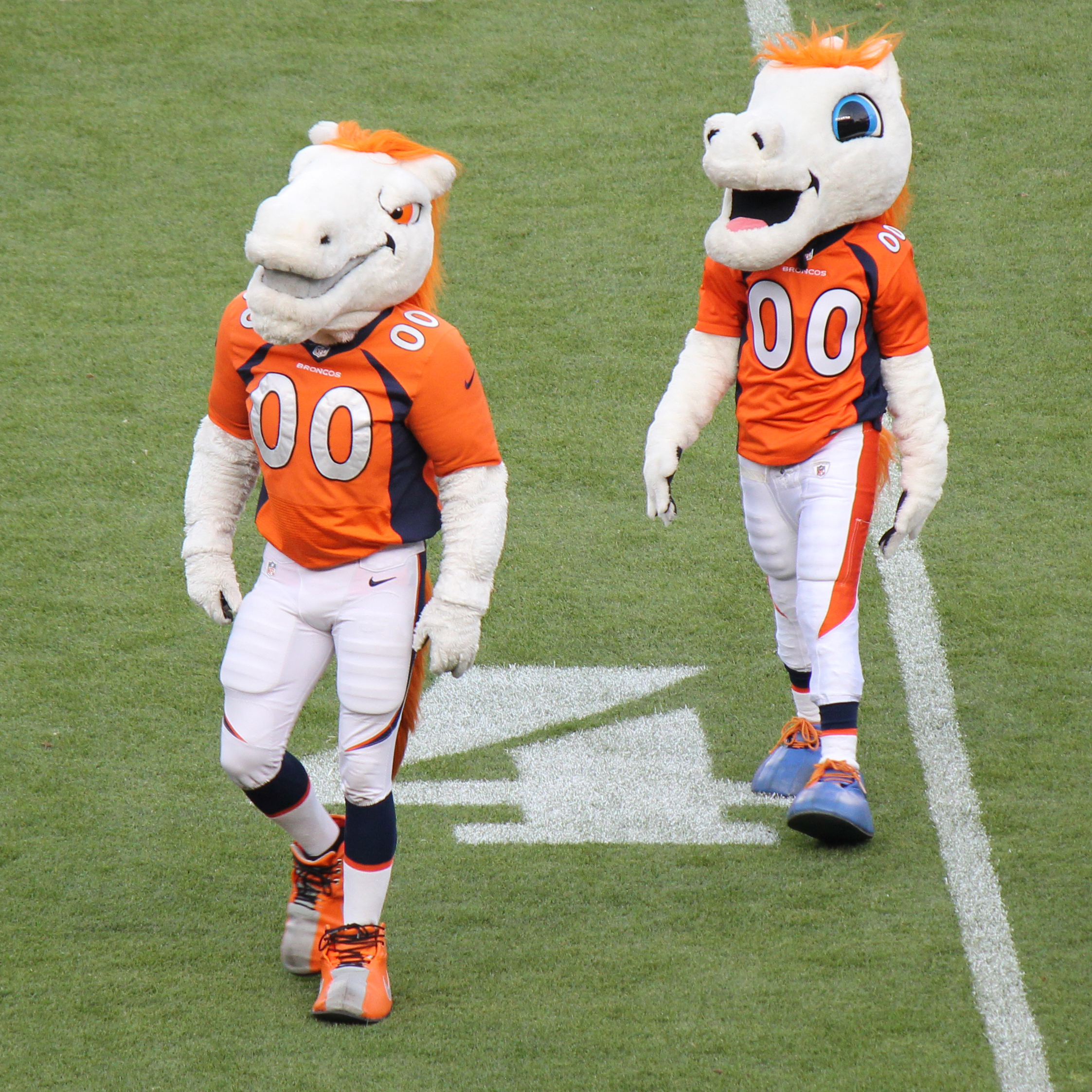
Miles (left) and a second mascot (right) that appeared in the beginning of the 2015 NFL preseason

Miles is one of two official mascots of the Denver Broncos, an American football team in the National Football League (NFL).

== History ==
Miles was preceded as the Broncos' mascot by Huddles, "a horse on his hind legs, with a big helmet.” Huddles was performed during the Broncos' 1986 Super Bowl season by a then-teenage Michael Hancock who later became the mayor of Denver.

Miles was developed in the early 1990s and made his first public appearance at the 1995 Pro Bowl as a Team NFL Hero. Team NFL Heroes were a line of mascot-like characters created by NFL Properties for every team in the league; most of the characters only lasted a season or two but a handful ended up being adopted as official mascots by their respective teams, either immediately after the Team NFL Heroes project was canceled or years later with Miles being an example of the latter. Before the Broncos unveiled him as their official team mascot some changes to his appearance were made, such as changing his fur from orange to white and switching his jersey number from 0 to 00.

According to Miles' official backstory, he was born on January 31, 1999, the same day that the Broncos became Super Bowl champions for the second time at Hard Rock Stadium, then known as Pro Player Stadium, near Miami, Florida. However, he did not appear in person as a mascot until two years later. Now Miles resides at Empower Field at Mile High in Denver, Colorado. He appears at Broncos' home games and community promotions such as the Broncos' reading program.

== See also ==
- Thunder (mascot)
