= Wicking =

Wicking may refer to:

- Capillary action, the ability of a liquid to flow in narrow spaces
- Christopher Wicking (1943–2008), British screenwriter and film critic

== See also ==
- Wick (disambiguation)
- Wicking bed, an agricultural irrigation system used in arid countries where water is scarce
- Wicking fabric, used for moisture management in layered clothing
- Wiking (disambiguation)
