= List of Empire ships (U–Z) =

== Suffix beginning with U ==
=== Empire Unicorn ===
Empire Unicorn was a 7,067 GRT cargo ship which was built by William Gray & Co Ltd, West Hartlepool. Launched on 29 October 1943 and completed in December 1943. Allocated in 1945 to the French Government and renamed Pierre Corniou. Sold in 1950 to Société Navale de l'Ouest and renamed Saint Andre. Sold in 1953 to O Wallenius, Stockholm and renamed Otello. Sold in 1956 to L Jeansson AB, Stockholm and renamed Apollo. Sold in 1961 to Polska Zegluga Morska, Poland and renamed Kopalnia. Relegated to a storage vessel at Gdynia in 1971 and renamed MP-ZP-GDY 7.

=== Empire Union ===
Empire Union was a 5,952 GRT cargo ship which was built by Stabilimento Tecnico Triestino, Trieste. Completed in 1924 as Salvore. Sold in 1937 to Lloyd Triestino and renamed Sistiana. Seized on 10 June 1940 as a war prize by the South African Navy in Table Bay. To the South African Government and renamed Myrica. To MoWT in 1941 and renamed Empire Union. Torpedoed on 26 December 1942 and sunk by U-356 at 47°30′N 24°30′W while a member of Convoy ON 154.

=== Empire Unitas IV ===
Empire Unitas IV was a 341 GRT whaler which was built by Bremer Vulkan Schiff- und Mashcinenbau, Bremen. Completed in 1937 as Unitas 4 for Jurgens Van Den Bergh Margarine Verkaufs Union GmbH, Hamburg. Requisitioned by the Kriegsmarine in 1940. Seized in May 1945 at Flensburg. To MoWT and renamed Empire Unitas IV. Scrapped in 1955 in Port Glasgow.

=== Empire Unitas V ===
Empire Unitas V was a 341 GRT whaler which was built by Bremer Vulkan Schiff- und Mashcinenbau, Bremen. Completed in 1937 as Unitas 5 for Jurgens Van Den Bergh Margarine Verkaufs Union GmbH, Hamburg. Requisitioned by the Kriegsmarine in 1940. Seized in May 1945 at Flensburg. To MoWT and renamed Empire Unitas IV. Scrapped in 1954 in Port Glasgow.

=== Empire Unitas VIII ===
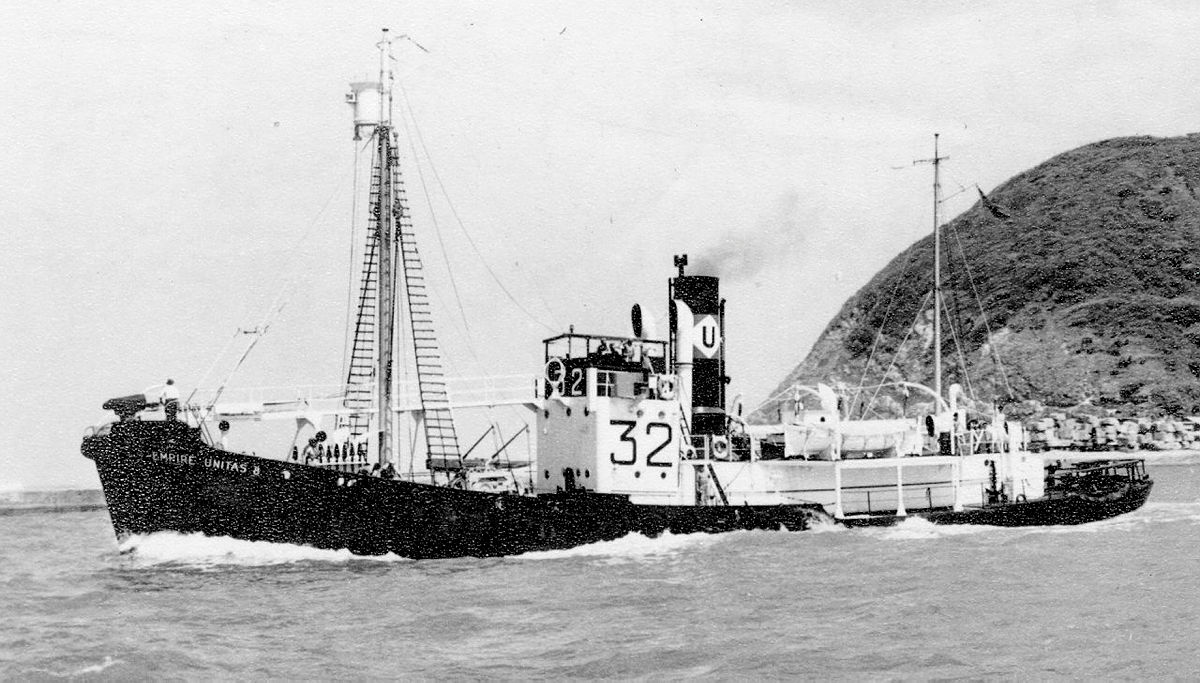
Empire Unitas VIII

Empire Unitas VIII was a 341 GRT whaler built by Bremer Vulkan Schiff- und Mashcinenbau, Bremen. Completed in 1937 as Unitas 8 for Jurgens Van Den Bergh Margarine Verkaufs Union GmbH, Hamburg. Requisitioned by the Kriegsmarine in 1940. Seized in May 1945 at Kiel. To MoWT and renamed Empire Unitas VIII. Sold in 1956 to Union Whaling Co Ltd, South Africa and renamed Sir Liege. Scrapped in October 1961 in Durban.

=== Empire Unitas X ===
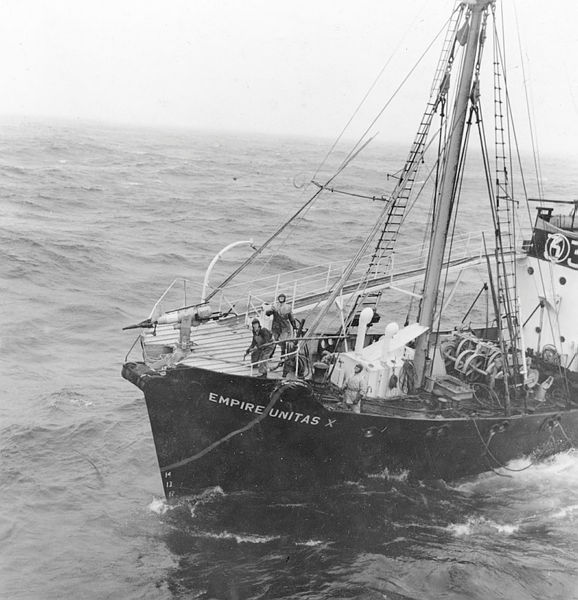
Empire Unitas X

Empire Unitas X was a 339 GRT whaler built by F Schichau GmbH, Danzig. Completed in 1939 as Unitas 10 for Jurgens Van Den Bergh Margarine Verkaufs Union GmbH, Hamburg. Requisitioned by the Kriegsmarine in 1940. Seized in May 1945 at Emden. To MoWT and renamed Empire Unitas X. Sold in 1956 to Union Whaling Co Ltd and renamed C P Robinson. Scrapped in January 1963 in Durban.

=== Empire Unity ===
Empire Unity was a 6,386 GRT cargo ship which was built by AG Weser, Bremen. Completed in 1927 as Biscaya for J T Essberger, Hamburg. Captured on 19 October 1939 by HMS Scotstoun north of Iceland and escorted to Leith. To MoWT and renamed Empire Unity. Torpedoed on 4 May 1945 and damaged by U-979 south-west of Iceland (64°23′N 22°27′W) and abandoned. Later reboarded and sailed to Hvitanes, Faroe Islands and then on to Reykjavík for temporary repairs. Departed Reykjavík on 20 June 1945 under tow bound for Methil and then Leith where she was repaired. Sold in 1947 to Store ship Transports Ltd, London and renamed Stordale. Sold in 1961 to T Pappadrinitriou, Greece and renamed Mageolia. Arrived under tow on 9 October 1963 at Cerigo where she was used as a depot ship. Arrived under tow on 12 April 1966 at Burriana, Spain for scrapping.

=== Empire Upland ===
Empire Upland was a 683 GRT dredger which was built by William Simons & Co Ltd, Renfrew. Launched on 26 December 1944 and completed in February 1945. Sold in 1945 to the Superintendent Civil Engineer, Bombay. To the Indian Navy in 1949 and renamed INS Nirmal.

=== Empire Ure ===
Empire Ure was a 2,570 GRT cargo ship which was built by Van Duivendijks Scheepswerft, Lekkerkerk. Launched in 1920 as Willem Van Driel Sr.. Sold in 1927 to Kohlen-Import und Poseidon, Königsberg, renamed Rheinland. Requisitioned by the Kriegsmarine in 1940. Seized as a prize in May 1945. To MoWT and renamed Empire Ure. Sold in 1947 to Crete Shipping Co., renamed Amberstone. Sold in 1950 to D. A. Psychoyos, Greece and renamed Metamorfosis. Ran aground at Ijmuiden on 2 December 1950. Broke in two, a total loss.

=== Empire Usk ===
Empire Usk was a 3,229 GRT cargo ship which was built by Tyne Iron Shipbuilding Co Ltd, Newcastle upon Tyne. Completed in 1918 as War Combe. Sold in 1920 to Oakwin Steamship Co and renamed Watsness. Operated under the management of Sir W R Smith & Sons Ltd. Sold in 1927 to Mervyn Steamship Co, Newport, Monmouthshire and renamed Marklyn. Ran aground on 20 January 1942 at Crammag Head, Port Logan. Cargo of iron ore discharged but she was damaged further in storms. Refloated on 5 June 1942 and arrived under tow on 17 June 1942 at Glasgow. Repaired, to MoWT and renamed Empire Usk. Sold in 1946 to Constants (South Wales) Ltd and renamed Heminge. Sold in 1948 to Crete Shipping Co Ltd, London and renamed Bluestone. Sold in 1953 to Grosvenor Shipping Co and renamed Grosvenor Mariner. Operated under the management of Moller Line (UK) Ltd. Scrapped in September 1955 in Hong Kong.

== Suffix beginning with V ==
=== Empire Valour ===
Empire Valour was a 2,906 GRT cargo ship which was built by William Gray & Co Ltd, West Hartlepool. Launched on 22 February 1943 and completed in May 1943. Sold in 1948 to Eskgarth Shipping Co Ltd and renamed Eskgarth. Operated under the management of H M Lund, London. Sold in 1951 to Uskside Steamship Co Ltd and renamed Uskmouth. Operated under the management of R W Jones & Co, Newport. Sold in 1963 to Compagnia Marabello San Nicolas, Panama and renamed Alexandra K. Sold in 1968 to Pateras Bros Ltd, Greece and renamed Aristios II. Sold in 1969 to Reinato Marino Navigazione SA, Panama. Scrapped in June 1971 in Piraeus, Greece.

=== Empire Vauxhall ===
Empire Vauxhall was a 2,025 GRT collier which was built by Grangemouth Dockyard Co Ltd, Grangemouth. Launched on 30 November 1944 and completed in March 1945. Sold in 1946 to William France, Fenwick & Co Ltd and renamed Braywood. Sold in 1960 to Faruk & Ozmelek, Turkey and renamed Abdullah. Sold in 1976 to Kalkavan Ziya Koll, Sirketi, Turkey and renamed Taylan Kalkavan. Scrapped in April 1982 at Aliaga, Turkey.

=== Empire Venture ===
Empire Venture was a 12,639 GRT factory ship which was built by Swan, Hunter & Wigham Richardson Ltd, Newcastle upon Tyne. Completed in 1929 as Vikingen. Sold in 1938 to Hamburger Walfang-Kontor GmbH, Hamburg and renamed Wikinger. Requisitioned in 1939 by the Kriegsmarine. Formally seized by Royal Navy on 16 June 1945 at Kiel. To Howaldtswerke yards, Kiel, for repair and refit, August–November 1945. To MoWT November 1945 and renamed Empire Venture. Deployed to the Southern Ocean on British account c 20 November 1945. Allocated to USSR by Tripartite Merchant Marine Commission at Berlin, 7 December 1945. Whaling equipment fitted at Kiel removed at Liverpool, June–September 1946. Handed over to USSR in Britain 26 September 1946 and renamed Slava. Re-refitted, presumably at Liverpool, September–December 1946. Sailed from Liverpool 22 December 1946 for the first Soviet whaling season in the Antarctic. Sold to Japanese buyer in 1971 and renamed Fuji Maru. Scrapped in October 1971 at Kaohsiung, Taiwan.

=== Empire Venus ===
Empire Venus was an 8,159 GRT tanker which was built by Harland & Wolff Ltd, Govan. Laid down as Empire Venus but taken over by the Admiralty on 28 January 1944 and name cancelled. Launched on 6 July 1944 and completed in November 1944 as RFA Wave Monarch for the Royal Fleet Auxiliary. Sold in March 1960 to H G Pound, Portsmouth and used as an oil hulk at Le Havre, replacing RFA Wave Conqueror. Sold in 1960 to Società Miroline and renamed Noema. Arrived on 8 April 1964 at Bilbao, Spain for scrapping.

=== Empire Vera ===
Empire Vera was a 292 GRT tug which was built by Cochrane & Sons Ltd, Selby. Launched on 14 May 1945 and completed in December 1945. Sold in 1947 to United Towing Co Ltd and renamed Rifleman. New steam engine fitted in 1949. On 3 June 1949 she was assisting Tradesman towing SS Norjerv to Strangford Lough, Northern Ireland, for scrapping when Norjerv broke in two and sank. Scrapped in November 1967 at Blyth, Northumberland.

=== Empire Viceroy ===
Empire Viceroy was a 7,803 GRT (10,360 DWT) heavy lift ship which was built by Vickers-Armstrongs Ltd, Barrow in Furness. Launched on 8 April 1943 and completed in August 1943. Sold in 1954 to Gypsum Carriers Inc and renamed Harry Lundeberg. Operated under the management of Kaiser Gypsum Co, United States. Renamed Ocean Carrier in 1957. Laid up on 13 November 1971 at Los Angeles. Arrived on 11 July 1973 under tow at Kaohsiung, Taiwan for scrapping.

=== Empire Victory ===
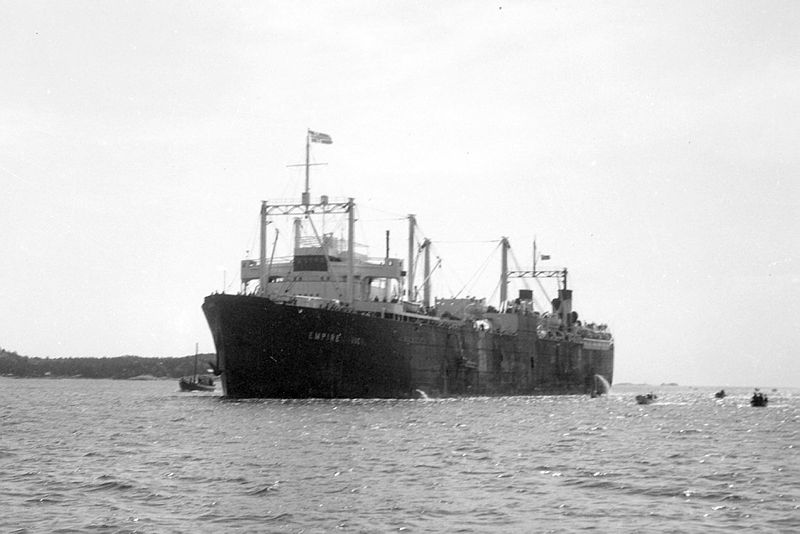
Empire Victory

Empire Victory was a 21,846 GRT factory ship which was built by Deutsche Schiff- und Maschinenbau AG, Bremen. Completed in 1937 as Unitas for Unitas Deutsche Walfang GmbH. Requisitioned in 1939 by the Kriegsmarine. Seized in May 1945 at Flensburg. To MoWT and renamed Empire Victory. The Bomb damage was repaired in July 1946 by Harland & Wolff, Southampton. Then refitted by Silley, Cox & Co Ltd, Falmouth, Cornwall. To Ministry of Food, operated under the management of United Whalers Ltd. Sold in 1950 to Union Whaling Co Ltd, South Africa and renamed Abraham Larsen. Sold in 1957 to Taiyo Gyogyo KK, Japan. Rebuilt with new diesel engines, now 27,059 GRT and renamed Nisshin Maru No 2. Scrapped in March 1987 at Kaohsiung, Taiwan.

=== Empire Vigilance ===
Empire Vigilance was an 8,093 GRT tanker which was built by Harland & Wolff Ltd Govan. Launched on 18 February 1942 and completed in May 1942 as British Vigilance for British Tanker Co Ltd. Torpedoed on 3 January 1943 while sailing in Convoy TM 1 and damaged by U-514 at 29°58′N 44°40′W and abandoned. Torpedoed on 24 January 1943 and sunk by U-105.

=== Empire Viking I ===
Empire Viking I was a 250 GRT whaler which was built by Smiths Dock Co Ltd, Middlesbrough. Completed in 1929 as Vikingen I. Sold in 1938 to Hamburger Walfang-Kontor GmbH, Hamburg and renamed Wiking 1. Requisitioned in 1939 by the Kriegsmarine. Seized by Royal Navy on 18 October 1945 at Kiel. To MoWT and renamed Empire Viking I. Allocated to USSR by Tripartite Merchant Marine Commission at Berlin, 7 December 1945. Deployed to the Southern Ocean on British account late November 1945. Handed over to USSR in Britain September 1946 and renamed Slava VIII.

=== Empire Viking II ===
Empire Viking II was a 250 GRT whaler which was built by Smiths Dock Co Ltd, Middlesbrough. Completed in 1929 as Vikingen II. Sold in 1938 to Hamburger Walfang-Kontor GmbH, Hamburg and renamed Wiking 2. Requisitioned in 1939 by the Kriegsmarine. Seized by Royal Navy on 18 October 1945 at Kiel. To MoWT and renamed Empire Viking II. Allocated to USSR by Tripartite Merchant Marine Commission at Berlin, 7 December 1945. Deployed to the Southern Ocean on British account late November 1945. Handed over to the USSR in Britain, September 1946 and renamed Slava IX.

=== Empire Viking III ===
Empire Viking III was a 250 GRT whaler which was built by Smiths Dock Co Ltd, Middlesbrough. Completed in 1929 as Vikingen III. Sold in 1938 to Hamburger Walfang-Kontor GmbH, Hamburg and renamed Wiking 3. Requisitioned in 1939 by the Kriegsmarine. Seized by Royal Navy on 18 October 1945 at Kiel. To MoWT and renamed Empire Viking III. Allocated to USSR by Tripartite Merchant Marine Commission at Berlin, 7 December 1945. Deployed to the Southern Ocean on British account late November 1945. Handed over to the USSR in Britain, September 1946 and renamed Slava X.

=== Empire Viking VI ===
Empire Viking VI was a 381 GRT whaler which was built by Deutsche Schiff- und Maschinenbau, Bremen. Completed in 1939 as Wiking 6 for Hamburger Walfang-Kontor GmbH, Hamburg. Requisitioned in 1940 by the Kriegsmarine. Seized by Royal Navy on 29 October 1945 at Emden. To MoWT and renamed Empire Viking VI. Allocated to USSR by Tripartite Merchant Marine Commission at Berlin, 7 December 1945. Deployed to the Southern Ocean on British account late November 1945. Handed over to the USSR in Britain, September 1946 and renamed Slava II.

=== Empire Viking VIII ===
Empire Viking VIII was a 381 GRT whaler which was built by Deutsche Schiff- und Maschinenbau, Bremen. Completed in 1939 as Wiking 8 for Hamburger Walfang-Kontor GmbH, Hamburg. Requisitioned in 1940 by the Kriegsmarine. Seized by Royal Navy on 29 October 1945 at Emden. To MoWT and renamed Empire Viking VIII. Allocated to USSR by Tripartite Merchant Marine Commission at Berlin, 7 December 1945. Deployed to the Southern Ocean on British account late November 1945. Handed over to the USSR in Britain, September 1946 and renamed Slava III.

=== Empire Viking IX ===
Empire Viking IX was a 381 GRT whaler which was built by Deutsche Schiff- und Maschinenbau, Bremen. Completed in 1939 as Wiking 9 for Hamburger Walfang-Kontor GmbH, Hamburg. Requisitioned in 1940 by the Kriegsmarine. Seized by Royal Navy on 29 October 1945 at Emden. To MoWT and renamed Empire Viking IX. Allocated to USSR by Tripartite Merchant Marine Commission at Berlin, 7 December 1945. Deployed to the Southern Ocean on British account late November 1945. Handed over to the USSR in Britain, September 1946 and renamed Slava IV.

=== Empire Viking X ===
Empire Viking X was a 370 GRT whaler which was built by Deutsche Schiff- und Maschinenbau, Bremen. Completed in 1939 as Wiking 10 for Hamburger Walfang-Kontor GmbH, Hamburg. Requisitioned in 1940 by the Kriegsmarine. Seized by Royal Navy on 29 October 1945 at Emden. To MoWT and renamed Empire Viking X. Allocated to USSR by Tripartite Merchant Marine Commission at Berlin, 7 December 1945. Deployed to the Southern Ocean on British account late November 1945. Handed over to the USSR in Britain in September 1946 and renamed Slava V.

=== Empire Villager ===
Empire Villager was a 2,066 GRT collier which was built by Grangemouth Dockyard Co Ltd, Grangemouth. Launched on 31 August 1943 and completed in November 1943. Sold in 1946 to F T Everard & Sons Ltd and renamed Grit. Sold in 1957 to Bankstone Shipping Co Ltd and renamed Bankstone. Operated under the management of Stone & Rolfe Ltd, Swansea. Sold in 1959 to Virtu Steamship Co Ltd, Malta and renamed Saver. Sold in 1965 to Marespuma Compagnia Navigazione, Panama and renamed Christoyannis. Operated under the management of A P Venetsanos, Greece. Sold in 1967 to Ann Poulos, Greece. Scrapped in November 1967 at Perama, Greece.

=== Empire Vincent ===
Empire Vincent was a 275 GRT tug which was built by Cochrane & Sons Ltd, Selby. Launched on 3 September 1943 and completed in January 1944. Transferred in December 1945 to the Thai Government. Later transferred to the Royal Thai Navy and served as HTMS Samaesan, pennant number YTB 7. Laid up in 1982 in the Chao Phraya River, Bangkok. Scrapped in 1983.

=== Empire Viscount ===
Empire Viscount was an 8,882 GRT tanker which was built by R Duncan & Co Ltd, Port Glasgow. Completed in 1929 as Athelviscount for United Molasses Co Ltd. Damaged on 31 August 1940 by bombing at Cammell Laird's shipyard, Birkenhead. Torpedoed on 21 March 1942 and damaged by U-202 at 38°46′N 55°44′W. Salvage tug reached her on 26 March. Towed to John's, Newfoundland. A journey not without problems as three U-boats were reported in the area and the vessels encountered storms and both drifted eastwards when the towline parted. Spotted by an aircraft on 4 April when still 100 nautical miles (190 km) offshore having been assumed by the Admiralty that both ships had foundered. Arrived at St John's with Athelviscount drawing 41 feet (12.50 m) aft and her bows high in the air. Moored to a buoy as she was unable to be drydocked but broke free on 9 April and grounded at the harbour entrance. Refloated and docked on 23 May for temporary repairs to be carried out. Departed under tow on 30 June bound for New York where permanent repairs were carried out. To MoWT and renamed Empire Viscount. Returned to United Molasses in 1946 and renamed Athelviscount. Scrapped in October 1957 at Hendrik-Ido-Ambacht, Netherlands.

=== Empire Voice ===
Empire Voice was a 6,828 GRT cargo ship which was built by Barclay, Curle & Co Ltd, Glasgow. Launched on 3 September 1940 and completed in November 1940. Sold in 1946 to Booth Steamship Co Ltd and renamed Bernard. Sold in 1947 to Lamport & Holt Line Ltd and renamed Byron. Renamed Lalande in 1953. Sold in 1961 to William Brandt & Sons Ltd and renamed Uncle Batt. Arrived on 8 September 1961 at Moji, Japan for scrapping.

=== Empire Volunteer ===
Empire Volunteer was a 5,319 GRT cargo ship which was built by Harbour Marine Ltd, Victoria, British Columbia. Completed in 1921 as Canadian Traveller. Sold in 1932 to Achille Lauro & Co, Naples and renamed Procida. Seized on 10 June 1940 at Cardiff. Handed over to MoWT and renamed Empire Volunteer. Torpedoed on 15 September 1940 and sunk by U-48 at 56°43′N 15°17′W while a member of Convoy SC 3.

== Suffix beginning with W ==
=== Empire Wagtail ===
Empire Wagtail was a 4,893 GRT cargo ship which was built by Todd Drydock and Construction Company, Tacoma, Washington. Completed in 1919 as Ossining for the United States Shipping Board (USSB). Sold in 1932 to Gulf Pacific Mail Line Inc and renamed Point Lobos. Operated under the management of Swayne & Hoyt Inc, San Francisco. It became the scene of a widely reported murder while anchored in Alameda in 1936. To MoWT in 1941 and renamed Empire Wagtail. Torpedoed on 28 December 1942 and sunk by U-260 at 43°17′N 27°22′W while a member of Convoy ONS 154.

=== Empire Waimana ===
Empire Waimana was an 8,129 GRT refrigerated cargo liner which was built by Workman, Clark & Co Ltd, Belfast. Completed in 1911 as Waimana for Shaw, Savill & Albion Line Ltd. Requisitioned as a troopship during the First World War. Detained at Newport News, Virginia on 28 August 1915 as she had been armed with a 4.7-inch (120 mm) gun. Detention lasted until 22 September and the ship was only released once the gun had been dismantled and put ashore. Chartered by the Aberdeen line in 1926 and renamed Herminius. Returned to Shaw, Savill in 1932 and renamed Waimana. Laid up in Gareloch in 1939. Purchased by the Admiralty and converted to a dummy battleship representing HMS Resolution. To MoWT in 1942 and renamed Empire Waimana, reconverted for trade as there was a shortage of refrigerated cargo ships. Returned to Shaw, Savill & Albion Line Ltd in 1946 and renamed Waimana. In February 1951, she towed the liberty type ship SS San Leonardo 300 nautical miles (560 km) from Cape Northumberland, South Australia to Melbourne after the latter had lost her propeller. Arrived on 27 January 1952 at Milford Haven, Pembrokeshire for scrapping.

=== Empire Wall ===
Empire Wall was the intended name of a cargo ship which was to have been built by Hong Kong & Whampoa Dockyard Co Ltd, Hong Kong. Laid down on 24 June 1941. In 1945 she was 80% complete with all materials needed to complete her available. Scrapped in May 1950.

=== Empire Wallace ===
Empire Wallace was a 7,800 GRT cargo ship which was built by Greenock Dockyard Co Ltd, Greenock. Launched on 4 September 1945 and completed in February 1946. Sold in 1956 to Ben Line Steamers Ltd and renamed Benarty. Th engines were removed in 1962 at Hong Kong ready for replacement but came ashore on 1 September 1962 at Kowloon Docks during Typhoon Wanda. Refloated on 14 September 1962, repaired and fitted with a new diesel engine. Sold in 1963 to Harbour Line Ltd, Bermuda and renamed Elys Harbour. Operated under the management of Mollers Ltd, Hong Kong. Sold in 1967 to Unique Development Co Inc, Liberia and renamed Unique Developer. Operated under the management of R Y Chen, Hong Kong. Sold in 1969 to Taboga Enterprises Inc, Panama and renamed Fermenco. Chartered in 1973 by Compagnia Agropecuaria y Maritima Santa Rosa Ltd, Colombia, returning to Taboga Enterprises later that year. Sold in 1974 to Wayne Inc, Panama and renamed Avalon. Sold in 1981 to Pizano SA and renamed Bahia Columbia. Operated under the management of Abella Compagnia Ltda, Barranquilla Colombia. Arrived on 5 December 1988 at Chittagong, Bangladesh for scrapping.

=== Empire Walter ===
Empire Walter was a 244 GRT tug which was built by Henry Scarr Ltd, Hessle. Launched on 30 December 1943 and completed in March 1944. Sold in 1946 to C J King & Sons Ltd, Bristol and renamed Sea Queen. Scrapped in June 1974 at Gijón, Spain.

=== Empire Wandle ===
Empire Wandle was a 3,093 GRT cargo ship which was built by Flensburger Schiff- Gesellschaft. Completed in 1935 as Wilhelm Traber for W Traber & Co, Hamburg. Seized in May 1945 at Brunsbüttel. To MoWT and renamed Empire Wandle. Allocated to the US in 1947. To United States Maritime Commission (USMC) and renamed Yankee Dawn. Operated under the management of William C Atwater & Co Inc, Fall River, Massachusetts. Sold in 1948 to Fall River Navigation Co, New York. Sold in 1950 to Oliver J Olsen & Co, San Francisco and renamed Cynthia Olsen. Scrapped in March 1971 in the USA.

=== Empire Wansbeck ===
Empire Wansbeck was a 3,508 GRT troopship which was built by Danziger Werft AG, Danzig. Launched in 1939 as refrigerated cargo ship Linz for Norddeutscher Lloyd and completed at Odense Staalskibsværft, Odense, Denmark. Requisitioned by the Kriegsmarine and used as a minelayer. Seized in May 1945 at Kiel Fjord. To MoWT and rebuilt as a troopship, renamed Empire Wansbeck. Operated under the management of Wilson Line. Sold in 1962 to Kavounides Bros, Greece and renamed Esperos. Converted to a passenger ship. Withdrawn in March 1980, scrapped in 1981 in Spain.

=== Empire Wapping ===
Empire Wapping was a 2,025 GRT collier which was built by Grangemouth Dockyard Co Ltd, Grangemouth. Launched on 15 March 1945 and completed in May 1945. Sold in 1947 to Thomas Stone Shipping Ltd and renamed Maystone. Operated under the management of Stone & Rolfe Ltd, Swansea. Collided on 18 October 1949 with HMS Albion and sank 4 nautical miles (7.4 km) off the Longstone Lighthouse.

=== Empire Warlock ===
Empire Warlock was a 254 GRT tug which was built by Ferguson Brothers Ltd, Port Glasgow. Launched on 23 July 1942 and completed in September 1942. Sold in 1947 to the Egyptian Government and renamed Sakr.

=== Empire Warner ===
Empire Warner was a 2,961 GRT cargo ship built by Ailsa Shipbuilding Co Ltd, Troon. It was launched on 21 March 1946 as Empire Warner but sold while under construction and completed in June 1946 as Uskside for Uskside Steamship Co Ltd., operated under the management of R W Jones & Co, Newport. She was sold in 1965 to N Michalos & Sons Maritime Co Ltd, Greece and renamed Gero Michalos. Ran aground on 10 May 1968 in a cyclone at Akyab, Burma and broke up. Declared a total loss.

=== Empire Warrior ===
Empire Warrior was a 1,306 GRT cargo ship which was built by Hamburg-Elbe Schiffsbau, Hamburg. Completed in 1921 as Bianca. Sold in 1927 to A Kirsten, Hamburg and renamed Elbe. 1932 renamed Bianca again. Captured on 20 October 1939 in the North Sea by HMS Transylvania and escorted to Kirkwall, Orkney Islands. To MoWT and renamed Empire Warrior. Damaged on 19 June 1941 by bombing off Vila Real de Santo António, Portugal. Crew rescued by a Marinha Portuguesa destroyer. A trawler attempted to tow her to shallow water but she broke free and sank.

=== Empire Waterhen ===
Empire Waterhen was a 5,948 GRT (7,500 DWT) cargo ship which was built by Oscar Daniels Shipbuilding Co, Tampa, Florida. Completed in 1920 as Manatee for the USSB. To USMC in 1937 and MoWT in 1941, renamed Empire Waterhen. Sunk on 9 June 1944 as a blockship as part of Gooseberry 4, Juno Beach, Courseulles, Calvados, France. Raised in 1948 and scrapped at Penarth, Glamorgan.

=== Empire Wave ===
Empire Wave was a 7,463 GRT CAM ship which was built by J L Thompson & Sons Ltd, Sunderland. Launched on 28 March 1941 and completed in July 1941. Torpedoed on 2 October 1941 and sunk by U-562 at 59°08′N 32°26′W while a member of Convoy ON 19.

=== Empire Waveney ===
Empire Waveney was a 16,754 GRT ocean liner which was built by Blohm & Voss, Hamburg. Completed in 1929 as Milwaukee for Hamburg America Line. Requisitioned by the Kriegsmarine in 1940 and used as an accommodation ship and depot ship at Kiel. Bombed by the RAF to prevent her from being used as an escape ship by top-ranking Nazi personnel. Seized in May 1945 at Kiel and used by the United States Navy as a transport ship. Allocated to the USA but declined as her electrical system was of the single-pole type. To MoWT in October 1945 and renamed Empire Waveney. To Liverpool for a refit. Caught fire on 8 February 1946 while in drydock. Caught fire on 2 March at the Canada Dock, Liverpool, gutted and sank. Refloated on 4 May and drydocked. Declared to be a total loss. Departed on 26 January 1947 under tow bound for Dalmuir, West Dunbartonshire for breaking. Departed on 25 September 1947 under tow bound for Troon for final demolition.

=== Empire Weaver ===
Empire Weaver was a 2,822 GRT cargo ship which was built by Lübecker Flenderwerke AG, Lübeck. Completed in 1939 as Dalbek for Knorh & Burchard, Hamburg. Seized in May 1945 at Rendsburg. To MoWT and renamed Empire Weaver. Allocated in 1946 to the USSR and renamed Chernigov. Scrapped in June 1969 at Split, Yugoslavia.

=== Empire Webster ===
Empire Webster was a 7,043 GRT cargo ship which was built by Short Brothers Ltd, Sunderland. Launched on 18 July 1942 and completed in October 1942. Torpedoed on 7 February 1943 and sunk by U-77 off Algiers (36°47′N 01°37′E) while a member of Convoy KMS 8.

=== Empire Welfare ===
Empire Welfare was a 7,083 GRT cargo ship which was built by J L Thompson & Sons Ltd, Sunderland. Launched on 11 November 1943 and completed in January 1944. To the French Government in 1945 and renamed Matelot Becuwe. Sold in 1949 to Société Algeriènne de Navigation and renamed Marcel Schiaffino. Operated under the management of Charles Schiaffino et Compagnie, Algiers. Sold in 1965 to Bulet, Bulgaria and renamed Desmin. Sold in 1968 to Navigation Maritime Bulgare, Bulgaria and renamed Stefan Karadja. Scrapped in 1973 in Yugoslavia.

=== Empire Welland ===
Empire Welland was a 17,780 GRT ocean liner which was built by Deutsche Werft, Hamburg. Completed in 1938 as MV Patria. Requisitioned in 1940 by the Kriegsmarine. This was the ship on which Admiral Dönitz and the German High Command surrendered to the Allies in Flensburg. Seized, to MoWT and refitted as a troopship by Harland & Wolff Ltd, Belfast and renamed Empire Welland. Allocated on 29 January 1946 by the Prize Court to the United Kingdom. Agreement reached with the USSR and passed to them in 1946 and renamed Rossia, later Rossiya. Renamed Aniva in 1985 and arrived in December 1985 at Kure, Japan for scrapping.

=== Empire Wensum ===
Empire Wensum was a 2,515 GRT cargo ship which was built by Richardson, Duck & Co Ltd, Stockton on Tees. Completed in 1910 as Rotherhill. Sold in 1925 to Sauber & Co, Hamburg and renamed Robert Sauber. Requisitioned in 1940 by the Kriegsmarine. Seized in May 1945 at Flensburg, to MoWT and renamed Empire Wensum. Sold in 1947 to Mooringwell Steamship Co and renamed Bruce M. Sold in 1956 to Compagnia de Transportes Maritime, Panama and renamed Sorengo. Scrapped in December 1966 at Spezia, Italy.

=== Empire Wessex ===
Empire Wessex was an 11,138 GRT cargo liner built by Harland & Wolff Ltd, Belfast. Launched on 5 December 1945 and completed in August 1946 as Port Hobart for Port Line Ltd. Scrapped in September 1970 in Shanghai, China.

=== Empire Wey ===
Empire Wey was a 2,645 GRT cargo ship which was built by Nakskov Skibs Akt, Nakskov, Denmark. Completed in 1944 as Robert Bornhofen for Robert Bornhofen, Hamburg. Requisitioned on completion by the Kriegsmarine. Seized in May 1945 at Copenhagen. To MoWT and renamed Empire Wey. Allocated in 1946 to the USSR and renamed Yakutsk. Scrapped in 1970 in the USSR.

=== Empire Whale ===
Empire Whale was a 6,049 GRT cargo ship which was built by Federal Shipbuilding Co, Kearny, New Jersey. Completed in 1919 as Winona County for USSB. To MoWT in 1941 and renamed Empire Whale. Torpedoed on 29 March 1943 and sunk by U-662 at 46°44′N 16°38′W while a member of Convoy SL 126.

=== Empire Wharfe ===
Empire Wharfe was a 3,072 GRT cargo ship which was built by Öresundsvarvet, Landskrona, Sweden. Completed in 1938 as Viator. Sold in 1939 to H Schuldt & Co, Hamburg and renamed Angelburg. Requisitioned in 1939 by the Kriegsmarine for use as a target ship by the 24th U-boat Flotilla. Participated in the evacuation of German Forces and refugees from East Prussia to Germany in 1944–45. Seized in May 1945 and used as a hospital ship at Flensburg. To MoWT in 1946 and renamed Empire Wharfe. Caught fire on 31 December 1946 off Lagos. Arrived on 2 January 1947 at Lagos and beached in Badagry Creek. Refloated on 6 January. Repaired and sold in 1947 to Elders & Fyffes Ltd and renamed Zent. Scrapped in 1962 in Bruges, Belgium.

=== Empire Whimbrel ===
Empire Whimbrel was a 5,983 GRT cargo ship which was built by Moore Shipbuilding Co. Oakland, California. Completed in June 1919 as Monasses for the USSB. To MoWT in 1941 and renamed Empire Whimbrel. Torpedoed on 11 April 1943 and sunk by U-181 400 nautical miles (740 km) south south west of Freetown, Sierra Leone (02°31′N 15°55′W).

=== Empire Widgeon ===
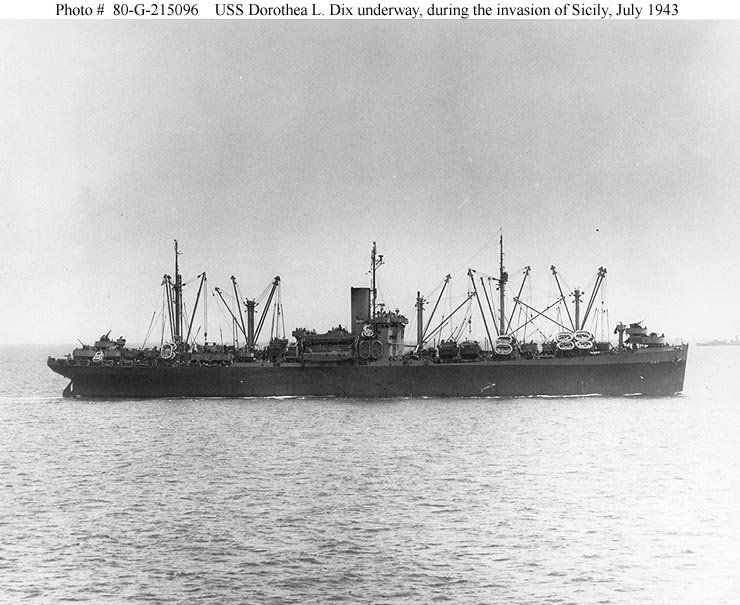
USS Dorothea L Dix

Empire Widgeon was a 6,736 GRT C3-E type ship which was built in the Bethlehem Fore River Shipyard, Quincy, Massachusetts. Completed in August 1940 as Exemplar for American Export Lines. To MoWT in 1941 and renamed Empire Widgeon. To USMC in 1942 and renamed Exemplar. Conversion to a transport ship by Bethlehem Steel completed in September 1942. To US Navy as Dorothea L Dix. To American Export Lines in April 1946 and renamed Exemplar. Scrapped in November 1968 at Alicante, Spain.

=== Empire Wildebeeste ===
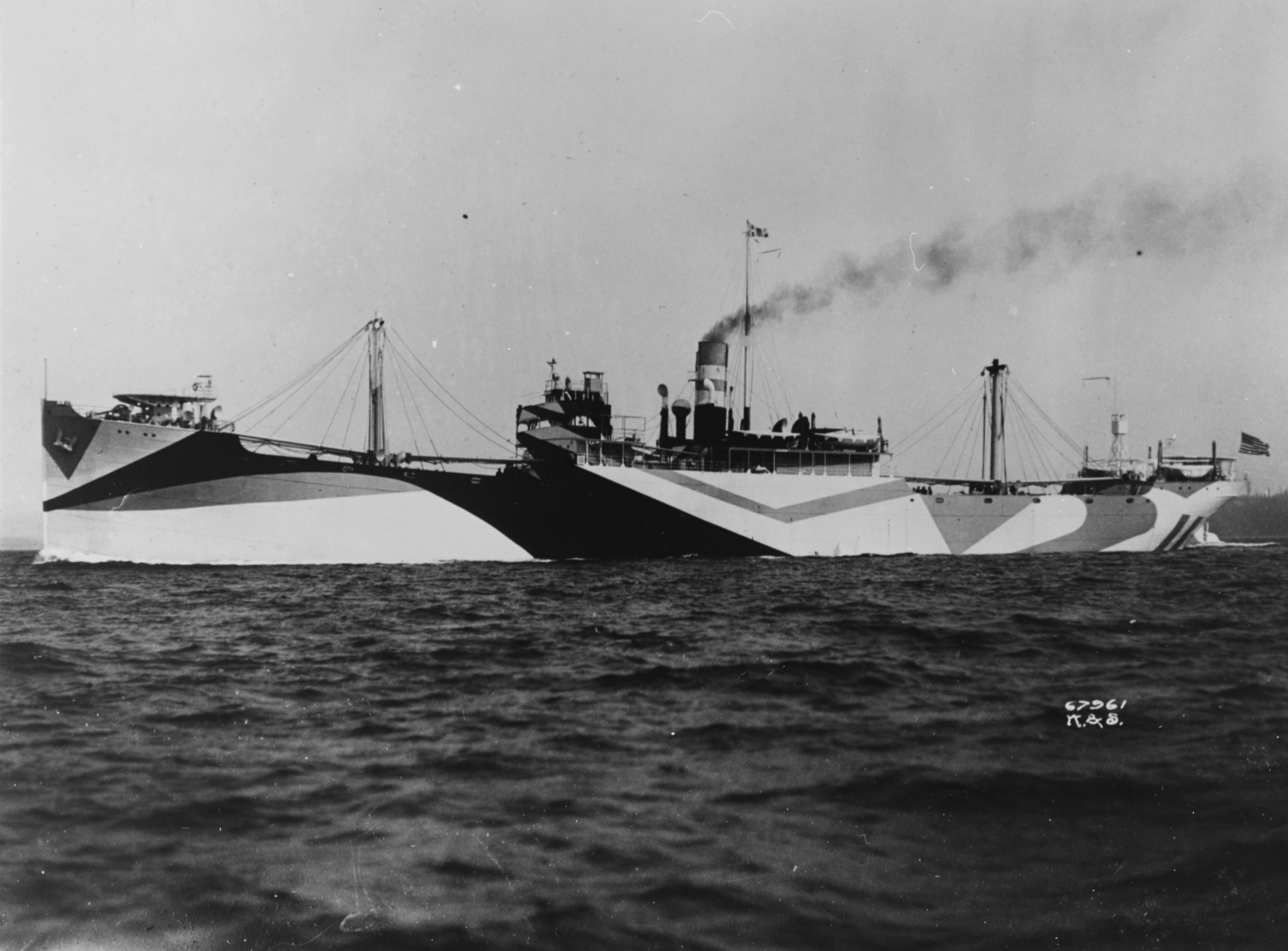
USS West Ekonk

Empire Wildebeeste was a 5,631 GRT cargo ship which was built by Skinner & Eddy, Seattle. Completed in 1918 as West Ekonk for the USSB. Sold in 1933 to Lykes Brothers-Ripley Steamship Co . To MoWT in 1941 and renamed Empire Wildebeeste. Torpedoed on 29 September 1942 and sunk by U-596 at 56°20′N 38°10′W while a member of Convoy SC 100.

=== Empire Willow ===
Empire Willow was a 129 GRT tug which was built by R Dunston Ltd, Thorne. Launched on 29 May 1941 and completed in October 1941. Allocated in 1947 to the Polish Government and renamed Ŀos. Deleted from shipping registers in 1962.

=== Empire Wilson ===
Empire Wilson was a 9,916 GRT cargo liner which was built by C Connell & Co Ltd, Glasgow. Launched on 18 August 1944 and completed in December 1944. Sold in 1946 to Union-Castle Mail Steamship Co Ltd and renamed Kenilworth Castle. Arrived on 4 June 1967 at Hong Kong for scrapping.

=== Empire Wily ===
Empire Wily was a 6,343 GRT cargo ship which was built by Lithgows Ltd, Port Glasgow. Launched on 26 March 1940 as Dalesman for T & J Harrison Ltd. Completed in May 1940. Bombed on 14 May 1941 by German aircraft at Suda Bay, Crete and sunk. Salvaged by German forces and renamed Pluto. Bombed at Trieste and sunk (date unknown). Salvaged by the British in May 1945 and rebuilt at Trieste. To MoWT and renamed Empire Wily. Returned to T & J Harrison and renamed Dalesman. Arrived on 15 September 1959 at Ghent, Belgium for scrapping.

=== Empire Wind ===
Empire Wind was a 7,459 GRT cargo ship which was built by J L Thompson & Sons Ltd, Sunderland. Launched on 9 July 1940 and completed in September 1940. Bombed on 13 November 1940 by German aircraft and sank at 53°48′N 15°52′W.

=== Empire Windrush ===
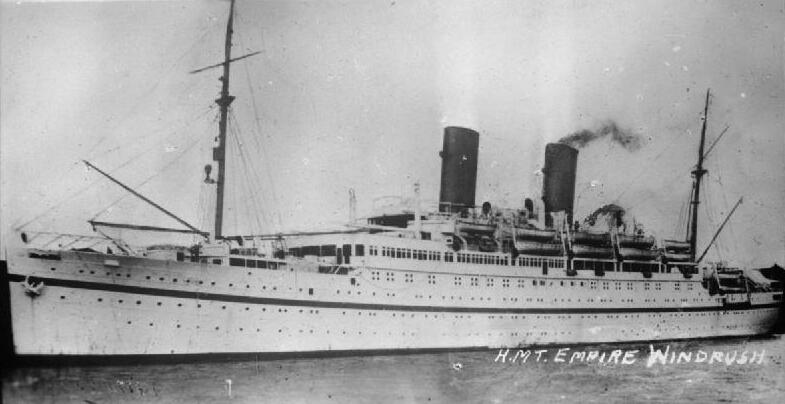
Empire Windrush

Empire Windrush was a 14,651 GRT ocean liner which was built by Blohm & Voss, Hamburg. Completed in 1930 as Monte Rosa for Hamburg Südamerikanische Dampfschiffahrts-Gesellschaft, Hamburg. Requisitioned in 1940 by the Kriegsmarine and used as a barracks ship at Stettin until 1942. Later used as a troopship between Denmark and Norway. In October 1943 she was used as a repair ship for Tirpitz. Resumed trooping duties in 1944 and then used as a hospital ship in connection with the evacuation of German citizens from East Prussia. Struck a mine on 15 February 1945 off Hela and was towed to Gdynia. Temporary repairs were carried out and towed with 5,600 refugees to Copenhagen. Used there as a hospital ship. Departed Copenhagen under tow on 23 June 1945 for Kiel. Allocated to the United Kingdom in August 1945.

In November 1945 she was taken to Jarrow, Northumberland and laid up there until April 1946 when she was refitted as a troopship by Alex, Stephen & Sons Ltd, Glasgow. Renamed Empire Windrush in January 1947. Arrived at Tilbury in June 1948 with 500 Jamaican immigrants, among the first postwar immigrants to the United Kingdom from the Caribbean. Refitted at Southampton between April and August 1950. Caught fire on 28 March 1954 32 nautical miles (59 km) off Cape Caxine, Algiers and abandoned with the loss of four lives from 1,487 people aboard. Taken in tow by HMS Saintes but sank stern first on 29 March at 37°00′N 02°11′E.

=== Empire Winnie ===
Empire Winnie was a 487 GRT tug which was built by Clelands (Successors) Ltd, Willington Quay-on-Tyne. Launched on 2 September 1943 and completed in January 1944. Sold in 1946 to William Watkins Ltd and renamed Zealandia. Sold in 1952 to Adelaide Steamship Company Ltd, Australia and renamed Yuna. Sold in 1971 to C R Rotondella, Australia. Converted to a barge in 1973 and scrapped in April 1974 at Bunbury, Western Australia.

=== Empire Wisdom ===
Empire Wisdom was a 9,208 GRT refrigerated cargo liner which was built by Greenock Dock Company, Greenock. Launched on 29 July 1942 and completed in November 1942. Sold in 1946 to Blue Star Line Ltd and renamed Royal Star. Refitted in November 1961 by Bremer Vulkan, Vegesack. A new diesel engine was fitted and renamed Caledonia Star. Arrived on 1 December 1972 at Kaohsiung, Taiwan for scrapping.

=== Empire Witham ===
Empire Witham was a 1,923 GRT cargo ship which was built by J Cockerill SA, Hoboken, Belgium. Completed in 1944 as Aeolus for Neptun Line. Seized in May 1945 at Kiel. To MoWT and renamed Empire Witham. Sold in 1948 to Indo-China Steam Navigation Co Ltd, Hong Kong and renamed Choysang. Sold in 1961 to Hemisphere Shipping Co, Hong Kong and renamed Milford. Sold in 1967 to Continental Navigation Co, Panama and renamed Salamanca. Scrapped in May 1969 in Hong Kong.

=== Empire Wold ===
Empire Wold was a 268 GRT tug which was built by John Crown & Sons Ltd, Sunderland. Launched on 24 March 1942 and completed in June 1942. British records state that she was lost on 10 November 1944. Believed to have foundered at 64°08′N 22°38′W while attempting to assist Shirvan a British tanker and Icelandic passenger ship "Godafoss" which had both been torpedoed and sunk by U-300.

=== Empire Wolfe ===
Empire Wolfe was a 2,888 GRT cargo ship which was built by William Gray & Co Ltd, West Hartlepool. Launched on 26 July 1941 and completed in September 1941. Sold in 1946 to Ulster Steamship Co Ltd and renamed Wicklow Head. Operated under the management of G Heyn & Sons Ltd. Ran aground on 2 May 1947 at Joli Point, Port Mouton, Nova Scotia. Salvage was proposed by the ship was further damaged in storms between 8 and 12 June 1947 and was declared a constructive total loss.

=== Empire Woodcock ===
Empire Woodcock was a 5,572 GRT cargo ship which was built by the Ames Shipbuilding and Drydock Company, Seattle. Completed in November 1918 as West Cape for the USSB. Sold in 1927 to McCormick Steamship Co. To MoWT in 1940 and renamed Empire Woodcock. Allocated in 1942 to the Greek Government and renamed Epiros. Sold in 1948 to Zaunos, Stavrides & Cocolis, Greece. Sold in 1951 to Transworld Lines SA, Panama and renamed San Andrea. Scrapped in January 1953 at Stockton on Tees.

=== Empire Woodland ===
Empire Woodland was a 683 GRT dredger which was built by William Simons & Co Ltd, Greenock. Launched on 17 April 1946 and completed later that year as W 103 for the Admiralty. Renamed W 32 in 1948. To Ministry of Public Building and Works in 1963.

=== Empire Woodlark ===
Empire Woodlark was a 7,793 GRT troopship which was built by New York Shipbuilding Corp, Camden, New Jersey. Completed in July 1913 as cargo liner Congress for Pacific Coast Steamship Co. Caught fire on 14 September 1916 off Crescent City, California and gutted. Rebuilt at Seattle. Sold in 1918 to China Mail Steamship Co, New York and renamed Nanking. Owners bankrupt in 1922 she was seized and sold by Court Order. Sold in 1923 to Pacific Steamship Co Inc, Seattle and renamed Emma Alexander. To MoWT in 1940 and refitted as a troopship. Renamed Empire Woodlark in 1942. Scuttled on 2 November 1946 north of the Hebrides (59°00′N 07°40′W) with a cargo of obsolete chemical ammunition.

=== Empire Wordsworth ===
Empire Wordsworth was a 9,891 GRT tanker which was built by Sir J Laing & Sons Ltd, Sunderland. Launched on 29 May 1942 and completed in September 1942. Sold in 1945 to British Tanker Co Ltd and renamed British Lancer. Arrived on 10 September 1960 at Briton Ferry, Glamorgan for scrapping.

=== Empire Worthtown ===
Empire Worthtown was an 805 GRT cargo ship which was built by J Lewins & Sons Ltd., Aberdeen. Launched in 1939 as Worthtown for Williamstown Shipping Co. Ltd., London. Bombed and sunk at Dunkerque on 27 May 1940. Salvaged by the Germans in November 1942. Repaired and to Schulte & Bruns, Emden, renamed Ilse Schulte. Seized as a prize in May 1945. To MoWT, renamed Empire Worthtown. Sold in 1946 to Comben Longstaff & Co. Ltd, renamed Glamorganbrook. Sprang a leak and sank off Scarborough on 11 October 1946.

=== Empire Wrestler ===
Empire Wrestler was a 797 GRT coastal tanker which was built by Grangemouth Dockyard Co Ltd, Grangemouth. Launched on 22 May 1943 and completed in July 1943. Sold in 1946 to Anglo-American Oil Co Ltd and renamed Esso Genesee. Sold in 1951 to Esso Petroleum Co Ltd. Scrapped in 1961 at Tamise, Belgium.

=== Empire Wycliff ===
Empire Wycliff was a 6,066 GRT cargo ship which was built by Short Brothers Ltd, Sunderland. Launched on 28 July 1941 and completed in September 1941. Sold in 1946 to North Shipping Co and renamed North Anglia. Operated under the management of H Roberts & Sons Ltd, Newcastle upon Tyne. Sold in 1960 to Mariner Shipping Co Ltd, Hong Kong and renamed Happy Mariner. Scrapped in March 1967 at Hirohata, Japan.

=== Empire Wye ===
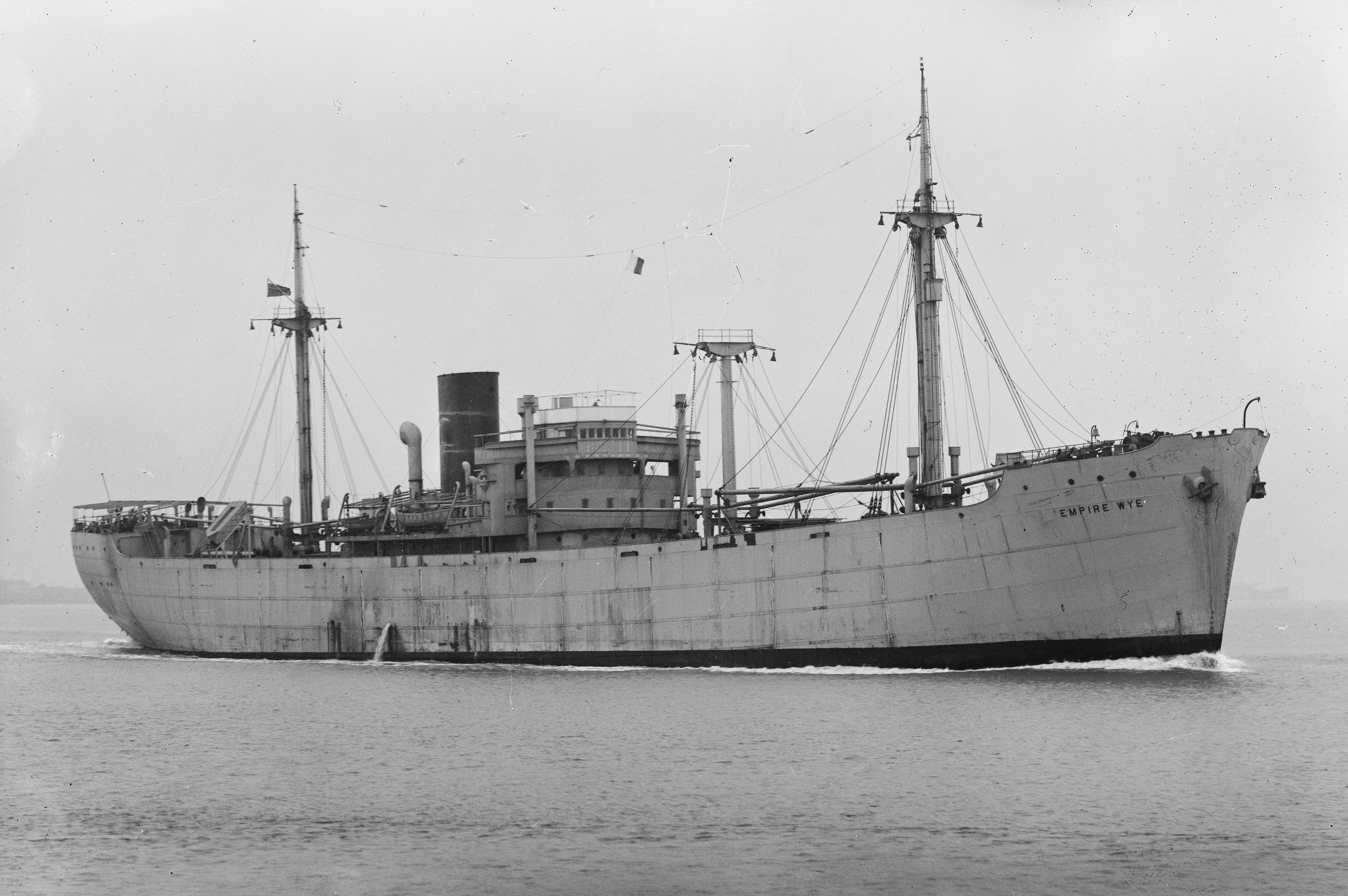
Empire Wye

Empire Wye was a 6,446 GRT cargo ship which was built by Bremer Vulkan Schiff- und Maschinenbau, Vegesack. Launched in 1944 as Esmeralda for Hamburg Südamerikanische Dampfschiffahrts-Gesellschaft, Hamburg. Completed in 1945 by Nederland Scheepsvaart, Amsterdam. Seized in May 1945 on the Kiel Canal. To MoWT and renamed Empire Wye. Sold in 1947 to Indo-China Steam Navigation Co Ltd and renamed Eastern Saga. Sold in 1968 to Southern Shipping & Enterprise Co, Hong Kong and renamed Nanfung. Sold in 1972 to Yick Fung Shipping & Entreprise Co, Hong Kong and renamed Nan Fung. Scrapped in 1975 in China.

== Suffix beginning with Y ==
=== Empire Yare ===
Empire Yare was a 4,701 GRT ocean liner built by Reiherstieg Schiffswerfte & Maschinenfabrik, Hamburg. Completed in 1922 as Wadai for Woermann Line, Hamburg. Requisitioned by the Kriegsmarine in 1939, used as an accommodation ship, school ship and then a target ship. Seized in May 1945 at Flensburg. To MoWT and renamed Empire Yare. Allocated in 1946 to the USSR and renamed Gogol. Converted to a fisheries training ship and based at Petropavlosk. Scrapped in 1971.

=== Empire Yukon ===
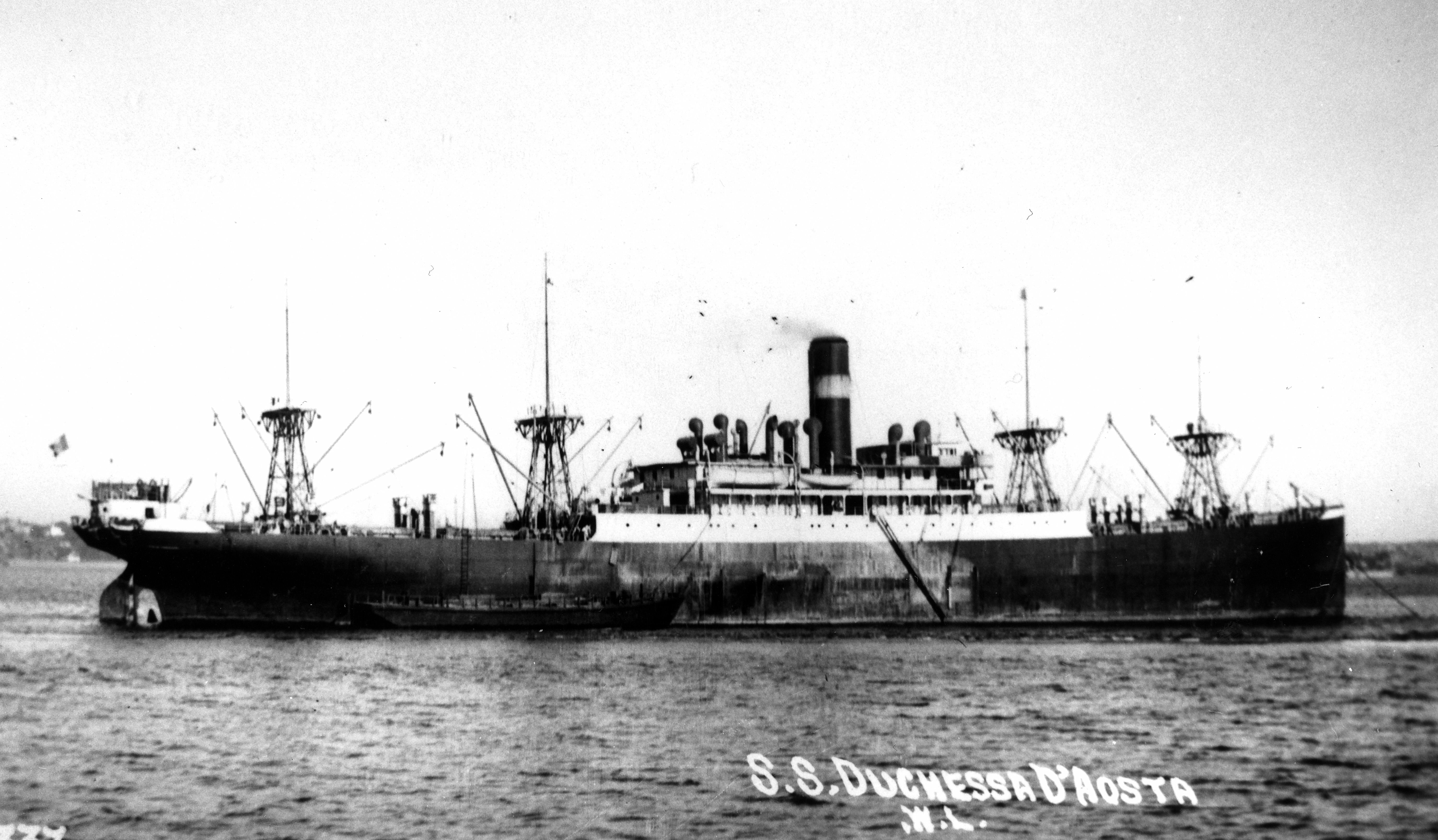
Duchessa D'Aosta, later Empire Yukon

Empire Yukon was a 7,651 GRT cargo liner built by Stabilimento Tecnico Triestino, Trieste, Completed in 1921 as Duchessa D'Aosta for Lloyd Triestino, Trieste. Captured during Operation Postmaster on 14 January 1942 by the SOE and Royal Navy off Fernando Po, Spanish Guinea and reflagged to the United Kingdom. Caught fire on 13 July 1942 at Greenock and sank. Refloated on 22 July 1942 and repaired. To MoWT and renamed Empire Yukon. Allocated in 1946 to the Canadian Government. Sold in 1947 to Petrinovic & Co, London and renamed Petconnie. Sold in 1951 to C.O.C. Società per Azioni, Italy and renamed Liu O. Scrapped in November 1952 at Spezia, Italy.

== Suffix beginning with Z ==
=== Empire Zeal ===
Empire Zeal was a 7,009 GRT cargo ship which was built by Lithgows Ltd, Port Glasgow. Launched on 29 December 1941 and completed in March 1942. Torpedoed on 2 November 1942 and sunk by Italian submarine Leonardo da Vinci at 00°30′S 30°45′W.

=== Empire Zephyr ===
Empire Zephyr was a 6,237 GRT cargo ship which was built by C Connell & Co Ltd, Glasgow. Launched on 2 March 1941 and completed in April 1941. Sold in 1946 to Kelston Steamship co Ltd and renamed Valewood. Operated under the management of J I Jacobs & Co Ltd. Sold in 1949 to Ampleforth Steamship Co Ltd and renamed Ampleforth. Operated under the management of C Cravos & Co, Cardiff. Arrived on 12 August 1959 at Port Glasgow for scrapping.

=== Empire Zest ===
Empire Zest was a 316 GRT trawler which was built by Gebroeders Fikkers, Muntendam, Netherlands. Launched in 1918 as Amsterdam. Sold in 1938 to J L de Groot, Netherlands and renamed Zeester. Requisitioned by MoWT in 1940 and renamed Empire Zest. Transferred to the Admiralty in 1957 and reported disposed of in 1962.

=== Empire Zona ===
Empire Zona was a 292 GRT tug which was built by Fleming and Ferguson of Paisley. Launched on 26 October 1945 and completed in February 1946. To the Admiralty in 1946, renamed Resolve in 1959. Sold in 1974 to L Matsas, Greece and renamed Georgios L Matsas.

== Sources ==
- Mitchell, W. H.; Sawyer, L. A. (1990). The Empire Ships (2nd ed.). London, New York, Hamburg, Hong Kong: Lloyd's of London Press. ISBN 1-85044-275-4.
