= SS Salamanca (1943) =

Type cargo ship by J Cockerill SA

History
- Name: Äolus (1943–1945); Empire Witham (1945–1948); Choysang (1948–1961); Milford (1961–1967); Salamanca (1967–1969)
- Owner: Dampfschifffahrts Gesellschaft Neptun (1943–1945); Ministry of War Transport (1945–1946); Ministry of Transport (1946–1948); Indo-China Steam Navigation Co Ltd (1948–1961); Hemisphere Shipping Co (1961–1967); Continental Navigation Co (1967–1969)
- Operator: Dampfschifffahrts Gesellschaft Neptun (1944–1945); Indo-China Steam Navigation Co Ltd (1945–1961); Hemisphere Shipping Co (1961–1967); Continental Navigation Co (1967–1969)
- Port of registry: (Nazi Germany) Bremen, Germany (1945); London, United Kingdom (1945–1948); Hong Kong (1948–1967); Panama City, Panama (1967–1969)
- Builder: John Cockerill SA
- Yard number: 702
- Launched: 21 October 1943
- Completed: May 1944
- Out of service: 1969
- Identification: United Kingdom Official Number 180846 (1945–1967); Code Letters GDQV (1945–1967); Lloyd's Register Number 0523515 ( –1969)
- Fate: Scrapped

General characteristics
- Class & type: Hansa A type Cargo ship
- Tonnage: 1,923 GRT, 935 NRT, 3,070 DWT
- Length: 85.85 m (281 ft 8 in)
- Beam: 13.51 m (44 ft 4 in)
- Depth: 4.80 m (15 ft 9 in)
- Installed power: Compound steam engine, 1,200IHP
- Propulsion: Single screw propeller
- Speed: 10.5 knots (19.4 km/h)

Salamanca was a Hansa A Type cargo ship which was built as Äolus in 1944 by J Cockerill SA, Hoboken, Belgium for Netptun Line, Hamburg . She was seized as a prize of war in 1945, passing to the Ministry of War Transport and renamed Empire Witham. She was sold to Hong Kong in 1948 and was renamed Choysang. A further sale in 1861 saw her renamed Milford. She was sold to Panama in 1967 and was renamed Salamanca. She was scrapped in 1971.

== Description ==
The ship was 85.85 m (281 ft 8 in) long, with a beam of 13.51 m (44 ft 4 in). She had a depth of 4.80 m (15 ft 9 in). She was assessed as 1,925 GRT, 935 NRT, 3,070 DWT.

The ship was propelled by a compound steam engine. Rated at 1,200IHP, it drove a single screw propeller and could propel the ship at 10.5 knots (19.4 km/h).

== History ==
Äolus was a Hansa A Type cargo ship built in 1943 as yard number 702 by J Cockerill SA, Hoboken, Belgium for Dampfschifffahrts Gesellschaft Neptun, Bremen. She was launched on 21 October 1943 and completed in May 1944. Her port of registry was Bremen.

On 22 May May 1945, Äolus was seized as a prize of war at Kiel,. She was passed to the Ministry of War Transport and was renamed Empire Witham. The Code Letters GDQV and United Kingdom Official Number 180846 were allocated. Her port of registry was London and she was operated under the management of the Indo-China Steam Navigation Co. Ltd, Hong Kong.

In 1948, Empire Witham was sold to the Indo-China Steam Navigation Co., Hong Kong and was renamed Choysang. She was sold to Hemisphere Shipping Co., Hong Kong in 1961 and was renamed Milford. With their introduction in the 1960s, Milford was allocated the Lloyd's Register Number 0523515.

In 1967, Milford was sold to the Continental Navigation Co., Panama and was renamed Salamanca. Damaged in August 1967, she arrived at Hong Kong on 22 March 1969 for scrapping by the Lee Sing Co. Salamanca was scrapped in May 1969.
