= Bob Magness =

American businessman (1924–1996)

Bob Magness (June 3, 1924 – November 15, 1996) was an American businessman who founded Tele-Communications, Inc (TCI).

At the time of his death, TCI was the largest cable television provider in the United States, and Forbes Magazine listed Magness as a billionaire and the second-richest businessman in Colorado. Three years after his death, TCI was bought by AT&T Broadband which became Comcast in 2003.
