= Wiking (horse) =

Arabian stallion

- Breed: Arabian
- Discipline: horse racing
- Sire: Etap
- Grandsire: Celebes
- Dam: Wilma
- Maternal grandsire: Pietuszok
- Sex: Stallion
- Foaled: 1979
- Country: foaled in Poland, imported to United States
- Color: Bay
- Owner: Town and Country Farms
- Trainer: Robert Knight

Record
- 37:20-14-5

Earnings
- $97, 782

Honors
- 1985 International Arabian Horse Association Racehorse of the Year

Wiking is the all-time leading sire of Arabian racehorses. Born in Poland in 1979, Wiking was imported to the United States in 1984. He raced 37 times total, 18 in Poland with 8 wins, and then 20 starts in the United States with 12 wins, and earned $97,782 in US dollars. He was owned by Town and Country Farms and trained by Robert Knight.

A bay stallion standing 14.3 hands (59 inches, 150 cm), Wiking sired 498 registered foals. He is in the Arabian Horse Trust Racing Hall of Fame, and was named the 1985 International Arabian Horse Association racehorse of the year.

He is the record holder in terms of the number of offspring that won in the United States.

== Pedigree ==
Pedigree of Wiking
Sire Etap	Celebes	Witraz	Ofir
Sire Etap	Celebes	Witraz	Makata
Sire Etap	Celebes	Canaria	Trypolis
Sire Etap	Celebes	Canaria	Saga
Sire Etap	Etna	Faher	Trypolis
Sire Etap	Etna	Faher	Ferha
Sire Etap	Etna	Elzunia	Witraz
Sire Etap	Etna	Elzunia	Elza
Dam Wilma	Pietuszok	Priboj	Piolun
Dam Wilma	Pietuszok	Priboj	Rissalma
Dam Wilma	Pietuszok	Taktika	Taki Pan
Dam Wilma	Pietuszok	Taktika	Krona
Dam Wilma	Worskla	Laur	Lotnik
Dam Wilma	Worskla	Laur	Kalina
Dam Wilma	Worskla	Wilga	Ofir
Dam Wilma	Worskla	Wilga	Jaskolka II
