= Tele-Communications Inc. =

Defunct American cable television provider

Tele-Communications, Inc.
- Type: Public
- Traded as: NASDAQ: TCOMA
- Industry: Cable television
- Founded: 1968; 58 years ago
- Defunct: 1999; 27 years ago
- Fate: Purchased by AT&T Corporation for broadband Internet services Cable television systems sold to Cablevision, Comcast, Charter Communications, and Cox Communications
- Successor: AT&T Broadband
- Headquarters: Denver, Colorado, U.S.
- Key people: John Malone
- Website: tci.com at the Wayback Machine (archived 1997-07-02)

Tele-Communications, Inc. (TCI) was a cable television provider in the United States, and for most of its history was controlled by Bob Magness and John Malone.

The company was started in 1958 in Bozeman, Montana, as Western Microwave, Inc. and Community Television, Inc., two firms with common ownership. The companies merged in 1968 and operations moved to Denver, taking the name Tele-Communications Inc. It was the largest cable operator in the United States at one time.

After going public in 1970, the company grew rapidly, and became the top cable provider in the United States. After a failed merger attempt with Bell Atlantic in 1994, it was purchased in 1999 by AT&T, whose cable television assets in select markets were later acquired by Charter Communications, Cox Communications, and then Cablevision and Comcast Corporation.

== History ==
After graduating from Southwestern Oklahoma State University, Bob Magness was a cotton seed salesman and cattle rancher. In 1956, he met two men who were stranded and needed a ride. Learning that they wanted to build a community antenna system in Paducah, Texas, he decided to raise the money for a similar system in Memphis, Texas. He sold his cattle, took out a mortgage on his home and borrowed $2,500 from his father. His wife did the office work while Bob put up the wires himself.

Two years later Magness sold the system and was looking for a way to invest the sales proceeds. Another cable pioneer, Bill Daniels, told him about a community antenna system in Bozeman, Montana. The Kearns-Tribune Corp., publisher of The Salt Lake Tribune, which owned a cable system in Reno, Nevada, began relaying signals by common carrier microwave from Salt Lake City in 1956. In 1958 it became a partner with Magness in establishing a partnership for cable TV in Montana. George C. Hatch and Brian Glasmann were also partners in the companies known as Community Television Inc. and Western Microwave Inc. The Magness family moved to Bozeman. Six systems were built, serving a total of 12,000 homes.

In 1962, Magness purchased Collier Electric Company, which had subscribers in Wyoming, Colorado, and Nebraska, bringing the total number of subscribers to 18,000. Magness later moved to Scottsbluff, Nebraska.

Over time, Magness acquired more systems but remained in Bozeman. By 1965, Daniels told him the companies needed to be located in a larger city. Salt Lake City and Denver, Colorado, were both considered. In 1968, the companies moved to Denver and became Tele-Communications Inc.

Tele-Communications Inc. went public in 1970. The company initially traded on the over-the-counter market, until switching to the then-newly established National Association of Securities Dealers Automated Quotation System (NASDAQ). At the time, it was the 10th largest cable company in the United States. By 1972, with 100,000 subscribers, Magness needed someone with more business knowledge to run the operation. He decided on John Malone, president of Jerrold Electronics, a division of General Instrument. Malone took on the bankers who wanted to call in their loans, and effectively saved the company from bankruptcy. Magness made Malone CEO but remained as chairman. By 1982 Malone had made TCI the largest cable company in the United States.

In 1982, Malone hired Peter Barton, who called himself the company's "Jimmy Olsen" because he just did whatever was needed, fresh from Harvard Business School. Barton went on to become president of TCI's Cable Value Network (later QVC) in 1986, and in 1991, president of TCI spinoff Liberty Media. Barton had a playful side and even kept toys in his Liberty Media office, and a gorilla costume to represent his status as "second banana" to Malone. Yet he had a reputation as "a shrewd and sometimes vicious negotiator".

=== Growth through acquisitions ===
In May 1991 United Artists announced a merger deal with their largest shareholder TCI (now Liberty Media) to form the largest cable operator in the US, a deal valued at $142.5m for the 50% not already owned by TCI. TCI and US West announced a joint venture, and in 1992 the joint venture company became Telewest Communications. By June, the deal was approved. A week later on June 8 the deal was finalized with TCI acquiring the remaining 46% of United Artists, to allow full control.

During the autumn of 1993 talks were also held with Flextech (a British television programming provider). Under the original terms of the proposed deal, Flextech would acquire TCI's European programming business in exchange for shares. By January the deal was complete with TCI acquiring 40-60% of Flextech while Flextech acquired 100% of Bravo, 25% of UK Gold, and 31% of UK Living and 25% of the Children's Channel which increased its share in that channel.

In the spring of 1995, TCI purchased Mile-Hi Cablevision, the CATV provider for the cities of Denver, Colorado and Glendale, Colorado. Mile-Hi Cablevision had been in business since 1983; prior to the merger, TCI served only the suburbs around the city and county of Denver. TCI also acquired the cable television assets of Viacom that year.

=== Merger with Liberty Media ===
In Spring 1993, Bell Atlantic began looking at merger partners, including cable companies. TCI and Liberty Media would be acquired for $11.8 billion in stock and assumption of $9.8 billion in debt. And $5 billion in Liberty properties could likely be added to the deal. Numerous regulatory concerns made the deal tricky; regional telephone companies could not offer long distance service or transmit satellite television services such as Discovery Channel. TCI would also have to sell operations in Bell Atlantic territory. As for antitrust concerns, Bell Atlantic argued that competing telephone services could be offered where TCI had cable systems, and video services could compete with TCI. Vice President Al Gore supported the idea of improving the nation's infrastructure, and the business community took his statement to mean administration approval of the merger.

The $33 billion deal, based on a $54 per share price for Bell Atlantic stock, would have been the largest in American telecommunications history, the resulting company serving one in four cable TV customers. But it fell apart for many reasons, including declining stock prices for both companies. Malone, who would have made over $1 billion, wanted more shares of Bell Atlantic when its price dropped below $54, which Ray Smith refused to do because it would lessen the value of existing shares. The two companies also had different cultures. Bell Atlantic paid dividends and was used to being regulated, while TCI tended to invest in the business rather than pay dividends. And thus ended a $20 billion project to expand the information superhighway, though other mergers promised to put the project back on track, with a more local emphasis rather than attempting a nationwide system upgrade.

The Bell Atlantic deal also fell victim to new federal regulations that reduced cable bills up to 16 percent, costing TCI $300 million over two years. Higher spending coupled with lower cash receipts made TCI less attractive to investors, and the stock price dropped to $17 a share, half what experts believed the company was worth. Bill Nygren of Harris Associates, known for profiting from TCI's Liberty Media, said TCI could make a comeback, and Michael Mahoney of GT Capital expected the proposed deregulation of the cable and telephone industries to increase cable company revenues. Both expected TCI to benefit, especially since TCI owned 30 percent of a joint venture that included Sprint and 10 cable companies with the ability to serve 40 percent of American homes. Cable and phone companies could both offer each other's services, benefiting both companies and customers with product bundling. TCI had plans to upgrade to digital cable and offer more channels and services. Satellite TV providers would be competing to offer digital service, but TCI owned a share of Primestar, and predicted a 28 percent share of the satellite market by the end of 1995.

In late 1995, Time Warner agreed to exchange $8 billion in stock for 82 percent of Turner Broadcasting System. TCI would trade its 21 percent interest in Turner for the third largest stake in Time Warner, or 9 percent. Since the resulting companies would have 40 percent of cable households, enough to cause anti-trust concern, TCI agreed to let Time Warner's Gerald Levin represent TCI. This did not satisfy federal regulators. Malone ended the 15 percent discount on Turner programming that would have lasted 20 years, and Time Warner had to pay $67 million to cover TCI's taxes due.

Magness died in November 1996, with a 26 percent share of the company. No one believed this meant the end of Malone's tenure as head of TCI, even though Malone called Magness his "mentor" and "father figure". Still, TCI had $15 billion in debt and negative cash flow of $400 million for 1996. Malone believed he could turn the company around. This meant higher rates for customers as well as programmers. Malone even succeeded in getting Fox News Channel to pay $200 million for his companies to add the network. At the same time, cost cutting had to take place, and many of the cable customers were in rural areas with old equipment and limited offerings. Upgrading to fiber optic service, which could be used for Internet and telephone service, would be cost-effective only in urban areas. Satellite TV, while not a major threat yet, represented a possible problem in the future. The good news: satellite companies could not offer local channels or phone service, and individual dishes served only one TV.

The new technologies had two benefits for TCI. First, customers would need set-top boxes, which TCI already had ordered from General Instrument. Another advantage was technology developed by a new company called Imedia which would allow four times as many channels to be delivered using existing technology, even in areas not getting fiber-optic service.

On the other hand, digital service had its disadvantages. Customers who did not even want a box would still lose channels so that digital channels could be added. And General Instrument only reluctantly agreed to allow multiple suppliers to bring TCI's costs down.

In 1997 TCI sold ten of its cable systems in NJ and NY to Cablevision.

TCI improved its fortunes, hiring Leo Hindery as president and making Malone chairman and CEO. Still, it was regarded as a company likely to be taken over. TCI was acquired by AT&T in 1999 and in 2002, Comcast acquired the rest of TCI's cable television systems.

=== Final years ===
In 1997 TCI merged with the Kearns-Tribune Corp., publisher of The Salt Lake Tribune, Utah's largest newspaper. Kearns-Tribune Corp. was a large holder of TCI stock.

On June 24, 1998, AT&T, the nation's largest provider of telephone service, announced a plan to buy TCI, second to Time Warner among cable operators with 13 million customers, for $32 billion in stock and $16 billion in assumed debt. This marked the first major merger between phone and cable since deregulation. The new company, to be called AT&T Consumer Services, planned to "significantly accelerate" efforts to offer digital telephone, data and video services as the companies combined the long distance, wireless and dial-up Internet service of AT&T with the cable, high-speed Internet and telecommunications services of TCI. For the first time, AT&T would be able to offer local telephone service. To do this, the company could have bought a Baby Bell such as SBC Communications (which purchased AT&T in 2005 and took the AT&T name), but this would have meant regulatory problems. Liberty Media stockholders would receive separate tracking stock.

Federal regulators and the two companies' shareholders approved the merger February 17, 1999. By that time, the value of the stock portion of the deal had increased to $43.5 billion. The Federal Communications Commission did not require TCI to give other companies access to its cable lines, despite requests by America Online and others. TCI had made its cable lines capable of providing Internet access, and AT&T wanted those same lines to provide local phone service, which it was already doing in another agreement with Time Warner.

AT&T completed its acquisition on March 9, 1999, and TCI became AT&T Broadband and Internet Services, the company's largest unit, with Hindery its chief executive. Malone moved over to Liberty Media, which remained a separate stock and included newer TCI businesses under the heading of TCI Ventures.

== See also ==
- The @Home Network, and Excite webportal
- AT&T Broadband
- MediaOne
