= West Mead =

West Mead may refer to:

- West Mead Township, Pennsylvania, a township in the United States
- USS West Mead (ID-3550), also Westmead, a United States Navy cargo ship in commission from 1918 to 1919

See also

- Westmead (disambiguation)
- Westmeath (disambiguation)
