= List of Empire ships (N) =

== Suffix beginning with N ==
=== Empire Nairn ===
Empire Nairn was a 1,923 GRT cargo ship which was built by Flensburger Schiff-Gesellschaft, Flensburg. Launched in 1944 as Pagenturm for DDG Hansa, Bremen. Seized as a war prize in an uncompleted state at Flensburg. To MoWT and renamed Empire Nairn. Sold in 1947 to Straits Steamship Co Ltd, Singapore and renamed Kamuning. Sold in 1956 to Scindia Steam Navigation Co Ltd, India and renamed Jalatarang. Scrapped in June 1964 in Bombay, India.

=== Empire Nairobi ===
Empire Nairobi was a 7,290 GRT cargo ship which was built by Short Brothers Ltd, Sunderland. Launched on 12 February 1945 and completed in April 1945. Sold in 1946 to Dover Hill Steamship Co Ltd and renamed Dover Hill. Operated under the management of Counties Ship Management Co Ltd. Sold in 1951 to Compagnia Navigazione Castellana SA, Panama and renamed Basil. Sold in 1954 to British Steamship Co Ltd and renamed Ravenshoe. Operated under the management of John Cory & Sons Ltd, Newport Monmouthshire. Sold in 1960 to Plate Shipping Co SA, Panama and renamed Plate Shipper. Operated under the management of P B Pandelis Ltd, London, flying the Greek flag. Sold in 1961 to Sadikoglu, Riza ve Aslan, Turkey and renamed Umran. Sold in 1966 to L Yelkenci Evatlari Donatina, Turkey and renamed Tan 2. Arrived on 7 September 1968 at Istanbul, Turkey for scrapping.

=== Empire Nan ===
Empire Nan was a 258 GRT tug which was built by Scott & Sons Ltd, Bowling, West Dunbartonshire. Launched on 26 September 1945 and completed in December 1945. Sold in 1946 to Metal Industries Ltd and renamed Metinda II. Sold in 1950 to Tees Towing Co Ltd and renamed Banbury Cross. Sold in 1955 to Adelaide Steamship Company, Fremantle, Western Australia and renamed Wilga. Sold in 1973 to Prioper Shipping Co Ltd, Fremantle. Sold in 1975 to Straits Engineers Ltd, Singapore, rebuilt with a new diesel engine. Sold in 1976 to World Dredging Ltd, Panama.

=== Empire Naseby ===
Empire Naseby was an 8,187 GRT tanker which was built by Sir J Laing & Sons Ltd, Sunderland. Launched on 22 October 1945 and complete in May 1946. To Royal Fleet Auxiliary in January 1947 and renamed Wave Knight. Scrapped in December 1964 in Willebroek, Belgium.

=== Empire Neath ===
Empire Neath was a 2,150 GRT cargo ship which was built by Neptun AG, Rostock. Launched in 1935 as Catania for R M Sloman Jr, Hamburg. Seized in May 1945 at Aarhus, Denmark. To MoWT and renamed Empire Neath. Allocated in 1946 to USSR and renamed Meridian. Renamed Equator in 1947 and converted in 1949 to a Merchant Marine training ship. In 1982 she was moored at Otrada, Bay of Odessa as a non-seagoing vessel.

=== Empire Ned ===
Empire Ned was a 235 GRT tug which was built by A Hall & Co Ltd, Aberdeen. Launched on 27 August 1942 and completed in November 1942. Renamed Empire Edward in 1945. To the Admiralty in 1947 and renamed Energetic in 1956. Sold in 1965 to Tsavliris Salvage & Towage Ltd, Greece and renamed Nisos Lefkos. Sold in 1975 to Maritime Commercial Enterprises Ltd, Greece and renamed Kronos. Struck on 23 March 1978 by cruise ship Romanza while berthed at Piraeus, Greece. Declared a constructive total loss and scrapped in March 1979 at Perama, Greece.

=== Empire Nene ===
Empire Nene was a 6,113 GRT cargo ship which was built by Lübecker Flenderwerke AG, Lübeck. Laid down as Schwarzwald for Hamburg America Line. Seized in May 1945 on stocks at Lübeck. Completed in August 1947 as Empire Nene for MoWT. Sold in 1954 to Mariblanca Navigazione SA, Liberia and renamed Mariposa. Sold in 1956 to DDG Hansa, Bremen and renamed Rotenfels. Rebuilt at Bremerhaven. Fitted with a new diesel engine in 1961. Scrapped in August 1977 at Karachi, Pakistan.

=== Empire Neptune ===
Empire Neptune was an 8,285 GRT tanker which was built by R & W Hawthorn Leslie and Co Ltd, Newcastle-upon-Tyne. Launched on 13 April 1945 and completed in August 1945. Sold in 1946 to Eagle Oil and Shipping Company Ltd. and renamed San Virgilio. Arrived on 3 December 1958 at Hong Kong for scrapping.

=== Empire Nerissa ===
Empire Nerissa was a 7,076 GRT cargo ship which was built by Harland & Wolf Ltd, Glasgow. Launched on 23 December 1942 and completed in February 1943. Sold in 1947 to Claymore Shipping Co Ltd, Cardiff and renamed Daydawn. Sold in 1954 to Maclay & McIntyre Ltd, Glasgow and renamed Loch Don. Sold in 1959 to Kvarnerska Plovidba and renamed Kraljevica. Sold in 1961 to Jugoslavenska Linijska Plovidba. Arrived on 24 June 1966 at Split, Yugoslavia for scrapping.

=== Empire Ness ===
Empire Ness was a 2,922 GRT ore carrier which was built by Lithgows Ltd, Port Glasgow. Launched on 17 March 1941 and completed in May 1941. Collided on 30 November 1944 with Liberty Ship William Paca off Terneuzen, Netherlands and sank, total loss.

=== Empire Netta ===
Empire Netta was a 290 GRT tug which was built in 1945 by Fleming and Ferguson Ltd, Paisley. Transferred to the Admiralty in 1949, scrapped in 1969 at Burcht, Belgium.

=== Empire Newcomen ===
Empire Newcomen was a 2,840 GRT cargo ship which was built by William Gray & Co Ltd, West Hartlepool. Launched on 6 September 1941 and completed in November 1941. Torpedoed on 30 November 1941 and sunk by German E-Boats 5 nautical miles (9.3 km) south of the Dudgeon Light, off Cromer, Norfolk.

=== Empire Newfoundland ===
Empire Newfoundland was a 3,539 GRT cargo ship which was built by William Gray & Co Ltd, West Hartlepool. Launched on 6 July 1944 and completed in September 1944. Sold in 1949 to F T Everard & Sons Ltd and renamed Ethel Everard. Sold in 1954 to Indo-China Steam Navigation Co Ltd, London and renamed Hinsang. Sold in 1964 to Kinabatangan Shipping Co Ltd and renamed Kowloon. To Concordia Kinabatangan Shipping Co Ltd, Panama in 1969 and renamed Horis. On 25 December 1969, she suffered damage to her No 1 hold in heavy weather. Repaired at Surabaya, Indonesia. On 28 December 1969, she sprang a leak. This worsened the next day and her pumps were unable to cope. Ship was abandoned, then capsized and sank in the Celebes Sea 200 nautical miles (370 km) from Tawau, Sabah (03°53′N 119°23′E).

=== Empire Newt ===
Empire Newt was a 1,548 GRT tanker which was built by Chicago Shipbuilding Company, Chicago. Completed in 1903 as cargo ship John Crerar. Sold in 1918 to Chemins de Fer Francais, France and renamed Fouras. Sold in 1922 to Glen Steamships, Montreal and renamed Glengarnock. Sold in 1926 to Canada Steamship Lines Inc., Montreal and renamed Courtwright. Sold in 1940 to Branch Lines, Montreal, converted to a tanker and renamed Cedarbranch. To MoWT in 1945 and renamed Empire Newt. Scrapped in July 1946 at Inverkeithing, Fife.

=== Empire Newton ===
Empire Newton was a 7,037 GRT cargo ship which was built by Short Brothers Ltd, Sunderland. Launched on 21 October 1941 and completed in January 1942. Sold in 1946 to Charente Steamship Co Ltd and renamed Artisan. Operated under the management of T & J Harrison Ltd. Arrived on 21 August 1959 at Thos. W. Ward Grays, Essex for scrapping.

=== Empire Nicholas ===
Empire Nicholas was a 257 GRT tug which was built by John Crown & Sons Ltd, Sunderland. Launched on 8 May 1944 and completed in June 1944. Sold in 1947 to Nederlands-Indonesie Steenkolen Handel Maatschappij and renamed Asta. Sold in 1957 to the Government of Indonesia. To Tanjung Priok Port Authority, Tanjung Priok, Indonesia in 1961 and renamed Laut Arafura.

=== Empire Nickleby ===
Empire Nickleby was a 306 GRT coastal tanker which was built by I Pimblott & Sons Ltd, Northwich. Launched on 17 July 1945 and completed in December 1945. Sold in 1946 to Compagnia de Navigazione Anne SA, Panama and renamed Nickleby. Operated under the management of Tankers Transit & Shipping Co, London. Sold in 1950 to Bombay Port Trust for use as a water tanker.

=== Empire Nidd ===
Empire Nidd was a 4,742 GRT cargo ship which was built by Danziger Werft AG, Danzig. Laid down in 1939 as Łódź for a Polish company. Seized by Germany, hull towed to Helsingborg and completed in 1943 as Minden for Norddeutscher Lloyd. Seized in May 1945 at Nyborg, Denmark. To MoWT and renamed Empire Nidd. Allocated to USSR in 1946 and renamed Denis Davydov. Sold in 1947 to Gdynia Americal Line, Poland and renamed General Walter. Scrapped in November 1970 in Hong Kong.

=== Empire Nigel ===
Empire Nigel was a 7,067 GRT cargo ship which was built by William Gray & Co Ltd, West Hartlepool. Launched on 20 July 1943 and completed in September 1943. To USSR in 1944 under Lend-Lease and renamed Archangel then Archangelsk. To Ministry of Transport (MoT) in 1946 and renamed Empire Nigel. Sold in 1947 to W & R Carpenter & Co, Suva, Fiji and renamed Nandi. Sold in 1948 to Bristol City Line of Steamships Ltd and renamed Bristol City. Sold in 1957 to Splonsa Plovba, Yugoslavia and renamed Zelengora. Sold in 1971 to Compagnia de Navigazione Portland SA, Panama and renamed Taras. Arrived on 6 July 1972 at Split, Yugoslavia for scrapping.

=== Empire Niger ===
Empire Niger was a 7,487 GRT cargo ship built by Joh. C. Tecklenborg AG, Wesermünde. Completed in 1920 as Frauenfels for DDG Hansa, Bremen. On 4 April 1941 she was set on fire and scuttled at Massawa, Italian Somaliland. Later salvaged by the Royal Navy, to MoWT in 1942 and renamed Empire Niger. Sold in 1948 to Oceanic Navigation Co Ltd, Calcutta and renamed Belapur. Sold in 1951 to Pang Kwok Sui, Hong Kong. Arrived in June 1954 at Yokohama, Japan for scrapping. Sold in 1955 to Keyston Shipping Co, Hong Kong and renamed Snowdon Hill. Sold in 1957 to Canadian Fir Steamship Co, Hong Kong and renamed Canadian Fir. Sold in 1958 to the Chinese Government and renamed Nan Hai 141. Scrapped in December 1963 in Hong Kong.

=== Empire Nightingale ===
Empire Nightingale was a 5,698 GRT cargo ship which was built by the Ames Shipbuilding and Drydock Company, Seattle. Ordered by Compagnie Générale Transatlantique, France. Completed in September 1919 as Westport for the United States Shipping Board (USSB). To MoWT in 1941 and renamed Empire Nightingale. Sold in 1946 to Williamson & Co Ltd, Hong Kong and renamed Inchmull. Sold in 1948 to Scindia Steam Navigation Co Ltd and renamed Jalamatsya. Sold in 1953 to Richard Nathan Corp, New York and renamed Ricnat. Scrapped in 1953 at Bo'ness, West Lothian.

=== Empire Nile ===
Empire Nile was a 6,318 GRT cargo ship which was built by AG Weser, Bremen. Completed in 1922 as Liebenfels for DDG Hansa, Bremen. On 4 April 1941 she was set on fire and scuttled at Massawa, Italian Eritrea. Later salvaged by Edward Ellsberg, an American Naval officer in charge of salvaging ships and facilities at Massawa, in 1942 and renamed Empire Nile. Sold in 1947 to Oceanic Navigation Co, Calcutta and renamed Alipur. Sold in 1948 to Dah Loh Navigation Co, China and renamed Dah Kiang. Sold in 1951 to Great China Steamship & Industrial Co, Panama and renamed El Grande, the sold later that year to the Chinese Government and renamed Ho Ping I. Renamed Shen Li in 1967. Name removed from shipping registers in 1977 and reported to have been scrapped in China but she was sighted in Shanghai in 1979 named Zhan Dou 75 and old name of Sheng Li visible.

=== Empire Nina ===
Empire Nina was a 292 GRT tug which was built by Cochrane & Sons Ltd, Selby. Launched on 12 June 1945 and completed in February 1946. Sold in 1947 to United Towing Co Ltd and renamed Guardsman. New steam engine from Empire George fitted that year. Scrapped in November 1967 at Blyth, Northumberland.

=== Empire Noble ===
Empire Noble was a 7,125 GRT cargo ship which was built by Vickers-Armstrongs Ltd, Barrow in Furness. Launched on 13 November 1943 and completed in January 1944. Sold in 1946 to W H Seager & Co Ltd, Cardiff and renamed Amicus. Sold in 1963 to Southland Navigation & Commerce Ltd, Hong Kong and renamed Leela. Sold in 1964 to Fir Line Ltd and renamed Pacific Fir. Operated under the management of Ta Hing Co (Hong Kong) Ltd. On 5 February 1968 she sprang a leak approximately 75 nautical miles (139 km) east of Tai Tung, Taiwan (22°37′N 121°42′E). She was abandoned the next day and found adrift. Towed to Koto Soh and beached but broke in two. The bow section sank and the ship declared a total loss.

=== Empire Nomad ===
Empire Nomad was a 7,167 GRT cargo ship which was built by J L Thompson & Sons Ltd, Sunderland. Launched on 16 December 1941 and completed in February 1942. Torpedoed on 13 October 1942 and sunk by U-159 at 37°50′S 18°16′E.

=== Empire Nora ===
Empire Nora was a 292 GRT tug which was built by William Simons & Co Ltd, Renfrew. Launched on 15 August 1945 and completed in September 1946. Sold in 1946 to the Nigerian Government and renamed Barman. Sold in 1967 to Tsavliris Salvage & Towage Ltd, Greece and renamed Nisos Aegina. Scrapped in April 1970 in Piraeus, Greece.

=== Empire Nordic ===
Empire Nordic was a 4,800 GRT LST (3) which was built by Blyth Drydock & Shipbuilding Co Ltd. Launched in June 1945 as LST 3026. To Royal Navy in 1946 as HMS Charger. To MoT in 1955, converted to a ferry. Operated under the management of Frank Bustard & Sons Ltd. Withdrawn from service in the winter of 1966–67. Sold in 1968 to German shipbreakers, then resold to Spanish shipbreakers. Arrived on 10 October 1968, under tow at Bilbao, Spain for scrapping.

=== Empire Norse ===
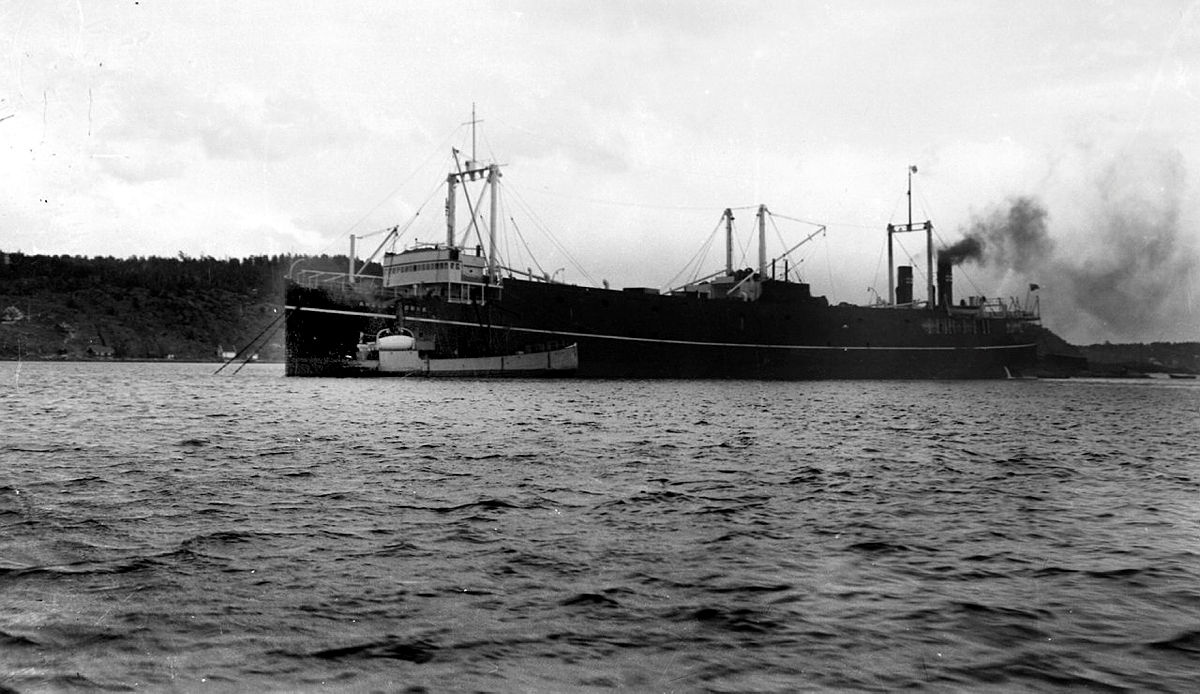
The ship as Anglo-Norse

Empire Norse was an 8,120 GRT tanker which was built by Palmers Shipbuilding and Iron Co Ltd, Hebburn. Completed in 1914 as Maricopa. Sold in 1929 to Falkland Shipowners Ltd, London and renamed Anglo-Norse. On 19 August 1941 she was in a collision with SS Lanark and put into the River Tyne with damage to her hull. On 31 August 1941 she caught fire while being repaired. Her cargo included ammunition that exploded, so she was scuttled. Raised on 3 September. To MoWT, repaired and renamed Empire Norse. To Falkland Shipowners Ltd, London and reverted to Anglo-Norse name in 1946. Sold in 1956 to Anders Jahre & Co, Norway and renamed Janina. On 15 January 1957 she caught fire north-west of Lisbon (41°33′N 09°33′W). She was abandoned and sank on 18 January.

=== Empire Norseman (I) ===
Empire Norseman was an 8,214 GRT Landing Ship, Gantry and tanker that was built by Harland & Wolff Ltd, Belfast. She was launched on 21 October 1941 and completed in April 1942 as RFA Dinsdale. The Italian submarine Comandante Cappellini torpedoed and sank her on 31 May 1942 northeast of Pernambuco, Brazil (00°45′S 29°50′W) while on her maiden voyage.

=== Empire Norseman (II) ===
Empire Norseman was a 9,811 GRT tanker that was launched in 1942 by the Furness Shipbuilding Co, Middlesbrough. The Ministry of War Transport placed her under the management of the Eagle Oil and Shipping Company. The German submarines U-202 and U-558 torpedoed and sank her off the Azores (31°15′S 27°22′W) on 23 February 1943.

=== Empire Northfleet ===
Empire Northfleet was a 7,311 GRT cargo ship which was built by William Doxford & Sons Ltd, Sunderland. Launched on 16 July 1945 and completed in January 1946. Sold in 1946 to Stephens, Sutton Ltd and renamed Chulmleigh. Renamed Rugeley in 1961. Sold in 1964 to Union Fair Shipping Co, Liberia and renamed Madura. Ran aground in a Typhoon Viola at Hong Kong. Refloated on 10 July but declared a constructive total loss. Scrapped in August 1964 in Hong Kong.

=== Empire Nugget ===
Empire Nugget was a 9,807 GRT tanker which was built by Furness Shipbuilding Co Ltd, Haverton Hill-on-Tees. Launched on 28 September 1942 and completed in November 1942. Sold in 1946 to Adellen Shipping Co Ltd and renamed Adellen. Operated under the management of B L Shipping Co Inc, London. Scrapped in November 1961 at Sakai, Japan.

=== Empire Nutfield ===
Empire Nutfield was a 1,561 GRT cargo ship which was built by Dublin Dockyard Co Ltd., Dublin. Completed in 1919 as Bermondsey. Sold in 1928 to E T Lindley, London. On 4 December 1942, she was in collision with MV Bornholm and beached at South Shields severely damaged. Refloated on 22 December 1942 and towed to the River Tyne. Declared a constructive total loss but repaired. To MoWT in 1943 and renamed Empire Nutfield. Scuttled on 3 September 1946 with a cargo of obsolete chemical warfare ammunition at 48°03′N 08°09′W.

== See also ==
The above entries give a precis of each ship's history. For a fuller account see the linked articles.

== Sources ==
- Mitchell, WH; Sawyer, LA (1990). The Empire Ships (Second ed.). London, New York, Hamburg, Hong Kong: Lloyd's of London Press Ltd. ISBN 1-85044-275-4.
