= SS Inchmull =

A number of steamships were named Inchmull, including

- SS Inchmull (1918), a Hong Kong cargo ship in service 1946–48.
- SS Inchmull (1919), a Hong Kong cargo ship in service 1949–53.
- SS Inchmull (1941), a Hong Kong cargo ship in service 1953–69
