= SS Willhilo =

A number of ships operated by the Williams Steamship Co Inc were named Willhilo

- SS Willhilo (1919), 5,775 GRT, built by Ames Shipbuilding & Dry Dock
- SS Willhilo (1920), 5,815 GRT, built by Sun Shipbuilding Co
