= Westmead =

Westmead may refer to:

- Westmead, New South Wales, a suburb of Sydney

- Westmead Hospital, a major hospital in Sydney
- Westmead railway station, a railway station serving the suburb

- USS Westmead (ID-3550), also spelled USS West Mead (ID-3550), a United States Navy cargo ship in commission from 1918 to 1919

== See also ==
- West Mead (disambiguation)
