= ST Empire Jean =

Empire Jean was the name of two tugs built by Clelands (Successors) Ltd, Willington Quay-on-Tyne, England.

- ST Empire Jean (I), launched in October 1944
- ST Empire Jean (II), launched in December 1944
