= Tradesperson (disambiguation) =

Tradesperson is a skilled worker in a particular field.

Tradesperson may also refer to:

- One who trades; a shopkeeper.
- Door-to-door salesman or saleswoman, a person who travels to customers' houses to sell them things
- Salesman or salesperson, a person who works in sales, such as to sell goods in a store
- Delivery person (delivery man), a person who works in delivery, to transport goods to a customer's home
- ST Tradesman, a British tugboat
