= ST Aid =

A number of steam-powered tugs were named Aid, including:

- ST Aid (1914), in service 1914–40
- ST Aid (1944), in service 1947–61
