= Galtee =

Galtee may refer to:

- Galtee Mountains, a mountain range in Ireland
- Galtee, a former name of the cargo ship Empire Jonquil
