= SS Empire Chamois =

World War II merchant ship of the United Kingdom

History
- Name: USS West Mount (1918–19); SS Westmount (1919–27); SS Pacific Redwood (1927–41); SS Empire Chamois (1941–47); SS Granview (1947–49); SS Chamois (1949–58)
- Owner: United States Navy (1918–19); United States Shipping Board (1919–27); Dimon Steamship Corp (1927–32); United States Shipping Board (1932–37); United States Maritime Commission (1937–40); Ministry of Shipping (1940–41); Ministry of War Transport (1941–45); Ministry of Transport (1945–47); Astral Shipping Co (1947–49); Compagnia Maritime del Este (1949–58)
- Operator: Naval Overseas Transportation Service (1918–19); United States Shipping Board (1919–27); Dimon Steamship Corp (1927–32); United States Shipping Board (1932–41); Booth Steamship Co Ltd (1941–46); Goulandris Bros Ltd (1947–58)
- Port of registry: United States Navy (1918–19); (United States) New York (1919–41); (United Kingdom) London (1941–46); (United Kingdom) Liverpool (1946–49); Panama (1949–58)
- Builder: Ames Shipbuilding & Drydock Co
- Yard number: 6
- Launched: 16 April 1918
- Completed: May 1918
- Commissioned: 21 May 1918
- Decommissioned: 31 May 1919
- Identification: Pennant Number ID-3202 (1918–19); Code Letters LKRM (1919–35); Code Letters KJUD (1935–41); Code Letters GPJL (1941–46); United States Official Number 216333 (1919–41); United Kingdom Official Number 168200 (1941–49)
- Fate: Scrapped 1958

General characteristics
- Tonnage: 5,684 GRT; 3,558 NRT
- Displacement: 12,175 Tons (USS West Mount)
- Length: 423 ft 9 in (129.16 m) overall, 409 ft 5 in (124.79 m) between perpendiculars
- Beam: 54 ft 2 in (16.51 m)
- Draught: 23 feet 11 3/4 inches (7.309 m)
- Depth: 27 ft 4 in (8.33 m)
- Installed power: Triple expansion steam engine
- Propulsion: Screw propeller
- Speed: 9.5 knots (17.6 km/h)
- Crew: 75 (USS West Mount)
- Armament: 1 x 3" gun (USS West Mount)

SS Empire Chamois was a 5,864 GRT cargo ship which was built in 1918 by Ames Shipbuilding and Drydock Co, Seattle. She was ordered by the Compagnie Générale Transatlantique but was requisitioned by the United States Navy and commissioned as USS West Mount with the pennant number ID-3202 in 1918. She was decommissioned in May 1919 and passed to the United States Shipping Board (USSB) as SS Westmount. In 1927, she was sold to the Dimon Steamship Corporation and renamed SS Pacific Redwood. She returned to the USSB in 1932 and passed to the United States Maritime Commission (USMC) in 1937. In 1940, she was passed to the Ministry of Shipping, passing to the Ministry of War Transport in 1941 and being renamed SS Empire Chamois. She was sold to Astral Shipping Co Ltd in 1946 and renamed SS Granview. In 1949, she was sold to the Compagnia Maritime del Este, Panama and renamed SS Chamois, serving until 1958 when she was scrapped. She was the last Ames-built ship afloat.

== Description ==
The ship was built by Ames Shipbuilding and Drydock Co, Seattle, Washington, as yard number 6. She was launched on 16 April 1918, and complete in May 1918.

The ship was 423 feet 9 inches (129.16 m) overall, and 409 feet 5 inches (124.79 m) long between perpendiculars, with a beam of 54 feet 2 inches (16.51 m) and a depth of 27 feet 4 inches (8.33 m). Her draught was 23 feet 11 3/4 inches (7.309 m) She had a GRT of 5,683 and a NRT of 3,557. USS West Mount displaced 12,175 tons. She was armed with a 3" gun.

The ship was propelled by a triple expansion steam engine, which had cylinders of 26 inches (66 cm), 43 inches (110 cm) and 73 inches (190 cm) diameter by 48 inches (120 cm) stroke. It could propel her at 9.5 knots (17.6 km/h).

== History ==
She was originally ordered by the Compagnie Générale Transatlantique, Saint Nazaire, France, but in 1917 she was requisitioned by the United States Navy while under construction. USS West Mount was commissioned on 21 May 1918. Operated by the Naval Overseas Transportation Service, she sailed from Seattle on 23 May with a cargo of flour. She passed through the Panama Canal and arrived at New York on 2 July. After repairs, she departed New York on 13 July and arrived at Bordeaux, France on 19 July. She departed Bordeaux with a cargo of 1,000 tons of iron ore, arriving at New York on 9 October. On 24 October, she departed for Brest, arriving on 8 November. The armistice was signed on 11 November. West Mount departed Brest on 12 December and arrived at New York on 1 January 1919. She loaded a cargo of flour and milk which was consigned to the Food Administration. She departed on 22 January bound for Constantinople (then part of the Ottoman State), via Gibraltar. West Mount departed Constantinople with 2,875 tons of cargo for the USSB. She arrived in Philadelphia, Pennsylvania on 1 May and was decommissioned on 31 May.

The ship was passed to the USSB and renamed Westmount. The United States Official Number 216333 was allocated. In 1927, she was chartered by the Dimon Steamship Corporation, New York and renamed Pacific Redwood. Her Code Letters were LKRM. In 1932, Pacific Redwood was returned to the USSB. In 1935, her Code Letters were changed to KJUD. Pacific Redwood was passed to the United States Maritime Commission in 1937.

In 1940, Pacific Redwood was transferred to the Ministry of Shipping, which became the Ministry of War Transport in 1941. Pacific Redwood was then renamed Empire Chamois. Her port of registry was changed to London. The United Kingdom Official Number 169200 and Code Letters GPJL were allocated. She was placed under the management of the Booth Steamship Co Ltd. Empire Chamois was a member of a number of convoys during the Second World War.

SC 76

Convoy SC 76 departed Halifax, Nova Scotia on 24 March 1942 and arrived at Liverpool on 11 April. Empire Chamois was carrying a cargo of steel bound for Newport, Monmouthshire.

ON 92

Convoy ON 92 departed Liverpool on 6 May 1942 and arrived at Halifax on 21 May. Empire Chamois departed from Milford Haven, Pembrokeshire.

SC173

Convoy SC 173 departed Halifax on 18 April 1945 and arrived at Liverpool on 4 May. Empire Chamois was in collision with HMCS St. Boniface as the convoy was forming up. St. Boniface suffered extensive damage to her bows and was out of action for three months. Empire Chamois returned to port and did not sail with the convoy.

The MoWT became the Ministry of Transport in 1945. In 1946, Empire Chamois's port of registry was changed to Liverpool. On 5 April 1947, Empire Chamois was disabled off Rame Head, Cornwall. She was assisted by HMS Burghead Bay until a tug arrived. Empire Chamois was sold in 1947 to the Astral Shipping Co Ltd. She was renamed Granview and placed under the management of Gouldandris Brothers Ltd, London. In 1949, Granview was sold to the Compagnia Maritime del Este, Panama, remaining under Goulandris's management, but now under the Panamanian Flag and renamed Chamois. She served until 1958 when she was scrapped at Antwerp, Belgium. At the time, she was the last Ames-built ship afloat.
