= Westmeath (disambiguation) =

Westmeath commonly refers to County Westmeath, Ireland.

Westmeath may also refer to:

== County Westmeath, Ireland ==
- Westmeath (Dáil constituency)
- County Westmeath (UK Parliament constituency)
- County Westmeath (Parliament of Ireland constituency)
- Westmeath GAA

== Other ==
- Earl of Westmeath
- SS Westmeath, a British cargo ship built in 1893 and later named Tokomaru
- A community in Whitewater Region, Ontario

== See also ==
- Meath West
