= Ames Shipbuilding and Drydock Company =

Defunct shipyard in Seattle, Washington, U.S.

Coordinates: 47.5756°N 122.3619°W

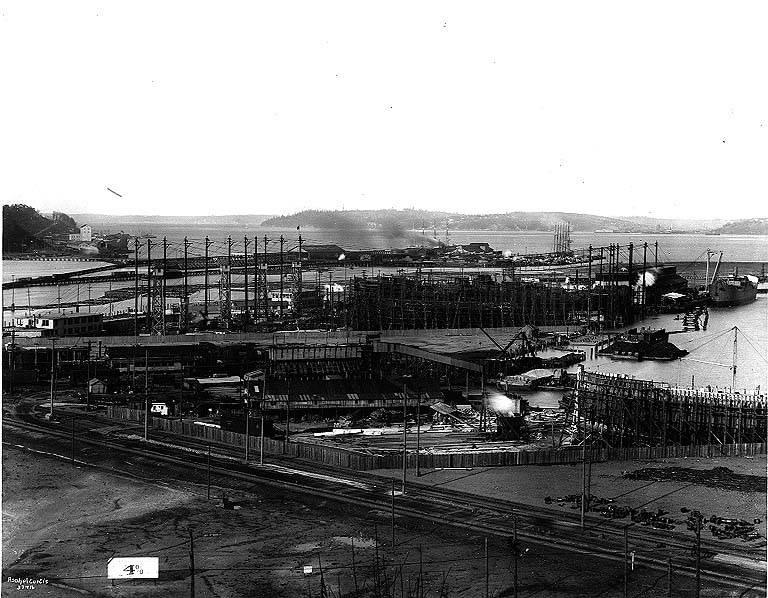
- The shipyard and surrounding development near Harbor Island in 1917
- Industry: Shipbuilding
- Founded: 1916
- Founder: Edgar Ames
- Defunct: c. 1955 (Note: Ames's terminal facilities were sold to the Port of Seattle in 1955. Archives West notes: "City directory entries for the Ames Shipbuilding & Drydock Company end in the 1956, and for the Ames Terminal Company in the early 1960s.")
- Headquarters: Seattle, Washington, U.S.

The Ames Shipbuilding and Drydock Company was a shipbuilding company in Seattle, Washington, United States. Established in 1916, the shipyard produced vessels for the United States Shipping Board during World War I. The Ames Terminal Company was established at the site of the shipyard after the war. It continued operations until 1955, when the terminal facilities were purchased by the Port of Seattle.

== History ==
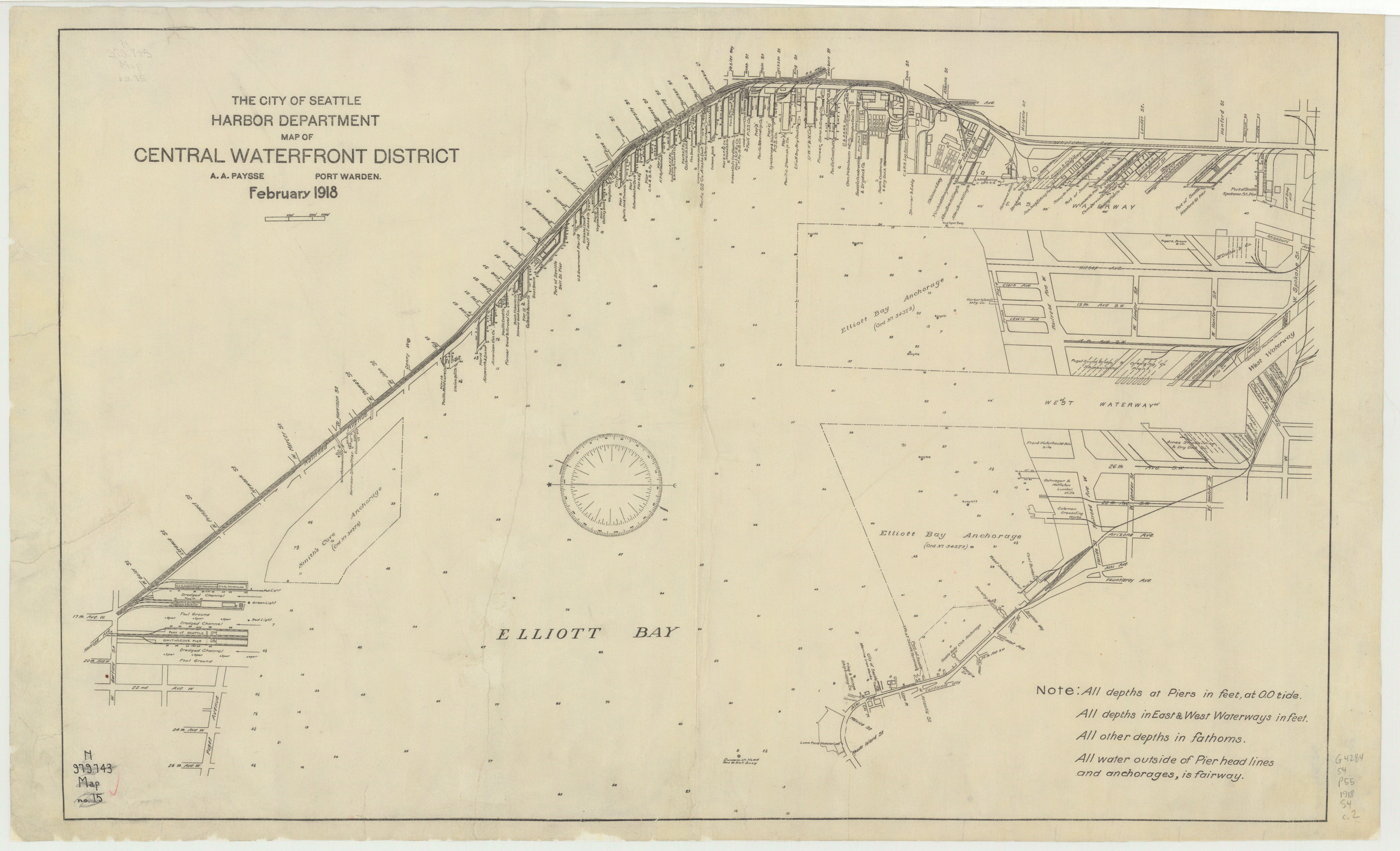
A 1918 map showing the location of the shipyard in Elliott Bay

The Ames Shipbuilding and Drydock Company was established in 1916 by businessman Edgar Ames. Construction of the shipyard began in December 1916, and production of its first vessels began by March 1917. The yard included four shipways and a dry dock, as well as a blacksmith shop, machine shop, boiler shop, and other facilities. It was located on the Duwamish West Waterway across from Harbor Island in Elliott Bay. The yard produced 25 vessels for the United States Shipping Board during World War I, including 23 cargo ships and 2 steel tankers.

Following the end of World War I, unions in Seattle's shipbuilding industry demanded wage increases for their members, who were dissatisfied with wage adjustments that had been imposed during the war. On January 21, 1919, Ames employees participated in a walkout of shipyard workers across the city that precipitated the Seattle General Strike several weeks later. The strike ultimately proved unsuccessful, with the workers eventually returning to their jobs without any increase in pay. (Note: The general strike concluded by February 11, but shipyard workers continued striking until early March.)

In December 1920, the company's facilities and equipment were sold to the Seattle Contract Company, which planned to dismantle the plant; the Ames Shipbuilding and Drydock Company still retained the title to the land. The Ames Terminal Company was incorporated in 1922, with its operations at the site of the former shipyard. The new company handled shipments of salmon for Libby, McNeill & Libby.

The company's terminal facilities were sold to the Port of Seattle in 1955. According to Archives West: "City directory entries for the Ames Shipbuilding & Drydock Company end in the 1956, and for the Ames Terminal Company in the early 1960s." The site of the shipyard is occupied by the Port of Seattle's Terminal 5 as of 2025.

== Notable vessels ==
- Westmount
- Westport
- War Dido
- West Islip

== See also ==
- List of structures on Elliott Bay
