= SS Norjerv =

Cargo ship built in 1919

History
- Name: West Islip (1919–28); Golden Rod (1928–35); Willhilo (1935–37); Indianan (1937–40); Empire Eagle (1940–42); Norjerv (1942–44)
- Owner: United States Shipping Board (1919–28); Oceanic & Oriental Steam Navigation Co (1928-35); American-Hawaiian Steamship Co Inc (1937-40); Ministry of Supply (1940); Ministry of War Transport (1940–42); Norwegian Government (1942–44); British Government (1944)
- Operator: United States Shipping Board (1919–28); Oceanic & Oriental Steam Navigation Co (1928-35); American-Hawaiian Steamship Co (1937-40); Runciman & Co Ltd (1940–42); Nortraship (1942–44)
- Port of registry: Seattle, United States (1919-28); (United States) San Francisco (1928–35); (United States) New York (1935-40); London, United Kingdom (1940-42); Oslo, Norway (1942-44); London, United Kingdom (1944)
- Builder: Ames Shipbuilding & Dry Dock Co
- Launched: 24 June 1919
- In service: October 1919
- Out of service: 16 July 1944
- Identification: United States Official Number 218782 (1919–40); United Kingdom Official Number 167576 (1940-42, 1944); Code Letters LSNC (1928–34); Code Letters KIKX (1937-40); Code Letters GLJC (1940–42); Code Letters LNAJ (1942-44)
- Fate: Sunk as blockship 1944, refloated for scrapping in 1949 sank on voyage to scrapyard.

General characteristics
- Type: Cargo ship
- Tonnage: 5,775 GRT (1919-40); 5,583 GRT (1940-44); 3,572 NRT (1919-49); 3,468 NRT (1940-44); 8,800 DWT
- Length: 409 ft 8 in (124.87 m)
- Beam: 54 ft 2 in (16.51 m)
- Draught: 25 ft 9 in (7.85 m)
- Depth: 29 ft 2 in (8.89 m)
- Installed power: 369 nhp
- Propulsion: Triple expansion steam engine
- Speed: 11.5 knots (21.3 km/h)
- Crew: 37 (Norjerv)
- Armament: 1 × 4-inch or 4.7-inch gun, 1 × 12-pounder gun, 4 × Oerlikon guns. (Norjerv)

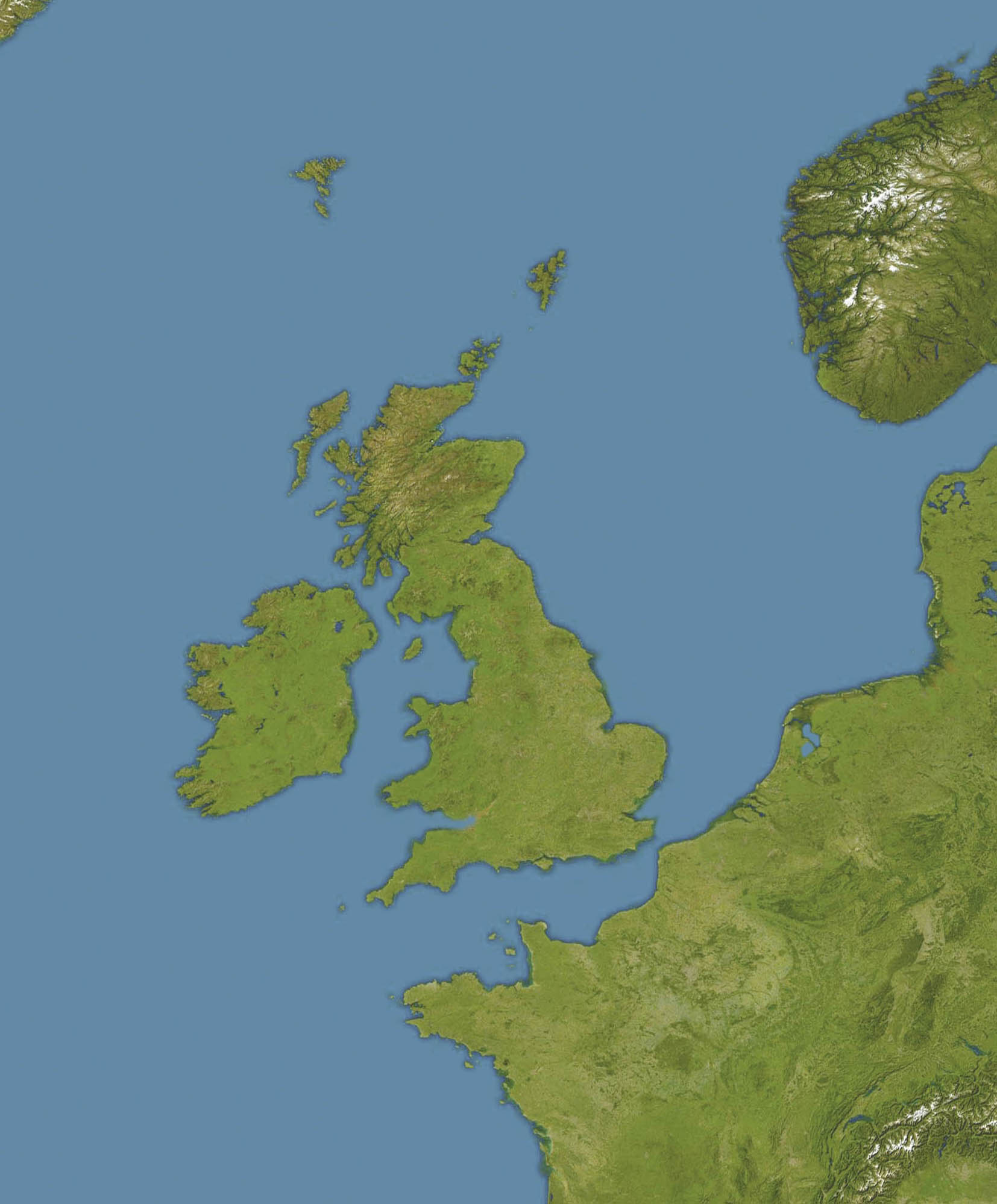
Location where Norjerv was sunk as a blockship.

Norjerv was a 5,583 GRT cargo ship that was built in 1919 as West Islip by Ames Shipbuilding & Dry Dock Co, Seattle, Washington, United States for the United States Shipping Board (USSB). In 1928, she was sold and renamed Golden Rod. A further sale in 1935 saw her renamed Willhilo. She was renamed Indianan after a sale in 1937. In 1940, she was transferred to the Ministry of Supply (MoS) and renamed Empire Eagle, passing later that year to the Ministry of War Transport (MoWT). In 1942, she was transferred to the Norwegian Government and renamed Norjerv, serving until June 1944 when she was transferred to the British Government. In July 1944, she was sunk as a blockship at Juno Beach, Calvados, France to reinforce Gooseberry 4.

== Description ==
The ship was built in 1919 by Ames Shipbuilding & Dry Dock Co, Seattle, Washington. She was yard number 17.

The ship was 409 feet 8 inches (124.87 m) long, with a beam of 54 feet 2 inches (16.51 m). She had a depth of 29 feet 2 inches (8.89 m), and a draught of 26 feet 9 inches (8.15 m). As built, she was assessed at 5,775 GRT, 3,572 NRT.

The ship was propelled by a 369 nhp triple expansion steam engine, which had cylinders of 26 inches (66 cm), 43 inches (110 cm) and 73 inches (190 cm) diameter by 48 inches (120 cm) stroke. The engine was built by Ames. It drove a single screw propeller and could propel the ship at 11.5 knots (21.3 km/h).

== History ==
=== Pre-war ===
West Islip was built in 1919 for the United States Shipping Board. She was launched on 24 June, and the United States Official Number 218782 was allocated. She was in service by October, arriving at Shanghai, China on 20 October from Seattle. In 1928, she was sold to the Oceanic & Oriental Steam Navigation Co, San Francisco, California, and was renamed Golden Rod. The Code Letters LSNC were allocated and her port of registry was San Francisco. On 6 February 1931, Golden Rod ran aground at the mouth of the Fraser River, British Columbia, Canada. She was refloated the next day and sailed to Seattle.

In 1935, Golden Rod was sold to the Williams Steamship Co Inc, New York and renamed Willhilo. In 1937, Willhilo was sold to the American-Hawaiian Steamship Co and was renamed Indianan. The Code Letters KIKX were allocated and her port of registry was New York.

=== World War II ===
In 1940, Indianan was transferred to the MoS. Indianan departed from Cristóbal, Panama on 31 March 1940 for New York, arriving on 10 April. She departed three days later for Baltimore, Maryland, where she arrived on 15 April. She departed five days later for Tampa, Florida, arriving on 26 April and then sailing three days later for Bermuda, where she arrived on 5 May. Indianan was a member of Convoy BHX 41, which departed from Bermuda on 7 May 1940 and joined Convoy HX 41 at sea on 13 May. She was carrying a cargo of phosphates. Convoy HX 41 had departed from Halifax, Nova Scotia, Canada on 8 May and arrived at Liverpool, Lancashire, United Kingdom on 23 May. Indianan was bound for Garston, Liverpool.

Indianan was renamed Empire Eagle. The MoS became the MoWT later that year. The United Kingdom Official Number 167583 and Code Letters GLJC were allocated. She was placed under the management of Runciman (London) Ltd and her port of registry was changed to London. She was assessed as 5,582 GRT, 3,468 NRT. Empire Eagle was a member of Convoy OB 186, which departed from Liverpool on 20 July and dispersed at sea on 22 July. Her destination was Philadelphia, Pennsylvania, where she arrived on 8 August. She departed a week later and sailed to Sydney, Cape Breton, Nova Scotia, where she arrived on 20 August. Empire Eagle departed on 25 August as a member of Convoy SC 2, which arrived at Liverpool on 10 September. She was carrying a cargo of scrap iron and steel, bound for Barrow in Furness, Lancashire, which was reached by detaching from the convoy and sailing to the Clyde, where she arrived on 10 September. She sailed for Barrow-in-Furness two days later, arriving on 15 September.

Empire Eagle departed from Barrow-in-Furness on 28 September and sailed to Liverpool. She then joined Convoy OB 221, which departed on 29 September and dispersed at 59°43′N 20°29′W on 3 October. Empire Eagle put back into Liverpool. She then joined Convoy OB 226, which departed on 9 October and dispersed at sea on 12 October. Empire Eagle was in ballast and bound for Boca Grande, Florida, United States, where she arrived on 30 October. She sailed on 3 November for the Hampton Roads, Virginia, arriving on 8 November and departing three days later for Halifax, where she arrived on 15 November. Empire Eagle was a member of Convoy HX 89, which departed on 17 November and arrived at Liverpool on 1 December. She was carrying a cargo of phosphates bound for London. On 27 November, she straggled behind the convoy due to an engine breakdown. She detached from the convoy and arrived at Stornoway, Outer Hebrides on 1 December, departing the next day to join Convoy WN 47, which had departed from the Clyde on 30 November and arrived at Methil, Fife on 4 December. She departed two days later as a member of Convoy FS 354, which arrived at Southend, Essex on 8 December.

Empire Eagle departed from Southend on 16 January 1941 as a member of Convoy FN 385, which arrived at Methil on 18 January. She then joined Convoy EN 69/1, which departed on 9 February and arrived at Oban, Argyllshire on 13 February. She detached from the convoy and sailed to Loch Ewe, arriving on 13 February, then sailing to New York, where she arrived on 3 March. She departed on 21 March for Halifax, arriving on 24 March. She then joined Convoy HX 117, which departed on 27 March and arrived at Liverpool on 15 April. Empire Eagle was carrying general cargo and steel, bound for London. During the voyage, she made excessive smoke at times, the cause of which was stated to be the low quality of the coal she was burning. She arrived at Loch Ewe on 13 April and then joined Convoy WN 114, which had departed from the Clyde that day and arrived at Methil on 16 April. She then joined Convoy FS 466, which departed on 17 April and arrived at Southend on 19 April.

Empire Eagle departed from Southend on 19 May as a member of Convoy EC 22, which arrived at the Clyde on 24 May. She left the convoy at Methil on 21 May, sailing six days later to join Convoy EC 25, which had departed from Southend on 26 May and arrived at the Clyde on 31 May. She left the convoy at Oban on 30 May, departing two days later to join Convoy OB 329, which had departed from Liverpool on 31 May and dispersed at 51°48′N 20°48′W on 5 June. She was bound for Phildadelphia, where she arrived on 20 September. Having loaded a cargo of steel, Empire Eagle departed on 12 October for Halifax, arriving on 16 October. She was a member of Convoy HX 142, which departed from Halifax on 1 August and arrived at Liverpool on 18 August. She arrived at the Clyde on 17 August.

Empire Eagle departed from the Clyde on 5 September to join Convoy ON 13, which had departed from Liverpool that day and dispersed at sea on 11 September, although she had straggled behind the convoy the previous day. She arrived at Philadelphia on 20 September, departing on 12 October for Halifax, where she arrived on 16 October. Empire Eagle was a member of Convoy HX 162, which departed on 27 November and arrived at Liverpool on 11 December. She was carrying a cargo of steel and vehicles. Empire Eagle returned to Halifax, arriving on 7 December.

Empire Eagle departed from Halifax on 12 March as a member of Convoy SC 74, which arrived at Liverpool on 28 March. She was bound for Hull, Yorkshire. which was reached by detaching from the convoy and sailing to Loch Ewe, arriving on 27 March and joining Convoy WN 263 to Methil, where she arrived on 29 March. She then joined Convoy FS 764, which departed on 30 March and arrived at Southend on 1 April. She arrived at Hull on 31 March.

On 14 April, Empire Eagle was transferred to the Norwegian Government and renamed Norjerv. The Code Letters LNAJ were allocated and her port of registry was changed to Oslo. She was placed under the management of Nortraship. She had a crew of 37, of whom seven were British. On or about 23 April, she joined Convoy FN 688, which had departed from Southend on 22 April and arrived at Methil on 25 April. She then joined Convoy EN 76, which departed that day and arrived at Oban on 27 April. She left the convoy at Loch Ewe that day and sailed to Liverpool, arriving on 28 April. Norjerv then joined Convoy ON 90, which departed that day and arrived at Halifax on 15 May. She departed that day with Convoy XB 20, which arrived at Boston, Massachusetts, on 17 May. Norjerv left the convoy at the Cape Cod Canal and sailed to New York, arriving on 18 May and departing two days later for Philadelphia, where she arrived on 21 May. She departed on 2 June for New York, arriving later that day and then sailing to the Cape Cod Canal, joining Convoy BX 23B, which departed from Boston on 8 June and arrived at Halifax on 10 June. She then joined Convoy HS 13, which departed the next day and arrived at Sydney on 18 June. Norjerv was due to have joined Convoy SC 87, which departed from Sydney on 12 June and arrived at Liverpool on 27 June, but did not arrive at Sydney until after the convoy had sailed. She joined Convoy SC 88, which departed on 19 June and arrived at Liverpool on 4 July. She was carrying a cargo of cotton and steel.

Norjerv was a member of Convoy ON 112, which departed from Liverpool on 13 July and arrived at Cape Cod on 30 July. Her destination was New York, where she arrived on 1 August, sailing later that day for Baltimore, arriving on 4 August. She departed on 20 August for New York, arriving on 26 August and sailing four days later for Cape Cod, from where she joined Convoy BX 36, which departed from Boston on 2 September and arrived at Halifax two days later. Norjerv was a member of Convoy SC 99, which departed on 5 September and arrived at Liverpool on 20 September. She was carrying a cargo of steel. She left the convoy at Loch Ewe on 20 September and joined Convoy WN 339, which sailed the next day and arrived at Methil on 23 September. She then joined Convoy FS916, which departed on 24 September and arrived at Southend two days later. She left the convoy at Hull on 25 September.

Norjerv departed from Hull on 11 October to join Convoy FN 836, which had departed from Southend that day and arrived at Methil two days later. She then joined Convoy EN 150, which departed on 14 October and arrived at Loch Ewe on 17 October. She sailed on to Oban, arriving on 18 October and departing that day to join Convoy ON 140, which departed from Liverpool on 17 October and arrived at New York on 7 November. She departed the next day for Baltimore, where she arrived on 9 November. Norjerv departed on 17 November for Philadelphia, arriving that day and departing on 20 November for New York, where she arrived that day. Laden with general cargo, she then joined Convoy SC 111, which departed on 25 November and arrived at Liverpool on 17 December. She left the convoy and put into Halifax, arriving on 30 November and departing on 6 December to join Convoy SC112, which had departed from New York on 4 December and arrived at Liverpool on 25 December. She left the convoy at Loch Ewe and joined Convoy WN 376, which arrived at Methil on 27 December, sailing three days later with Convoy FS 1000, which arrived at Southend on 2 January 1943.

Laden with a cargo of chalk, Norjerv departed from Southend on 25 January for Loch Ewe, which was reached via convoys FN 927 and EN 190, arriving on 31 January. She then joined Convoy ON 165, which departed from Liverpool on 2 February and arrived at New York on 1 March. Her destination was Philadelphia, where she arrived that day. She departed on 22 March for New York, arriving the next day and departing on 25 February for Boston, arriving the next day. She then joined Convoy BX 39, which departed on 27 March and arrived at Halifax two days later. Norjerv was a member of Convoy SC 125, which departed on 31 March and arrived at Liverpool on 16 April. She left the convoy and put into St. John's Newfoundland, arriving on 6 April. Norjerv departed on 19 April to join Convoy SC 127, which had departed from Halifax on 16 April and arrived at Liverpool on 3 May. She was carrying general cargo, bound for the Clyde, where she arrived that day.

Norjerv departed on 17 May to join Convoy ONS 8, which had departed from Liverpool that day and arrived at Halifax on 1 June. She then joined Convoy XB 56, which arrived at Boston on 3 June. She left the convoy at the Cape Cod Canal and sailed to New York, arriving on 4 June, departing the next day for the Hampton Roads, where she arrived on 7 June. Norjerv departed from the Hampton Roads on 20 June for New York, arriving the next day and departing the day after that for Boston, from where she departed on 30 June as a member of Convoy BX 60. She arrived at Halifax on 2 July. Norjerv was a member of Convoy SC 136, which departed from Halifax on 8 July and arrived at Liverpool on 23 July. She was carrying a cargo of ammunition and steel.

Norjerv was a member of Convoy OS 53 km, which departed from Liverpool on 8 August and separated at sea on 17 August to form convoys OS 53 and KMS 23. The latter convoy arrived at Gibraltar on 18 August. Norjerv was in the part of the convoy that formed OS 53 and arrived at Freetown, Sierra Leone on 27 August. She was carrying a cargo of chemicals bound for Buenos Aires, Argentina. Her armament consisted of a 4-inch or 4.7-inch gun, a 12-pounder gun and four Oerlikon guns. She arrived at Buenos Aires on 12 September, sailing a week later for Montevideo, Uruguay, where she arrived on 20 September. The next day, Norjerv departed for Freetown, arriving on 11 October. She departed on 13 October with Convoy SL 138, which rendezvoused with Convoy MKS 28 on 24 October. That convoy had departed from Gibraltar on 23 October and the combined convoys arrived at Liverpool on 5 November. She was bound for Gibraltar, where she arrived on 25 October. Norjerv then joined Convoy KMS 30, which departed on 31 October and arrived at Port Said, Egypt on 11 November. She left the convoy at Alexandria, on 11 November. She departed on 20 November for Port Said, arriving the next day and then sailing to Suez, from where she departed on 24 November for Aden, arriving on 30 November. Norjerv was a member of Convoy AKD 8, which departed on 3 December and arrived at Durban, South Africa on 19 December. She left the convoy at Lourenço Marques, Mozambique on 16 December.

Norjerv departed from Lourenço Marques on 1 January 1944 for East London, South Africa, arriving three days later and sailing on 5 January for Buenos Aires, where she arrived on 27 January. She sailed on 18 February for Rosario, arriving the next day and departing on 27 February for Buenon Aires, where she arrived the next day. She departed on 4 March for Freetown, arriving on 24 March. Norjerv was a member of Convoy SL 154, which departed on 1 April 1944 and rendezvoused at sea with Convoy MKS 45 on 11 April. MKS 45 had departed from Gibraltar on 10 April. The combined convoys arrived at Liverpool on 23 April. Apart from general cargo, Norjerv was carrying corned beef and wheat.

Norjerv departed from Liverpool on 13 June for Swansea, Glamorgan, arriving two days later. She sailed on 18 June for Barry, arriving later that day. At midnight on 26 June, ownership of Norjerv was transferred to the British Government. She departed on 7 July as a member of Convoy EBC 34, which arrived at the Seine Bay, France on 9 July. On 16 July, Norjerv was sunk to reinforce Gooseberry 4 at Juno Beach, Calvados, France.

=== Post-war ===
Norjerv was raised in 1949 and sold for scrap. On 3 June 1949, she broke in two whilst being towed by the tugs Rifleman and Tradesman to Strangford Lough, County Down, Northern Ireland for scrapping. Both halves of the ship sank.
