= USS West Mead =

Cargo ship of the United States Navy

History

United States
- Name: USS West Mead or Westmead
- Namesake: Previous name retained
- Builder: Ames Shipbuilding and Drydock Company, Seattle, Washington
- Launched: 27 August 1918
- Completed: 1918
- Acquired: late October 1918
- Commissioned: 29 October 1918
- Decommissioned: 9 June 1919
- Stricken: 9 June 1919
- Fate: Transferred to U.S. Shipping Board 9 June 1919
- Notes: Operated commercially as Westmead 1919-1927, Willanglo 1927-1929, San Angela 1927-1940, and Empire Springbuck from 1940; Sunk, 9 September 1941

General characteristics
- Type: Cargo ship
- Tonnage: 5,620 GRT
- Displacement: 12,175 long tons (12,370 t)
- Length: 423 ft 9 in (129.16 m)
- Beam: 54 ft 0 in (16.46 m)
- Draft: 24 ft 11.25 in (7.6010 m) mean
- Depth of hold: 29 ft 9 in (9.07 m)
- Propulsion: 1 × 2,500 ihp (1,900 kW) triple-expansion steam engine, one shaft
- Speed: 10.5 knots (19.4 km/h; 12.1 mph)
- Complement: 113

USS West Mead (ID-3548), also spelled Westmead, was a United States Navy cargo ship in commission from 1918 to 1919.

== Construction, acquisition, and commissioning ==
West Mead was laid down as the commercial steel-hulled, single-screw, coal-burning steam cargo ship SS War Dido for the United States Shipping Board by the Ames Shipbuilding and Drydock Company at Seattle, Washington; her name later was changed to SS West Mead or Westmead and she was completed in 1918. On 26 October 1918, the 13th Naval District inspected West Mead for possible U.S. Navy service during World War I. The Shipping Board transferred her to the U.S. Navy, the Navy assigned her the naval registry identification number 3550, and she was commissioned on 29 October 1918 as USS West Mead or Westmead (ID-3548).

== Operational history ==
Assigned to the Naval Overseas Transportation Service, West Mead loaded 6,865 tons of flour, departed the Pacific Northwest on 15 November 1918 (four days after the Armistice with Germany had brought World War I to an end on 11 November 1918), transited the Panama Canal, and stopped at Balboa in the Panama Canal Zone. She then proceeded from Balboa to New York City, where she arrived on 14 December 1918. She bunkered and underwent repairs at New York.

West Mead departed New York on 24 December 1918 in convoy for the United Kingdom and arrived at Falmouth, England, on 9 January 1919. She moved to Rotterdam in the Netherlands on 24 January 1919 and unloaded her cargo of flour there. She returned to the United States in ballast, arriving at New York City on 3 March 1919.

West Mead next proceeded from New York City to Savannah, Georgia, where she took on board a cargo of cotton and lumber. She departed Savannah on 2 April 1919 bound for the United Kingdom, and reached Liverpool, England, on 21 April 1919. She discharged her cargo there, then returned to Savannah, where she arrived on 7 June 1919.

== Decommissioning and later career ==
West Mead was both decommissioned and stricken from the Navy List on 9 June 1919, and the Navy transferred her back to the U.S. Shipping Board the same day. She then operated commercially as SS Westmead under the ownership of the Shipping Board until she was laid up in the late 1920s.

In 1927, the Shipping Board sold Westmead to the Babcock Steamship Company of New York City, which returned her to service and renamed her SS Willanglo. In 1929, the Pacific-Atlantic Steamship Company of Portland, Oregon, purchased her and renamed her SS San Angela.

In response to the need caused by German submarine activity in the North Atlantic Ocean against Allied convoy routes early in World War II, the British government acquired a number of former U.S. Shipping Board ships under both American private and government ownership; San Angela was among them. She was sold to the British Ministry of War Transport in 1940 and renamed SS Empire Springbuck, and operated under the management of W. A. Souter and Company of Newcastle-upon-Tyne, England.

Empire Springbuck was on the second leg of a voyage from Cuba to Leith, Scotland, via Sydney, Nova Scotia, Canada, when the German submarine U-81 torpedoed and sank her off Cape Farewell, Greenland, on 9 September 1941.

== See also ==
- Liberty ship
- Victory ships
- Park ships
- Type C1 ship
- Type C2 ship
- Type C3 ship
- Murmansk Run
