= USS Westport (ID-3548) =

Cargo ship of the United States Navy

History

United States
- Name: USS Westport (1918–19); SS Westport (1919–41); SS Empire Nightingale (1941–46); SS Inchmull (1946–49); SS Jamlatsya (1949–53); SS Ricnat (1953)
- Namesake: Westport, Connecticut
- Owner: United States Navy (1918–19); United States Shipping Board (1919–41); Ministry of War Transport (1941–45); Ministry of Transport (1945–46); Williamson & Co Ltd (1946–49); Scindia Steam Navigation (1949–53); Richard Nathan Corp (1953)
- Operator: United States Navy (1918–19); United States Shipping Board (1919–41); Mungo, Campbell & Co Ltd (1941–46); Williamson & Co Ltd (1946–49); Scindia Steam Navigation (1949–53); Richard Nathan Corp (1953)
- Port of registry: United States Navy (1918–19); (United States) Seattle (1919–41); London, United Kingdom (1941–46); (British Hong Kong) Hong Kong (1946–53); (United States) New York (1953)
- Builder: Ames Shipbuilding and Drydock Company, Seattle, Washington
- Launched: 12 August 1918
- Completed: 1918
- Acquired: 10 September 1918
- Commissioned: 10 September 1918
- Decommissioned: 31 March 1919
- Stricken: 31 March 1919
- Identification: Pennant Number ID-3548 (1918–19); United States Official Number (1919–41, 1953); United Kingdom Official Number 168191 (1941–46); Code Letters LMVF (1919–34); Code Letters KLCZ (1934–41); Code Letters GNDS (1941–46)
- Fate: Scrapped

General characteristics
- Type: Cargo ship
- Tonnage: 5,665 GRT; 3,529 NRT; 12,175 DWT
- Length: 423 ft 9 in (129.16 m)
- Beam: 54 ft 0 in (16.46 m)
- Draft: 24 ft 11¼ in (7.60 m) (mean)
- Depth of hold: 27 ft 4 in (8.33 m)
- Propulsion: Steam engine, one shaft
- Speed: 10.0 knots (18.5 km/h; 11.5 mph)
- Complement: 97 (USS Westport)
- Armament: 1 × 4" or 4.7" gun, 10 × machine guns or 1 × 4" or 4.7" gun, 6 × Oerlikon guns and 4 machine guns (Empire Nightingale)

USS Westport (ID-3548) was a United States Navy cargo ship in commission from 1918 to 1919.

== Description ==
The ship was built in 1918 by Ames Shipbuilding and Drydock Company, Seattle, Washington. She was yard number 8.

The ship was 409 feet 5 inches (124.79 m) long, with a beam of 54 feet 2 inches (16.51 m). She had a depth of 27 feet 4 inches (8.33 m), and a draught of 24 ft 11¼ in (7.60 m). She was assessed at 5,665 GRT, 3,529 NRT. 12,175 DWT.

The ship was propelled by a 543 nhp triple expansion steam engine, which had cylinders of 26 inches (66 cm), 43 inches (110 cm) and 73 inches (190 cm) in diameter by 48 inches (120 cm) stroke. The engine was built by Ames, it drove a single screw propeller. The engine could propel the ship at a speed of 10 knots (19 km/h).

== Construction, acquisition, and commissioning ==
Westport was constructed as the commercial single-screw cargo ship SS Westport for the United States Shipping Board On 10 September 1918, the Shipping Board transferred her to the U.S. Navy for use during World War I; the Navy assigned her the naval registry identification number 3548 and commissioned her the same day as USS Westport (ID-3548).

== History ==
=== United States Navy service ===
Assigned to the Naval Overseas Transportation Service, Westport got underway from Seattle bound for Arica, Chile. One there, she loaded a cargo of nitrates and departed on 8 November 1918, three days before the Armistice with Germany brought World War I to an end on 11 November 1918. She transited the Panama Canal and arrived at Baltimore, Maryland, on 28 November 1918. She discharged her cargo there.

After taking aboard a shipment of railroad supplies for the United States Army in France, Westport got underway from Baltimore, Maryland on 1 January 1919 for her first transatlantic crossing. She arrived at Brest, France, on 21 January 1919 and unloaded there. She then took on board 1,438 tons of U.S. Army return cargo before departing Brest on 15 February 1919 for the United States. Reaching Baltimore on 14 March 1919, she discharged her cargo there before heading for New York on 24 March 1919. She arrived at New York on 26 March 1919.

Westport was both decommissioned and stricken from the Navy List on 31 March 1919. The Navy transferred her back to the United States Shipping Board the same day.

=== Between the wars ===
Westport was allocated the United States Official Number 216901 and the Code Letters KMVF. Her port of registry was Seattle. In 1934, her Code Letters were changed to KLCZ.

=== World War II ===
In 1941, Westport was transferred to the Ministry of War Transport and renamed Empire Nightingale. The United Kingdom Official Number 168191 and Code Letters GNDS were allocated. Her port of registry was changed to London and she was placed under the management of Mungo, Campbell & Co Ltd.

Empire Nightingale would appear to have crossed the Atlantic Ocean from the United States independently, as she does not appear as a member of a convoy until 27 June, when she departed Middlesbrough, Yorkshire as a member of Convoy EC 31. The convoy had departed from Southend, Essex the previous day and arrived at the Clyde on 1 July. She left the convoy at Oban, Argyllshire, departing on 3 July for Baltimore, Maryland, United States, which was reached on 22 July. Empire Nightingale departed Baltimore on 10 August for Halifax, Nova Scotia, Canada, arriving five days later. Carrying a cargo of steel, she departed on 21 August with Convoy HX 146, which arrived at Liverpool, Lancashire on 6 September. She left the convoy at Loch Ewe to join Convoy WN 177, which departed from Oban on 5 September and arrived at Methil, Fife on 8 September. Empire Nightingale then joined Convoy FS 589, which departed that day and arrived at Southend on 10 September. She left the convoy at Hull, Yorkshire on 10 September.

Empire Nightingale sailed on 2 October for Middlesbrough, arriving the next day. She departed on 13 October to join Convoy FN 531, which had departed from Southend the previous day and arrived at Methil on 14 October. Empire Nightingale sailed the next day to join Convoy EC 85, which had departed from Southend on 13 October and arrived at the Clyde on 18 October. She left the convoy at Loch Ewe on 17 October and joined Convoy ON 27, which had departed from Liverpool on 16 October and dispersed at sea on 2 November. Her destination was Reykjavík, Iceland, where she arrived on 23 November. She departed on 19 December to join Convoy ON 47, but put back into Reykjavík on 21 December. Empire Nightingale sailed again on 23 December to join Convoy ON 49, which had departed from Liverpool on 21 December and dispersed at sea on 5 January 1942. Her destination was Boston, Massachusetts, where she arrived on 9 January.

Empire Nightingale departed from Boston on 14 February for Halifax, arriving three days later. Carrying general cargo bound for Hull, she then joined Convoy SC 71, which departed on 22 February and arrived at Liverpool on 10 March. She left the convoy at Loch Ewe on 9 March and reached Hull on 15 March via convoys WN 256 and FS 749.

Empire Nightingale departed from Hull on 30 March to join Convoy FN 668, which had departed from Southend the previous day and arrived at Methil on 31 March. She then joined Convoy EN 67, which sailed on 4 April and arrived at Oban two days later. She left the convoy at Loch Ewe, arriving on 7 April. Empire Nightingale then sailed to Halifax, from where she joined Convoy XB 13. That convoy departed on 24 April and arrived at Boston two days later. She left the convoy at the Cape Cod Canal and sailed to Philadelphia, Pennsylvania, arriving on 29 April. She departed on 10 May for New York, arriving the same day and sailing the next day for Cape Cod Bay, where she arrived on 13 May. Empire Nightingale then joined convoy BX 16, which had departed from Boston and arrived at Halifax on 14 May. Carrying a cargo of steel, she departed with Convoy HX 191 on 24 May. The convoy arrived at Liverpool on 6 June, but Empire Nightingal left the convoy at the Belfast Lough the previous day. She then joined Convoy BB 183, which departed on 7 June and arrived at Milford Haven, Pembrokeshire the next day. Her destination was Newport, Monmouthshire, where she arrived on 9 June.

Empire Nightingale sailed on 19 June for Swansea, Glamorgan, arriving that day. She departed Swansea on 27 June for Milford Haven, arriving the next day. On 6 July, she departed to join Convoy ON 110, which sailed from Liverpool on 6 July and arrived at Boston on 26 July. Her cargo was coal. She departed on 11 August for Cape Cod Bay, arriving the next day. Empire Nightingale then joined Convoy BX 33, which had departed from Boston on 14 August and arrived at Halifax two days later. Carrying general cargo and steel bound for Hull, she joined Convoy SC 97, which departed on 22 August and arrived at Liverpool on 7 September. She left the convoy at Loch Ewe, reaching Hull on 11 September via convoys WN 333 and FS 903.

Empire Nightingale departed from Hull around 22 September, joining Convoy FN 819. That convoy had departed from Southend on 21 September and arrived at Methil two days later. She then joined Convoy EN 141, arriving at Loch Ewe on 25 September. She then joined Convoy ON 134, which departed from Liverpool on 26 September and arrived at New York on 17 October. Her destination was Botwood, Newfoundland, which was reached on 25 October by leaving the convoy at St. John's, Newfoundland on 10 October and joining Convoy JN 20 on 24 October. Empire Nightingale departed from Botwood on 2 November with Convoy NJ 20, arriving at St. John's two days later. She then joined Convoy SC 108, which had departed from New York on 1 November and arrived at Liverpool on 19 November. Her cargos was concentrates, which had been loaded in Wabana, Newfoundland. She left the convoy at the Belfast Lough on 18 November, joining Convoy BB 236. That convoy arrived at Milford Haven the next day, from where Empire Nightingale sailed to Avonmouth, Somerset, arriving on 20 November.

Empire Nightingale departed Avonmouth on 4 December for Penarth, Glamorgan, arriving later that day. She departed Penarth on 16 December for the Clyde, arriving three days later. She joined Convoy KMS 7G, which sailed on 7 January 1943 and arrived at Algiers, Algeria on 21 January. Her destination was Bougie, where she arrived on 22 January. Empire Nightingale departed Bougie under escort on 3 February for Algiers, arriving two days later. She then joined Convoy MKS 7, which departed on 5 February and arrived at Liverpool on 17 February. Her destination was Barrow-in-Furness, Lancashire, where she arrived that day.

Empire Nightingale sailed from Barrow-in-Furness on 20 February for Liverpool, arriving later that day. She departed from Liverpool on 10 March for Belfast, arriving the next day. She joined Convoy KMS 11G from Belfast Lough on 14 March. The convoy had departed from the Clyde that day and arrived at Bône, Algeria on 28 March. She left the convoy at Philippeville, Algeria that day. Empire Nightingale departed from Philippeville on 4 April to join Convoy ET 17. That convoy had departed from Bône and arrived at Gibraltar on 9 April. She then joined Convoy MKS 11, which had departed from Bône on 10 April and arrived at Liverpool on 23 April. Carrying a cargo of nitrates, she left the convoy at the Belfast Lough to join Convoy BB 284. That convoy departed on 24 April and arrived at Milford Haven the next day. Her destination was Swansea, arriving on 26 April.

Empire Nightingale did not sail in Convoy OS 49 km as planned, but instead departed from Swansea on 16 June for Milford Haven, arriving the next day. She then joined the combined Convoy OS 50/KMS 17. The convoys departed from Liverpool on 16 June and separated at Sea on 27 June. Convoy OS 50 arrived at Freetown, Sierra Leone on 8 July. Empire Nightingale was in the part of the convoy that formed KMS 17G and arrived at Gibraltar on 29 June. Her cargo was described as "stores" and was bound for Algiers. On this voyage, she was armed with a 4-inch or 4.7-inch gun and ten machine guns. Convoy KMS 17 continued on to Sfax, Tunisia, arriving on 6 July. She arrived at Algiers on 3 July. Empire Nightingale departed Algiers on 24 July for Gibraltar. She sailed from Gibraltar on 28 July to join Convoy GUS 10X, which had departed from Tripoli, Libya on 21 July and arrived at the Hampton Roads, United States on 13 August. She left the convoy at Casablanca, Morocco, on 29 July. Empire Nightingale departed the next day with Convoy CG 52, arriving at Gibraltar the next day. Carrying a cargo of phosphates, she joined Convoy MKS 20, which departed that day and arrived at Liverpool on 10 August. She left the convoy at Loch Ewe. Her destination was Ipswich, Suffolk, which was reached on 14 August via convoys WN 456A and FS 1192.

Empire Nightingale sailed from Ipswich on 26 August to join Convoy FN 1109, which had departed from Southend the previous day and arrived at Methil on 27 August. She left the convoy at Middlesbrough on 27 August. Empire Nightingale sailed from Middlesbrough on 20 September to join convoy FN 1130, which had departed from Southend the previous day and arrived at Methil on 21 September. She then joined Convoy EN 285, which departed on 24 September and arrived at Loch Ewe two days later. Empire Nightingale then joined Convoy KMS 28G, which departed from Liverpool on 26 September and arrived at Gibraltar on 7 October. Her destination was Lisbon, Portugal, which was reached on 7 October. She departed from Lisbon on 26 October and sailed to Casablanca, from where she departed on 3 November to join Convoy MKS 29G. That convoy had departed from Gibraltar on that day and arrived at Liverpool on 18 November. Empire Nightingale sailed on to Loch Ewe, and then joined Convoy WN 507. That convoy departed on 19 November and arrived at Methil two days later. She left the convoy at Dundee, Perthshire on 21 November, departing four days later for Aberdeen, where she arrived later that day.

Empire Nightingale sailed from Aberdeen on 5 January 1944 to join Convoy EN 328, which had departed from Methil the previous day and arrived at Loch Ewe on 6 January. Her destination was the Clyde, arriving on 9 January. She departed the Clyde on 25 January to join combined Convoy OS66 km, which had departed from Liverpool the previous day and split at sea on 5 February to form convoys OS66 and KMS 40. Convoy OS 66 arrived at Freetown on 15 February. Empire Nightingale was in the portion of the convoy that formed KMS 40 and arrived at Gibraltar on 7 February. She was carrying a cargo of coal which was stated to be bound for Algiers and Oran, Algeria. Her armament on this voyage was a 4-inch or 4.7-inch gun, six Oerlikon guns and four machine guns. Convoy KMS 40 continued on to Port Said, Egypt. She left the convoy at Oran on 8 February. Empire Nightingale departed from Oran on 1 March to join Convoy MKS 41. That convoy had departed from Port Said on 19 February and arrived at Gibraltar on 2 March. The convoy continued as MKS 41G, which rendezvoused at sea with Convoy SL 150 and arrived at Liverpool on 2 March. She was carrying a cargo of iron ore, which was bound for Middlesbrough. That port was reached on 18 March via Loch Ewe and convoys WN 557 and FS 1394.

Empire Nightingale departed from Middlesbrough on 19 April to join Convoy FN 1330, which had departed from Southend two days earlier and arrived at Methil later that day. She then joined Convoy EN 377, which departed on 29 April and arrived at Loch Ewe on 1 May. She then joined the combined Convoy OS 76 / KMS 50, which departed from Liverpool on 2 May and separated at sea on 13 May. Convoy OS 76 arrived at Freetown on 22 May. Empire Nightingale was in the portion of the convoy that formed KMS 50G and arrived at Gibraltar on 15 May. Her cargo consisted of mail and stores and was stated as bound for Taranto, Apulia, Italy. Convoy KMS 50 continued on to Port Said, arriving on 25 May. Empire Nightingale left the convoy at Augusta, Sicily, arriving on 3 June. She departed the next day to join Convoy AH 44. The convoy arrived at Bari on 23 May, but she left the convoy at Brindisi on 22 May. Empire Nightingale departed Brindisi on 1 June to join Convoy HA 46. That convoy had departed from Bari on 31 May and arrived at Augusta on 3 June. She sailed the next day to join Convoy MKS 51, which had departed from Port Said on 30 May and arrived at Gibraltar on 9 June. She left the convoy at Bizerta, Algeria, where she arrived on 6 June, departing later that day and sailing to Bône, arriving the next day. She later sailed to Gibraltar. Empire Nightingale sailed with Convoy MKS 53 G on 29 June, but put back into Gibraltar the next day. She sailed on 10 July with Convoy MKS 54, which rendezvoused at sea with Convoy SL 163 and arrived at Liverpool on 22 July. She was carrying a cargo of iron ore bound for Barrow-in-Furness, arriving on 22 July.

Empire Nightingale departed from Barrow-in-Furness on 31 July for the Clyde, arriving the next day. She departed on 25 August to join the combined Convoy OS 87/KMS 61, which had departed from Liverpool that day and separated at Sea on 3 September. Convoy OS 87 arrived at Freetown on 13 September. Empire Nightingale was in the portion of the convoy that formed KMS 61 and arrived at Gibraltar on 4 September. She was carrying explosives and stores bound for Malta. Her armament consisted a 4-inch or 4.7-inch gun and ten machine guns. Convoy KMS 61 continued on to Port Said, arriving on 14 September. Empire Nightingale left the convoy at Augusta, arriving on 10 September. She then joined Convoy VN 64A, which departed that day and arrived at Naples, Campania, Italy on 12 September. She sailed from Naples on 22 September and arrived at Malta on 24 September via Augusta. Empire Nightingale departed Malta on 6 October to join Convoy GUS 54, which had departed from Port Said on 2 October and arrived at the Hampton Roads on 28 October. She left the convoy at Bône on 8 October, departing a week later to join Convoy MKS 64, which had departed from Port Said on 6 October and arrived at Gibraltar on 18 October. Empire Nightingale left the convoy at Oran on 18 October. She sailed on 21 October for Gibraltar, arriving the next day. She departed on 29 October with Convoy MKS 65G, which rendezvoused at sea with Convoy SL 174 and arrived at Liverpool on 7 November. Her cargo of iron ore was bound for Barrow-in-Furness, which was reached on 12 November.

Empire Nightingale departed from Barrow-in-Furness on 28 November and sailed to the Belfast Lough, arriving the next day. She then joined Convoy ONS 37, which had departed from Liverpool on 28 November and arrived at Halifax on 21 December. She was bound for New York, which was reached by leaving the convoy at St. John's on 21 December and then sailing on 17 January 1945 with Convoy WB 155 to Sydney, Cape Breton, Nova Scotia, arriving the next day. Empire Nightingale then joined Convoy SH 198, which sailed that day and arrived at Halifax on 20 January. She departed three days later with Convoy XB 143, which arrived at Boston on 26 January. She left the convoy at the Cape Cod Canal and arrived at New York on 27 January.

=== Post-war ===
Empire Nightingale departed from New York on 6 May with Convoy NG 506, which arrived at Guantánamo Bay, Cuba on 13 May. She left the convoy at Nuevitas on 12 May. She then sailed to Puerto Tarafa, from where she departed on 29 May for New York, arriving on 3 June. She passed Cape Henry, Virginia on 4 June and arrived at Falmouth, Cornwall, United Kingdom on 19 June. Sailing the same day, Empire Nightingale arrived at The Downs on 21 June and sailed on to Immingham, Lincolnshire, arriving on 23 June.

Empire Nightingale departed from Immingham on 26 June. She is next recorded as departing from Safi, Morocco on 9 August and arriving at La Pallice, Charente-Maritime, France on 15 August. She sailed on 28 August for Newport, Monmouthshire, where she arrived on 31 August. She departed on 4 September for Casablanca, Morocco, arriving on 9 September and sailing the next day for Hull, Yorkshire, where she arrived on 18 September. Empire Nightingale departed on 6 October for Montreal, Quebec, Canada, arriving on 20 October. She sailed on 3 November for Le Havre, Seine-Maritime, France, arriving on 21 November.

In May 1946, Empire Nightingale was advertised for sale or charter. She was available for sale at £20,000 or charter at £750 per month on a three-year charter or £500 a month on a five-year charter. She was sold to Williamson & Co Ltd, Hong Kong and renamed Inchmull. She was sold in 1948 to Scindia Steam Navigation Corporation and renamed Jamalatsya. In 1953, she was sold to Richard Nathan Corporation, New York and renamed Ricnat. She was scrapped at Bo'ness, West Lothian, United Kingdom later that year.
