= List of Empire ships (I–J) =

== Suffix beginning with I ==
=== Empire Ibex ===
Empire Ibex was a 7,208 GRT (9,600 DWT) cargo ship which was built by Skinner & Eddy Corp. Seattle. Completed in 1918 as Edgefield for the United States Shipping Board (USSB). To MoWT in 1941 and renamed Empire Ibex. On 1 July 1943, Empire Ibex was in collision with Empire MacAlpine in the north Atlantic (53°30′N 36°25′W) and was severely damaged, abandoned on 2 July and sank.

=== Empire Imp ===
Empire Imp was a 129 GRT tug which was built by Cochrane & Sons Ltd, Selby. Launched on 22 May 1942 and completed in July 1942. Capsized on 1 August 1942 and sank at Pembroke Dock, Pembrokeshire. Refloated on 19 August and repaired. Sold in 1960 to H. G. Pounds, Portsmouth. Sold in 1961 to J. D. Irving, Canada and renamed Irving Walnut. Scuttled off the east coast of Canada in March 1969.

=== Empire Impala ===
Empire Impala was a 6,113 GRT (9,400 DWT) cargo ship which was built by Virginia Shipbuilding Corp, Alexandria, Virginia. Laid down as Boshbish for the USSB and completed in 1920 as Clemence C Morse for the United States Transportation Co. To USSB in 1923 and renamed Oakman. To Lykes Brothers-Ripley Steamship Co Inc in 1933. To MoWT in 1940 and renamed Empire Impala. On 7 March 1943, Empire Impala was a member of Convoy SC 121. She stopped to pick up survivors from SS Egyptian which had been torpedoed by U-230 when she was herself torpedoed by U-591 and sunk.

=== Empire Indus ===
Empire Indus was a 5,155 GRT cargo ship which was built by Blohm & Voss, Hamburg. Launched in 1923 as Gera for German Australian Line, 1926 combined with Hamburg America Line. On 4 April 1941, she was scuttled at Massawa, Eritrea prior to the capture of the port by British forces. On 8 September 1942 she was refloated and beached to enable temporary repairs to be carried out. To MoWT and renamed Empire Indus. On 2 May 1943, she left Massawa under tow by SS Mantola, arriving in Karachi, India on 13 May where she was repaired. On 14 April 1944, she was badly damaged as a result of the explosion of the SS Fort Stikine at Bombay. Repairs were completed in November 1945. Sold in 1946 to Arden Hall Steamship Co, Cape Town. Renamed Bosveld in 1947. Sold in 1948 to Pan Ocean Navigation Co, Panama and renamed Pan Ocean. On 6 April 1958 she developed a leak and foundered 160 nautical miles (300 km) north-west of Alexandria, Egypt. (33°15′N 27°55′E).

=== Empire Industry ===
Empire Industry was a 3,721 GRT cargo ship which was built by Vuijk en Zoon, Capelle aan den IJssel, Netherlands. Launched in 1916 as Leersum. Sold in 1939 to E Oldendorff, Lübeck and renamed Henning Oldendorf. On 17 November 1939, she was captured by HMS Colombo in the Denmark Strait. She was taken to Lerwick and then Liverpool. To MoWT and renamed Empire Industry. On 16 March 1941, Empire Industry was sunk by the German battleship Scharnhorst at 43°27′N 45°25′W. Empire Industry is shown Ellis Island Records 1943?

=== Empire Inventor (I) ===
Empire Inventor was a 9,515 GRT cargo and passenger ship built by AG Weser, Bremen. Launched in 1922 as Werra for Norddeutscher Lloyd. Sold in 1935 to Societá Italia Flotte Riuniti, Genoa and renamed Calabria. Sold in 1937 to Lloyd Triestino, Trieste. On 10 June 1940 she was seized as a war prize at Calcutta. The MoWT allocated her to the British-India SN Co and intended to rename her Empire Inventor, but on 8 December 1940 she was torpedoed by U-103 and sunk at 52°43′N 10°07′W.

=== Empire Inventor (II) ===
Empire Inventor was a 9,912 GRT tanker which was built by Sir J. Laing & Sons Ltd., Sunderland. Launched on 22 April 1943 and completed in January 1944. Sold in 1946 to British Oil Shipping Co. Ltd and renamed Vivian Louise. Sold in 1955 to Stanhope Steamship Co. Ltd., renamed Stanloch. Arrived at Savona for breaking on 20 March 1959.

=== Empire Irving ===
Empire Irving was a 7,071 GRT cargo ship built by William Gray & Co. Ltd, West Hartlepool. She was launched on 25 April 1944 and completed in June. Sold in 1946 to Ropner Shipping Co. Ltd. and renamed Bellerby. Sold to Iranian Lloyd Co. Ltd. in 1960 and renamed Persian Cambyssis. Sold to Iranian Shipping Lines S.A. in 1964, renamed Iranian Trader then Shiraz. Arrested at Dammam, Saudi Arabia in May 1966, derelict by 1969. Drove ashore on 26 January 1970. Sold in September 1970 E. Matrood and Essa Zarco Bayrainis, Bahrain. Renamed Sayhet and placed under the Saudi Arabian flag. Sold in 1972 to Gulf Navigation Co., Saudi Arabia. Resold later that year to Euroasia Carriers Ltd for demolition. Scrapped December 1972 at Gadani Beach, Pakistan.

=== Empire Iseult ===
Empire Iseult was a 7,170 GRT cargo ship which was built by J L Thompson & Sons Ltd, Sunderland. Launched on 14 May 1942 and completed in July 1942. To the Dutch Government in 1943 and renamed Frans van Mieris. Sold in 1946 to Stoomvart Maatschappij Ostzee and renamed Farmsum. Operated under the management of Vinke & Zonen, Amsterdam. Sold in 1950 to E Hsian Steamship Co Ltd, Hong Kong and renamed Kin Ming. Sold in 1965 to Kai Tai Marine Lines Ltd, Formosa and renamed Kai Queen. Operated under the management of China Union Lines Ltd. Scrapped in September 1969 at Kaohsiung, Taiwan.

=== Empire Islander ===
Empire Islander was a 2,066 GRT (2,900 DWT) collier which was built by Grangemouth Dockyard Co Ltd, Grangemouth. Launched on 22 June 1943 and completed in August 1943. Sold in 1949 to Henry & McGregor Ltd, Leith and renamed Rattray Head. Sold in 1960 to Gino Gardella, Italy, and renamed Brick Quarto. Scrapped in October 1973 at Savona, Italy.

=== Empire Isle ===
Empire Isle was a 402 GRT (480 DWT) coaster which was built by Henry Scarr Ltd, Hessle. Launched on 18 February 1941 and completed in July 1941. Sold in 1945 to Comben, Longstaff & Co Ltd and renamed Suffolkbrook. Sold in 1948 to Lovering & Sons Ltd, Cardiff and renamed Fennel. Sold in 1952 to Hindlea Shipping Co Ltd and renamed Hindlea. Operated under the management of J L Hindmarsh, Cardiff. Lengthened in 1959, now 506 GRT (725 DWT). On 27 October 1959 she was driven ashore in Moelfre Bay, Anglesey and broke in two. Wreckage looted by local inhabitants. Declared a total loss.

=== Empire Ivy ===
Empire Ivy was a 263 GRT tug which was built by Goole Shipbuilding & Repairing Co Ltd, Goole. Launched on 22 October 1941 and completed in July 1942. Sold in 1946 to Clyde Shipping Co Ltd and renamed Flying Tempest. Sold in 1962 to Societa Salvataggi Siciliana, Italy, and renamed Poetto. Renamed Montelungo in 1968, scrapped in 1982.

== Suffix beginning with J ==
=== Empire Jack ===
Empire Jack was a 734 GRT (1,015 DWT) coaster which was built by Vickers Armstrongs Ltd Barrow in Furness. Launched on 4 October 1941 as River Fisher and completed in December 1941 as Empire Jack. Sold in 1946 to J Fisher & Sons Ltd, Barrow in Furness and renamed River Fisher. Sold in 1967 to Greenore Ferry Services Ltd, Dublin and renamed Owenduv. Sold in 1971 to Compagnia Marittima Fogana SA, Panama. Capsized on 13 January 1972 and sank after cargo shifted, 10 nautical miles (19 km) off Leixões, Portugal.

=== Empire Jaguar ===
Empire Jaguar was a 5,186 GRT (8,500 DWT) cargo ship which was built by Uchida Shipbuilding & Engineering Co, Yokohama, Japan. Completed in May 1919 as Eastern Glade for USSB. To American South African Line Inc in 1926 and then to Postal Steamship Corp, New York in 1934. To MoWT in 1940 and renamed Empire Jaguar. Torpedoed on 8 December 1940 and sunk by U-103 at 51°34′N 17°35′W.

=== Empire Jamaica ===
Empire Jamaica was a 3,538 GRT cargo ship which was built by William Gray & Co Ltd, West Hartlepool. Launched on 16 November 1944 and completed in January 1945. Sold in 1951 to Western Steamship Co Ltd and renamed Westway. Operated under the management of Wang Kee & Co, Hong Kong. Sold in 1958 to Djakarta Lloyd, Indonesia and renamed Djajapratama. Sold in 1967 to Trikora Lloyd, Indonesia. Arrived on 23 December 1970 at Hong Kong for scrapping.

=== Empire Jane ===
Empire Jane was a 235 GRT tug which was built by A Hall & Co Ltd, Aberdeen. Launched on 25 April 1944 and completed in June 1944. Sold in 1947 to Union Steamship Company of New Zealand and renamed Taioma. In 1978 she was preserved at the Tauranga Historic Village museum, Tauranga, New Zealand. The museum closed and Taioma was purchased in March 2000 by the Taioma Reef Society to be sunk as a dive wreck in the Bay of Plenty.

=== Empire Janus ===
Empire Janus was a 575 GRT whaler which was built by Kaldnes Mekaniske Verkstad, Tønsberg, Norway. Launched in 1944 as Jan Mayen but was requisitioned by Germany. Seized in May 1945 as a war prize. To MoWT and renamed Empire Janus. Sold in 1947 to Christian Salvesen & Co Ltd, Leith and renamed Southern Main. Scrapped in 1964 at Odense, Denmark.

=== Empire Javelin ===
Empire Javelin was a 7,177 GRT (11,650 tons displacement) type C1-S-AY1 landing ship which was built by Consolidated Steel Corp, Wilmington, California. Laid down as Cape Lobos and completed in January 1944 as Empire Javelin for the MoWT. Torpedoed on 28 December 1944 and sunk by U-772 at 50°05′N 01°00′W while a member of Convoy TBC 1.

=== Empire Jean (I) ===
Empire Jean was a 487 GRT tug which was built by Clelands (Successors) Ltd, Willington Quay-on-Tyne. Launched on 17 October 1944 and completed in January 1945 as Empire Mary. Sold in 1946 to Overseas Towage & Salvage Co Ltd and renamed Marinia. Sold in 1950 to Union des Remorquage de Dakar and renamed W Ponty. Renamed Ponty in 1954. Sold in 1961 to Société Belge Remorquage Oceanique, Ostend, Belgium and renamed Ocean Bull. Sold in 1965 to SA Italiene Lavore e Maritimi, Italy and renamed Nettuno. Renamed Nettuno Sailem in 1984 and scrapped in May 1985 in Palermo, Italy.

=== Empire Jean (II) ===
Empire Jean was a 593 GRT tug which was built by Clelands (Successors) Ltd, Willington Quay-on-Tyne. Launched on 30 December 1944 as Empire Rosa and completed in April 1945 as Empire Jean. Sold in 1946 to Metal Industries Ltd and renamed Metinda III. To Armada Española in 1961 and renamed R A 3.

=== Empire Jenny ===
Empire Jenny was a 275 GRT tug which was built by Cochrane & Sons Ltd, Selby. Launched on 4 October 1944 and completed in January 1945. To the Admiralty in 1947 and renamed Aid. Sold in 1960 to H G Pounds, Portsmouth. Sold in 1961 to J D Irving Ltd, Canada and renamed Irving Teak. Scrapped in June 1977 in Canada.

=== Empire Jessica ===
Empire Jessica was a 2,847 GRT cargo ship which was built by Ailsa Shipbuilding Co Ltd Troon. Launched on 24 March 1943 and completed in May 1943. To the French Government in 1945 and renamed Joseph Blot. Sold in 1954 to Armement Leon Mazzella et Compagnie, Algeria, and renamed Leon Mazzella. Sold in 1960 to Loris Compagnia Navigazione SA, Panama and renamed Loris. Sold in 1966 to Compagnia Maritima Santa Barbara Sa, Panama, and renamed Agia Varvara. Scrapped in January 1975 at İzmir, Turkey.

=== Empire Jester ===
Empire Jester was a 261 GRT tug which was built by Goole Shipbuilding & Repairing Co Ltd, Goole. Launched on 6 May 1943 and completed in July 1943. Sold in 1946 to William Watkins Ltd and renamed Napia. Sold in 1971 to J G Efthinou, Greece, and renamed Tolmiros. Sold in 1973 to L G Matsas, Greece. Scrapped in February 1986 at Perama, Greece.

=== Empire Jet ===
Empire Jet was an 8,134 GRT tanker which was built by Blythswood Shipbuilding Co Ltd, Glasgow. Launched on 27 May 1941 and completed in August 1941. Sold in 1946 to Bowring Steamship Co Ltd and renamed Regent Jaguar. Operated under the management of C T Bowring & Co Ltd. Arrived on 2 June 1958 at Briton Ferry for scrapping.

=== Empire Jewel (I) ===
Empire Jewel was a 2,370 GRT tanker which was built by Grangemouth Dockyard Co Ltd, Grangemouth. Launched on 12 June 1945 and completed in September 1945. Sold in 1946 to Anglo-Saxon Petroleum Co Ltd and renamed Fossarus. Sold in 1960 to Shell Tankers Ltd, scrapped in October 1960 in Singapore.

=== Empire Jewel (II) ===
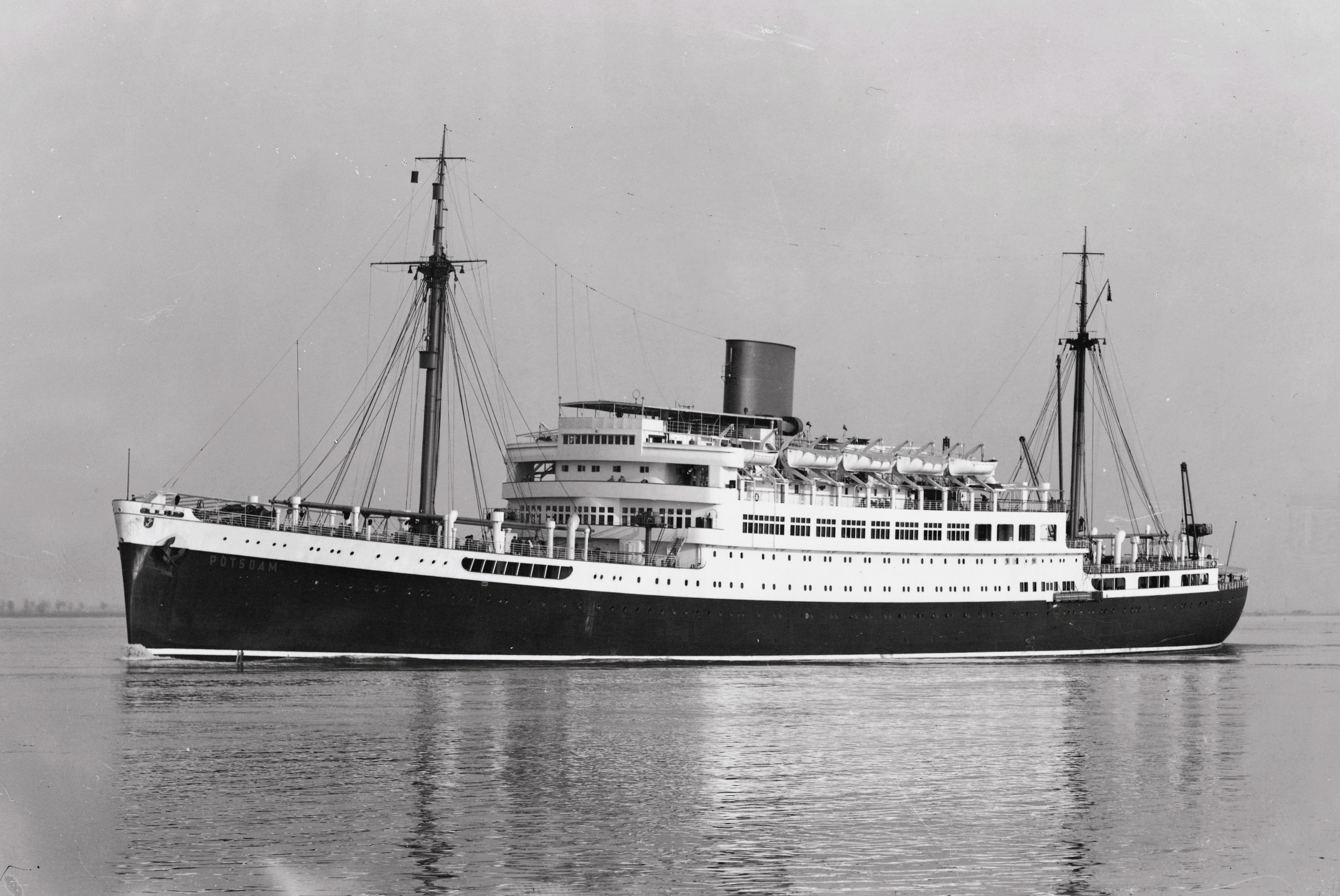
Potsdam

Empire Jewel was a 19,047 GRT ocean liner which was built by Blohm & Voss, Hamburg. Launched in 1935 as Potsdam for the Hamburg America Line. Was en route to the United States when war was declared. Returned to Germany by sailing around the top of Scotland and down the North Sea. Used as an accommodation ship at Hamburg, then as a troopship to Norwegian and Baltic ports. Took part in the Evacuation of East Prussia. Seized on 13 May 1945 at Flensburg. To MoWT and renamed Empire Jewel. Arrived on 19 June 1945 at Kiel and placed under armed guard with a Royal Navy contingent to prevent the Germans from using her to block the Kaiser Wilhelm Kanal. After arrival at Brunsbüttel the armed guard left and she was at anchor for three weeks with a full German crew. Sailed on 20 July 1945 with a detachment of Army guards bound for Methil. To Belfast in July 1945 for conversion to a troopship by Harland & Wolff Ltd. Completed in April 1946 and renamed Empire Fowey. Her high-pressure boilers caused problems for her crew, who were not used to this type of boiler. In March 1947 she was towed to the Clyde and refitted again, new boilers and geared turbines fitted, and the accommodation again refitted. Served as a troopship until 1957 and then chartered to the Pan-Islamic Steamship Co, Pakistan. Sold to them in 1960 and renamed Safina-E-Hujjaj. Scrapped in October 1976 at Gadani Beach, Pakistan.

=== Empire Jill ===
Empire Jill was a 739 GRT (1,015 DWT) coaster which was built by S P Austin & Sons Ltd, Sunderland. Launched on 15 January 1942 and completed in April 1942. Sold in 1946 to J Fisher & Sons Ltd, Barrow in Furness, and renamed Race Fisher. Sold in 1967 to M J Motraghi, Iran.

=== Empire Joan ===
Empire Joan was a 203 GRT tug which was built by Cochrane & Sons Ltd, Selby. Launched on 8 January 1943 and completed in May 1943. To the Admiralty in 1947 and renamed Emphatic. Sold in 1958 to E Handcock (1929) Ltd, Cardiff. Sold in 1960 to Bristol Channel Towage Co Ltd. Sold in 1963 to R & J H Rea Ltd and renamed Hallgarth. Scrapped in May 1966 at Newport, Monmouthshire.

=== Empire John ===
Empire John was a 487 GRT tug which was built by Clelands (Successors) Ltd, Willington Quay-on-Tyne. Launched on 21 April 1943 and completed in October 1943. Damaged on 21 August 1947 by a mine near Kiel, reached port and repaired. Sold in 1951 to Dominion Coal Co, Canada. Scrapped in December 1965 at Bilbao, Spain.

=== Empire Johnson ===
Empire Johnson was a 7,168 GRT cargo ship which was built by J L Thompson & Sons Ltd, Sunderland hull nr. 613. Launched on 20 October 1941 and completed in January 1942. To the Dutch Government in 1942 and renamed Paulus Potter. On 5 July 1942, she was damaged by bombs dropped by a German aircraft west of Novaya Zemlya after Convoy PQ 17 had scattered. Paulus Potter was abandoned by her crew. On 13 July 1942, she was torpedoed by U-255 and sunk in the Barents Sea.

=== Empire Jonathan ===
Empire Jonathan was a 235 GRT tug which was built by A Hall & Co Ltd, Aberdeen. Launched on 27 January 1944 and completed in March 1944. To the Admiralty in 1947 and renamed Fidget. Sold in 1971 to the Singaporean Government. Fitted with a diesel engine in 1973 by Straits Engineers Ltd, Singapore. Sold in 1975 to World Dredging Ltd, Panama. Sold in 1983 to Strel Ltd, Panama.

=== Empire Jonquil ===
Empire Jonquil was a 369 GRT coaster which was built by Gebroeders Bodewes Volharding, Foxhol, Netherlands. Launched in 1939 as Venus. Renamed Begonia in 1940 for Dutch owners. Requisitioned in 1940 and renamed Empire Jonquil. On 13 March 1947, she caught fire 20 nautical miles (37 km) northeast of the Outer Dowsing Lightship. She was abandoned but her engines were left in the "full ahead" position. Chased by a trawler and boarded, taken in tow and beached in the Humber Estuary where the fire was extinguished. Refloated and taken to Hull Docks where she sank. Declared a total constructive loss but raised, sold and repaired. Sold in 1948 to H P Marshall & Co, Middlesbrough, and renamed Marton. Sold in 1952 to Limerick Steamship Co Ltd, Limerick, Ireland and renamed Galtee Sold in 1961 to F Maggiani & Others, Italy and renamed Vittorio Bogazzi. Sold in 1970 to Carlo Figlie, Italy, and renamed Enrico Effe. She was scrapped in 1976. .

=== Empire Josephine ===
Empire Josephine was a 275 GRT tug which was built by Cochrane & Sons Ltd, Selby. Launched on 10 May 1944 and completed in September 1944. To The Admiralty in 1945 and sold in 1946 to the Hong Kong Government. Sold in 1965 to Yau Wing Co, Hong Kong and renamed Yau Wing No 25. sold in 1966 to Cheung Chau Shipping & Trading Co and renamed Fedredge Josephine. Operated under the management of Mollers Ltd, Hong Kong. Scrapped in September 1967 in Hong Kong.

=== Empire Joy ===
Empire Joy was a 9,895 GRT cargo ship which was built by J L Thompson & Sons Ltd, Sunderland. Launched on 13 March 1945 and completed in December 1945. sold in 1946 to the Eastern & Australian Steamship Co Ltd, London and renamed Nellore. Sold in 1966 to Austin Navigation Corporation Ltd, Panama and renamed Oriana. On 31 December 1966, she caught fire at Kaohsiung, Taiwan. Grounded due to the amount of water used to put the fire out, refloated on 4 January 1967 but declared a constructive total loss. Scrapped in December 1967 at Kaohsiung.

=== Empire Judy ===
Empire Judy was a 738 GRT coaster which was built by S P Austin & Sons Ltd, Sunderland. Launched on 5 April 1943 and completed in June 1943. Sold in 1946 to J Fisher & Sons Ltd, Barrow in Furness and renamed Stream Fisher. converted in 1965 to carry irradiated atomic fuel. Sold in 1969 to Grandport Shipping, Panama and renamed Ramaida. Operated under the management of J H Ramage. Scrapped in September 1977 at Lisbon, Portugal.

=== Empire Julia ===
Empire Julia was a 593 GRT tug which was built by Clelands (Successors) Ltd, Willington Quay-on-Tyne. Launched on 22 April 1944 and completed in July 1944. Sold in 1946 to United Towing Co Ltd and renamed Tradesman. On 3 June 1949 she was assisting Rifleman towing SS Norjerv to Strangford Lough, Northern Ireland, for scrapping when Norjerv broke in two and sank. Sold in 1963 to N E Vernicos Shipping Co Ltd, Greece, and renamed Vernicos Kitty. Scrapped in December 1974 at Kartal, Turkey.

=== Empire Jumna ===
Empire Jumna was a 2,370 GRT tanker which was built by Grangemouth Dockyard Co Ltd, Grangemouth. Launched on 31 October 1944 and completed in January 1945. Sold in 1946 to Anglo-Saxon Petroleum Co Ltd and renamed Fossularca. Sold in 1960 to Shell Tankers Ltd. Scrapped in May 1964 in Singapore.

=== Empire Juna ===
Empire Juna was a 292 GRT tug which was built by Cochrane & Sons Ltd, Selby. Launched on 8 February 1946 and completed in August 1946. Sold in 1947 to the Nigerian Government and renamed Balbus. Sold in 1967 to Tsavliris Salvage & Towage Ltd, Greece and renamed Nisos Poros. Scrapped in December 1970 in Greece.

=== Empire Jupiter ===
Empire Jupiter was an 8,217 GRT tanker which was built by Harland & Wolff Ltd, Govan. Launched on 21 September 1944 and completed in December 1944. To the French Government in 1946 and renamed Saint Gaudens. Sold in 1948 to Les Petroles d'Outre-Mer, France, and renamed Sevane. Sold in 1958 to Jugoslavenska Tankerska Plovidba, Yugoslavia and renamed Progres. Arrived on 9 November 1970 at Split for scrapping.

=== Empire Jura ===
Empire Jura was an 813 GRT coastal tanker which was built by A & J Inglis Ltd, Glasgow. Launched on 28 August 1944 and completed in October 1944. Sold in 1946 to Van Castricum & Co Ltd, London and renamed Samshoo. Sold in 1951 to Bulk Oil Steamship Co Ltd and renamed Pass of Glenogle. Sold in 1961 to A Garolla & Compagnie, Italy and renamed Marcello Garolla. Sold in 1969 to Sarda Bunkers SpA, Italy and renamed Marcello G. On 19 February 1972, she developed a list in bad weather at Naples, capsized and sank. Raised on 2 August 1972, declared a total constructive loss but repaired and returned to service. Scrapped in March 1979 at Naples.

== See also ==
The above entries give a precis of each ship's history. For a fuller account see the linked articles.

== Sources ==
- Mitchell, W H; Sawyer, L A (1990). The Empire Ships (Second ed.). London, New York, Hamburg, Hong Kong: Lloyd's of London Press Ltd. ISBN 1-85044-275-4.
