= List of Major League Baseball mascots =

This is a list of current and former League Baseball mascots, sorted alphabetically.

The tradition of the Major League Baseball mascot began with Mr. Met, introduced for the New York Mets when Shea Stadium opened in 1964. Although some mascots came and went over time, the popularity of mascots increased when the San Diego Chicken started independently making appearances at San Diego Padres games in 1977. Philadelphia Phillies management felt they needed a mascot similar to the Chicken, so they debuted the Phillie Phanatic in 1978.

All major league teams except the Angels, Dodgers, and Yankees have "official" mascots. Nine team mascots – Sluggerrr (Kansas City Royals), the Phillie Phanatic, Mr. Met, the Oriole Bird, Slider (Cleveland Guardians), Southpaw (Chicago White Sox), Orbit (Houston Astros), Lou Seal (San Francisco Giants), and Fredbird (St. Louis Cardinals) – have been inducted into the Mascot Hall of Fame. Several others have been nominated since the Hall's creation in 2005.

Mascots in MLB are often used to help market the team and league to young children.

== Current mascots ==
=== 5-Borough Mascot Race (New York Mets) ===
For the 2025 season, the New York Mets unveiled a mascot race known as the "5-Borough Mascot Race" with five mascots representing each of the five boroughs of New York City: the pizza slice (Brooklyn), the subway train (Queens), the skyscraper (Manhattan), the giraffe (The Bronx) and the ferry (Staten Island).

=== Ace (Toronto Blue Jays) ===
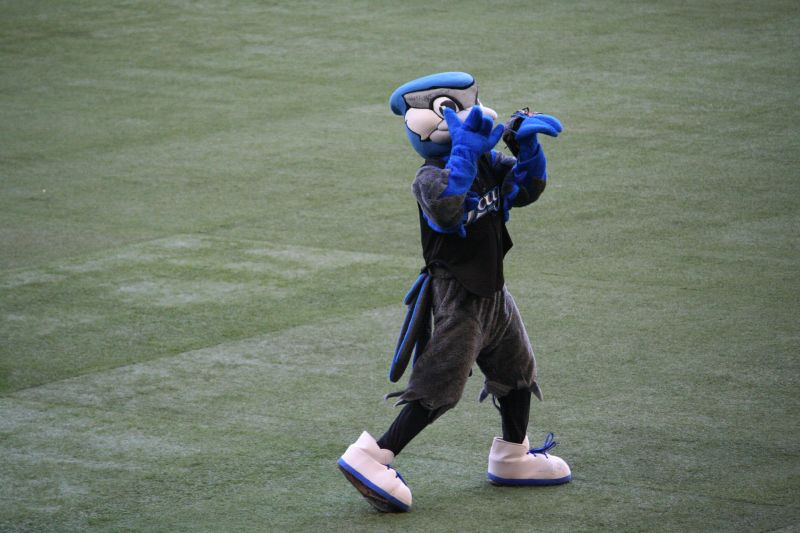
Ace, the Toronto Blue Jays mascot

Ace is the official mascot of the Toronto Blue Jays. He, along with his female counterpart, "Diamond" replaced former mascot BJ Birdie before the 2002 season as a mascot duo. Like his predecessor, Ace is a large anthropomorphic blue jay. The mascot name is baseball slang for a team's top starting pitcher (the "ace" of the staff, such as former Blue Jays pitcher Roy Halladay).

In 2004, Ace became the sole mascot of the team after Diamond was removed by the Blue Jays prior to the start of the season. In 2011, Blue Jays fans were introduced to his younger brother Junior (see below).

=== Barrelman (Milwaukee Brewers) ===
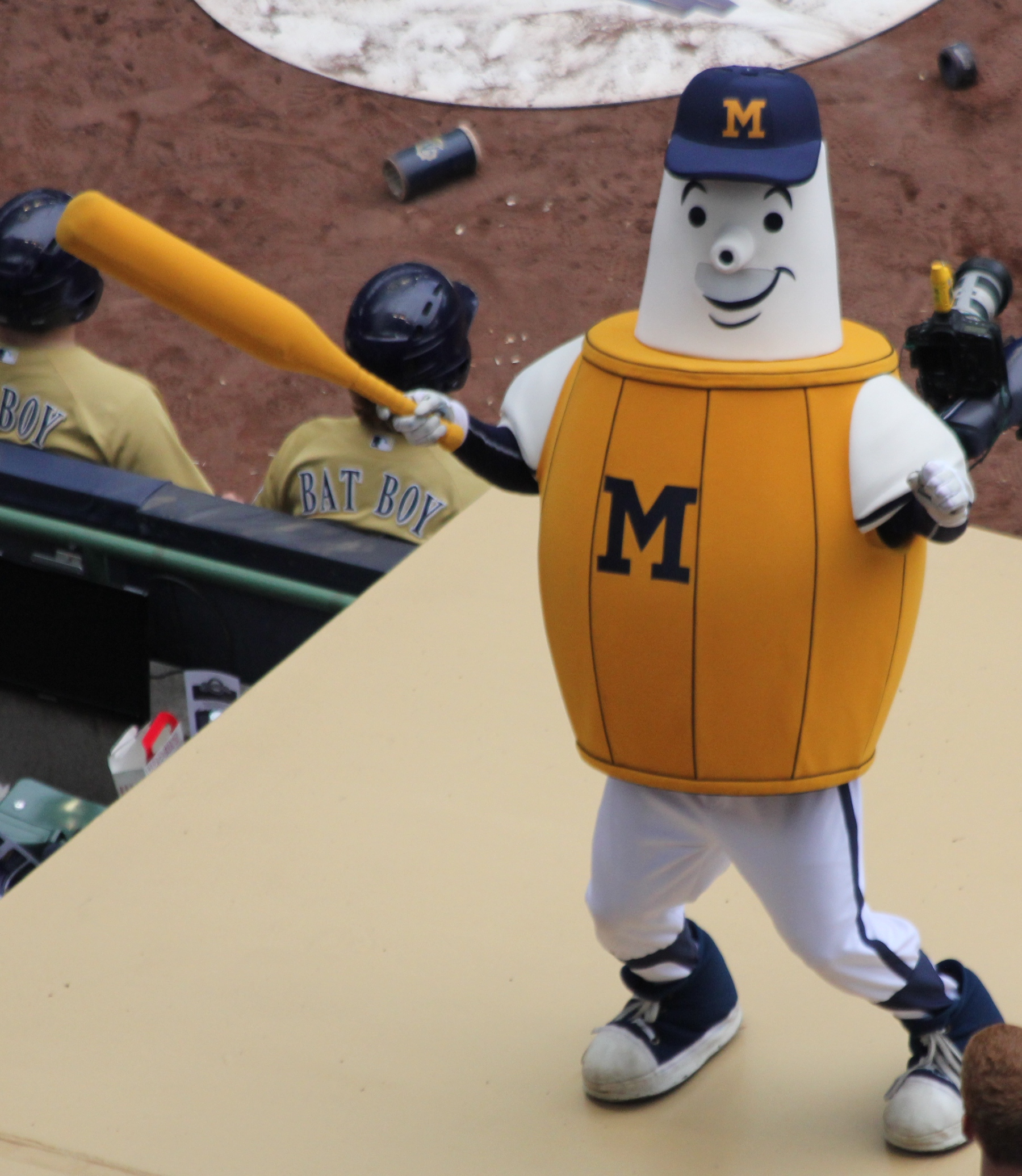
Barrelman, the Milwaukee Brewers mascot

Barrelman (aka "Owgust" and "Beer Barrel Man"), is an auxiliary mascot for the Milwaukee Brewers. He originated from a logo used by the original minor league Milwaukee Brewers of the American Association from the 1940s to 1952. He was resurrected and upgraded to be a costumed performing character in 2015. Before then, he was only used as an official logo image, and, since 1977, only appearing on special materials.

=== Baxter the Bobcat (Arizona Diamondbacks) ===
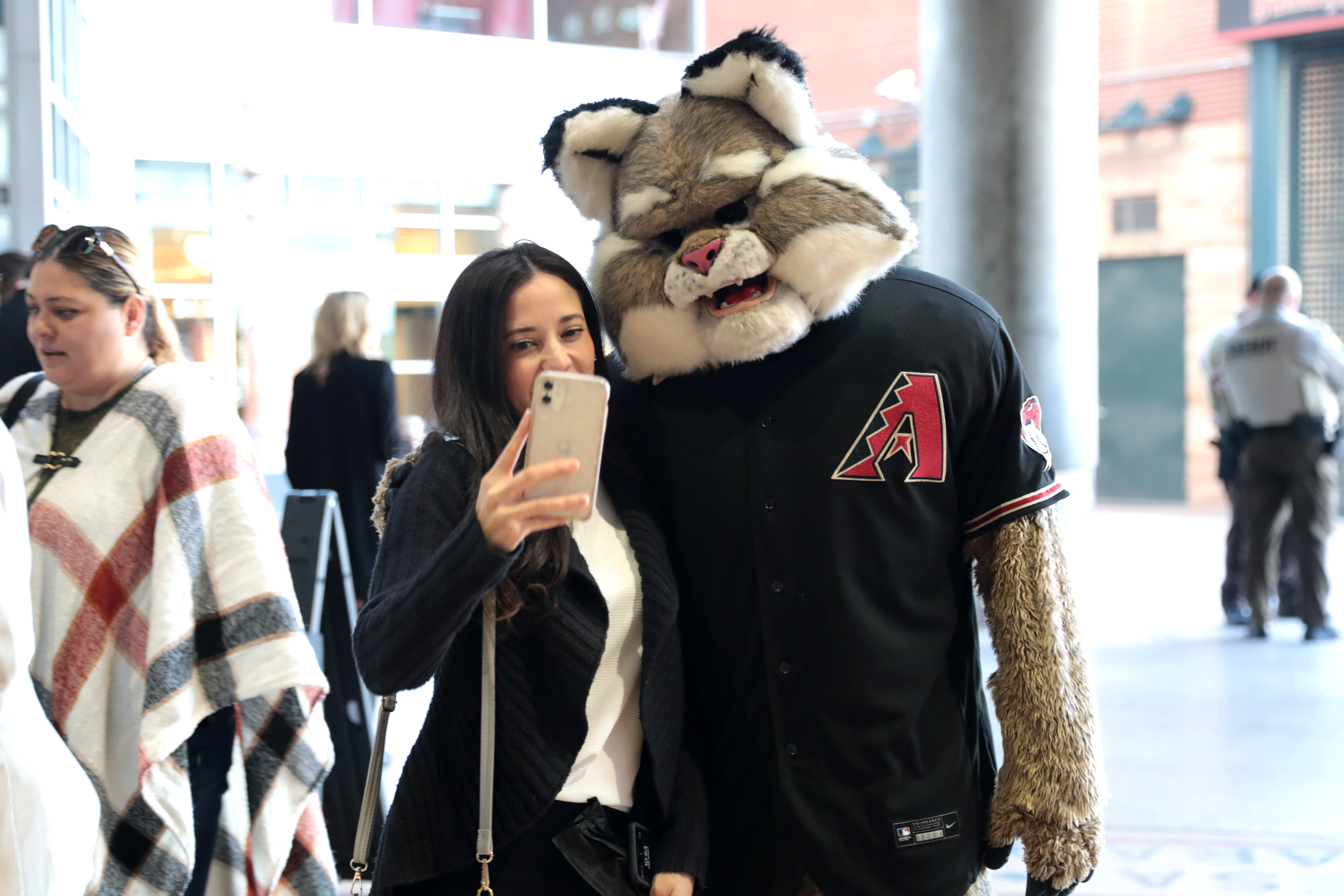
Baxter the Bobcat in January 2022

Baxter the Bobcat is the mascot of the Arizona Diamondbacks. His full name is D. Baxter the Bobcat, and he became the mascot in 2000. The mascot was created by Brantley Bell, the son of Jay Bell, one of the players on the Diamondbacks 1998 inaugural season roster. Brantley came up with the name from two sources. "D. Baxter" comes from the team's nickname, "the D-Backs". The bobcat is from the original name of the stadium where the Diamondbacks play. Today called Chase Field, it was once called Bank One Ballpark, or informally as "BOB" for short. The bobcat is a wild cat native to Arizona.

=== Bernie Brewer (Milwaukee Brewers) ===
Bernie Brewer is the official mascot for the Milwaukee Brewers. The Bernie Brewer character became the team's mascot in 1973, appearing as a cheerful man with a big mustache. A beer-barreled chalet was built for him inside the stadium where he led the crowd cheering. Following each home run and every victory by the Brewers, he would slide down and plunge himself into a huge beer mug in celebration. He was joined by a companion Bonnie Brewer, who would playfully swat at the backside of the opposing team's third base coach with a broom as the field crew swept the base paths.

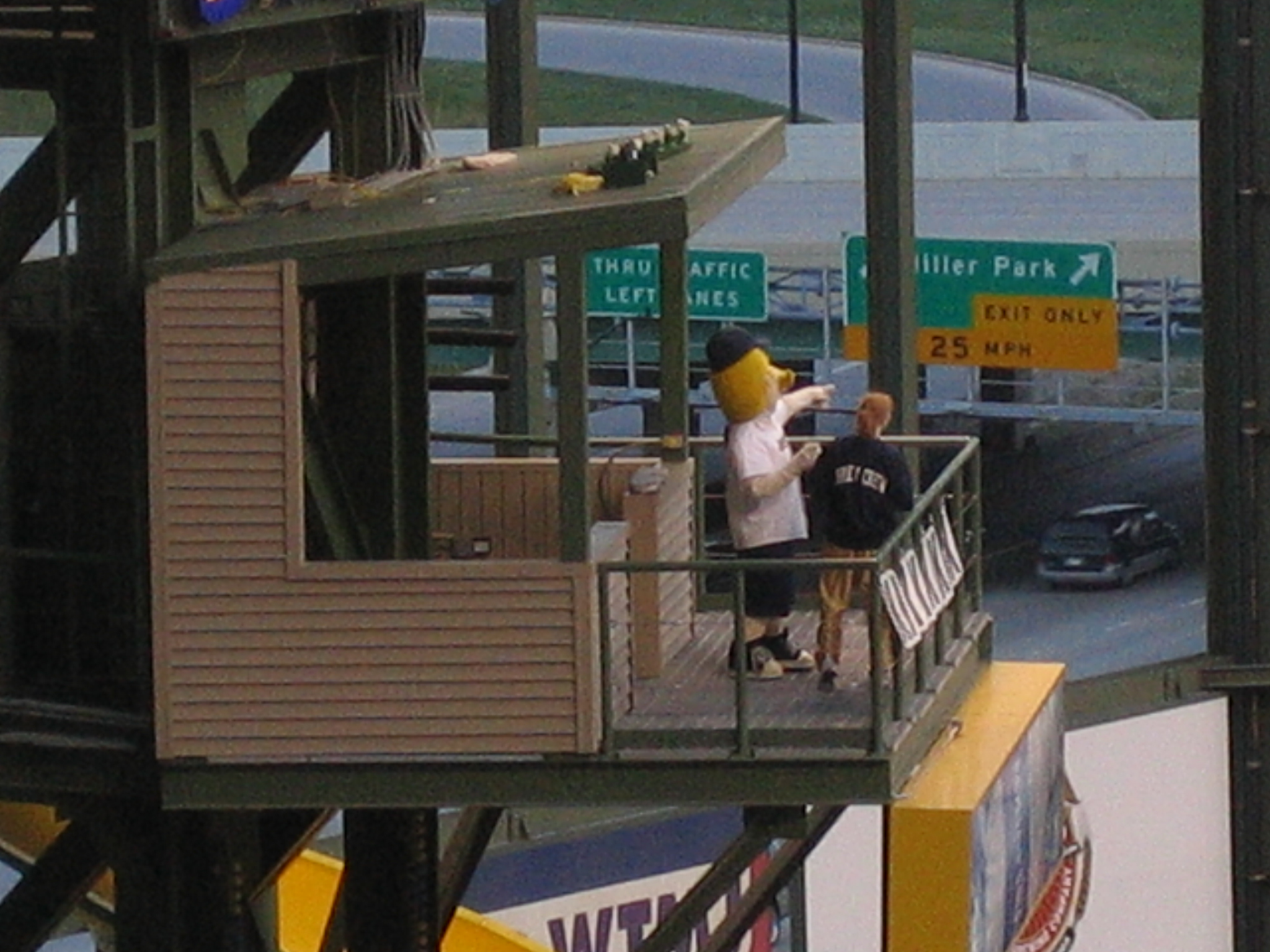
Bernie Brewer in his dugout at American Family Field

Bernie Brewer was a fixture at Brewers home games until 1984, when the Brewers re-built the bleachers at Milwaukee County Stadium, replacing the chalet with a sound tower and sending Bernie into retirement. By popular demand, Bernie Brewer came out of his retirement in 1993, when the fans voted for his return. Bernie was brought back not as just a mustachioed man in lederhosen, but a full-body costume of a man, including large foam head. The chalet was then rebuilt (it had been in storage on the third base side under the box seats) above the left-center field bleachers. The original beer mug that Bernie used to slide into is still in Milwaukee, Wisconsin as part of the Lakefront Brewery, Inc. tour.

In 2001, Bernie moved to American Family Field, and today the old chalet has become known as "Bernie's Dugout", stationed above the left field bleachers, where he cheers on for the team during home games. Currently he slides down a plastic yellow slide, no longer into a vat of beer but onto a platform in the shape of home plate when a Brewer hits a home run, while a sign tower with Bob Uecker's trademark home run call ("Get up, get up, get outta here, GONE!!") lights up above the Dugout, and he waves the team flag after landing in the bottom platform. When American Family Insurance bought the naming rights of the stadium, the dugout became "Bernie's Chalet", which pays homage to the old Milwaukee County Stadium chalet.

=== Billy The Marlin (Miami Marlins) ===
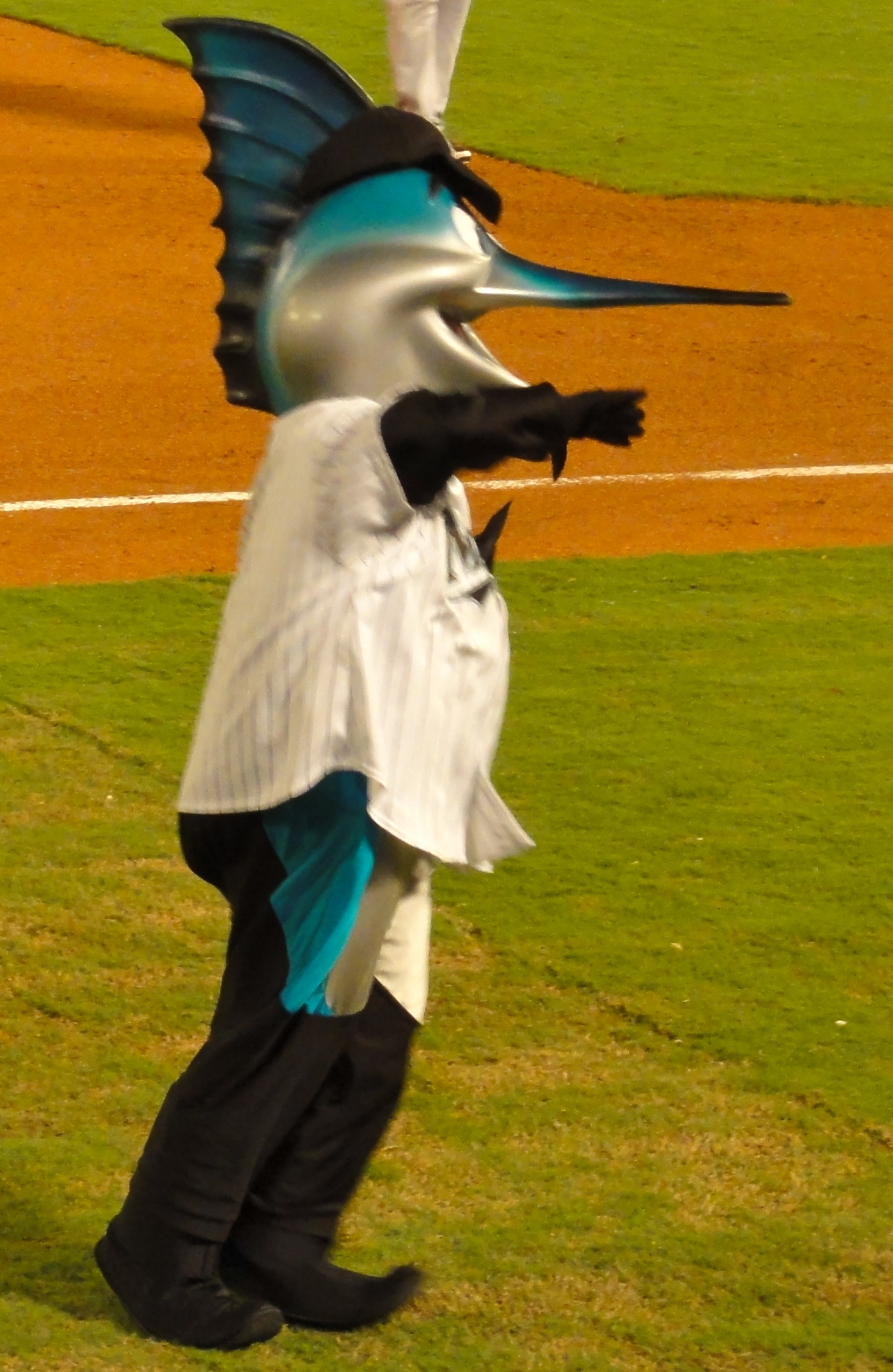
Billy the Marlin

Billy The Marlin is the official mascot of the Miami Marlins. Resembling a marlin with limbs, he can be seen at every Marlins home game. He competes in a waterboat race, which is an animated video shown on the screen, during each game. The name, picked by original team owner Wayne Huizenga, is derived from the fact that a marlin is a billfish, and Huizenga wanted a name that was different from the baseball type names of other mascots (like Slider and Sluggerrr) and one that children could remember more easily. On Mother's Day and Father's Day, Billy is joined by his parents, Bill Sr. and Betty the Marlin. Billy is also seen at games dancing with kids on the field in between innings and making special appearances in the Fan Zone.

On Opening Day of 1997, the year the Marlins won their first World Series Championship, a Navy SEAL who was parachuting into Hard Rock Stadium (then known as Pro Player Stadium) as Billy, lost the head in mid-air. While the crowd was unaware of the problem, media outlets had been alerted to Billy's parachute entrance. When he did not arrive, the media ran with the story, getting national attention and leading to ESPN's Dan Patrick's nightly quote, "Bring me the head of Billy the Marlin!"

The original Billy The Marlin was John Routh, who spent 10 years (1993–2002) entertaining Marlins fans. Routh previously portrayed the University of Miami mascots, Sebastian the Ibis and The Miami Maniac from 1983 to 1993, and prior to that, Cocky for the University of South Carolina Gamecocks.

=== Blooper (Atlanta Braves) ===
Since opening day 2018, Blooper has served as the current official mascot of the Atlanta Braves. Blooper has succeeded the Braves' "Homer the Brave" mascot after he went into retirement, He, too, has a X account and is present in community events in the Atlanta area and around all of Georgia. Usually wearing a Braves jersey, he is unique for wearing goggles with the uniform and the hat. During the shortened season of 2020, Blooper would walk around a post pictures of himself dressed up as famous characters like The Mandalorian, Bob Ross, and Guy Fieri.

=== Clark (Chicago Cubs) ===
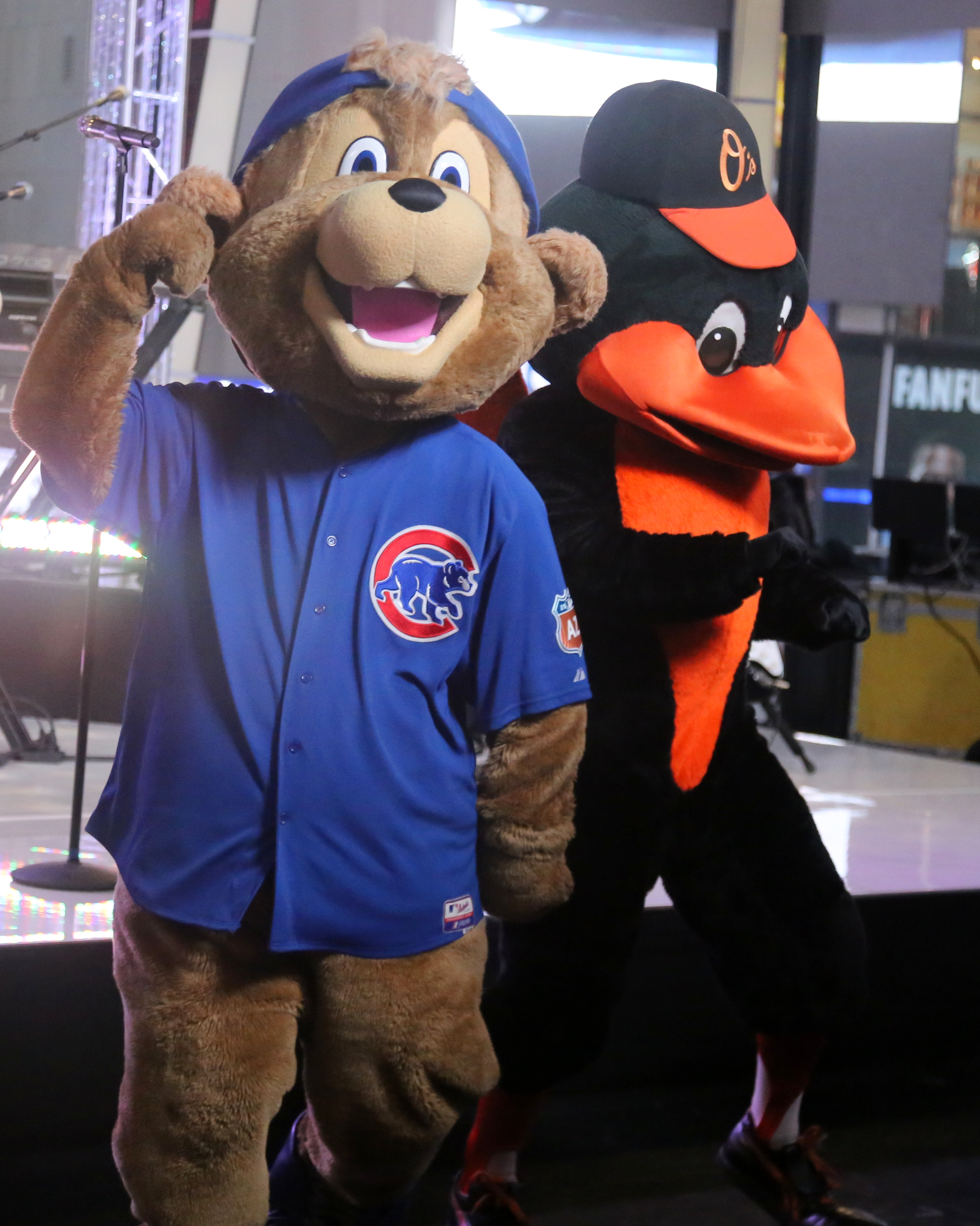
Clark with the Oriole Bird

On January 13, 2014, the Chicago Cubs announced that Clark, a "young, friendly Cub", would become the team's first official mascot in modern history. Clark was named after Clark Street, since the Cubs home field, Wrigley Field, is famously located at "Clark and Addison".

=== D-backs Luchador (Arizona Diamondbacks) ===
The D-backs Luchador is the second mascot of the Arizona Diamondbacks. After a giveaway of masks in June 2012 proved popular, the team introduced the Luchador as a permanent character in July 2013. He wears a black cape, red pants, and a mask patterned after the team's logo. Meant to represent the team's Hispanic fans, the Luchador also wrestles with Club Deportivo Coloseo at the Glendale Park and Swap.

=== Dinger (Colorado Rockies) ===
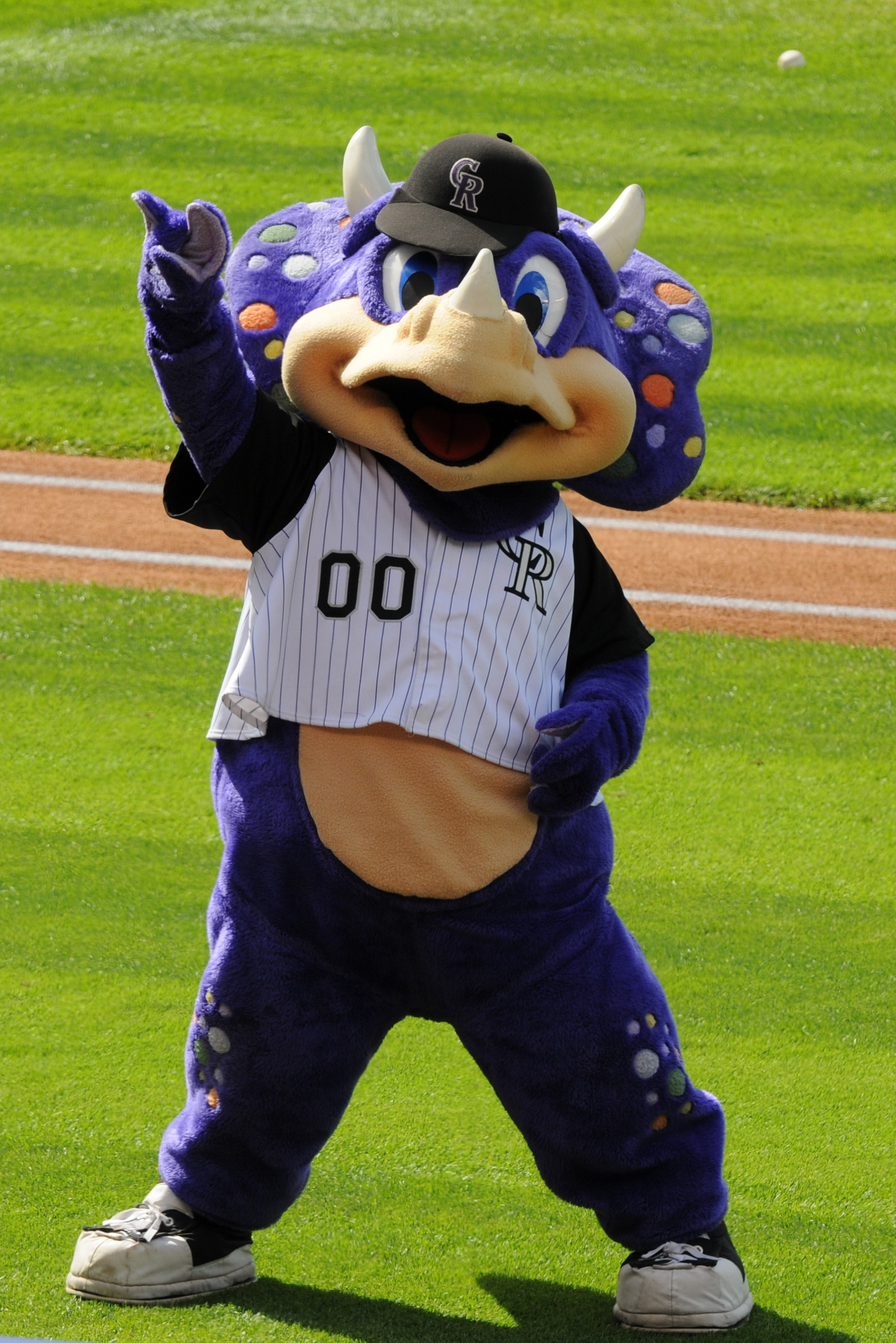
Dinger at Coors Field

Dinger is the official mascot of the Colorado Rockies. He is an anthropomorphic purple Triceratops. The choice of a dinosaur, specifically this type, was inspired by the discovery of some fossilized bone fragments which were found during the construction of the Rockies stadium Coors Field. The fossils included part of a rib, believed to be from a triceratops. His name "Dinger" is one of many slang terms for a home run.

Dinger is often seen on the field before and after the game and roaming around the stadium during the game. When Rockies hitters are at bat in the late innings of a game, he often dances in the seats immediately behind home plate in an effort to distract opposing pitchers, sitting down only immediately before the beginning motion of each pitch.

Dinger works year-round promoting physical fitness and literacy for thousands of elementary school students in the Rocky Mountain Region. He acts out his own Dinger Story for the kids. He also makes appearances at Children's Hospital Colorado and Denver Health. He makes appearances at Rockies events including the 5K Home Run, and the Rockies Rookies Kids Fan Club.

=== DJ Kitty (Tampa Bay Rays) ===
DJ Kitty is one of three mascots for the Tampa Bay Rays. DJ Kitty comes from the Internet sensation of a kitty playing a DJ System and dancing to the music. The black and white cat wears a Tampa Bay Rays ring, wears chains, and wears his Rays hat backwards. DJ Kitty became an official mascot for the Rays in 2012. The Tampa Bay Rays' other official mascots are Raymond and Stinger.

=== Fredbird (St. Louis Cardinals) ===
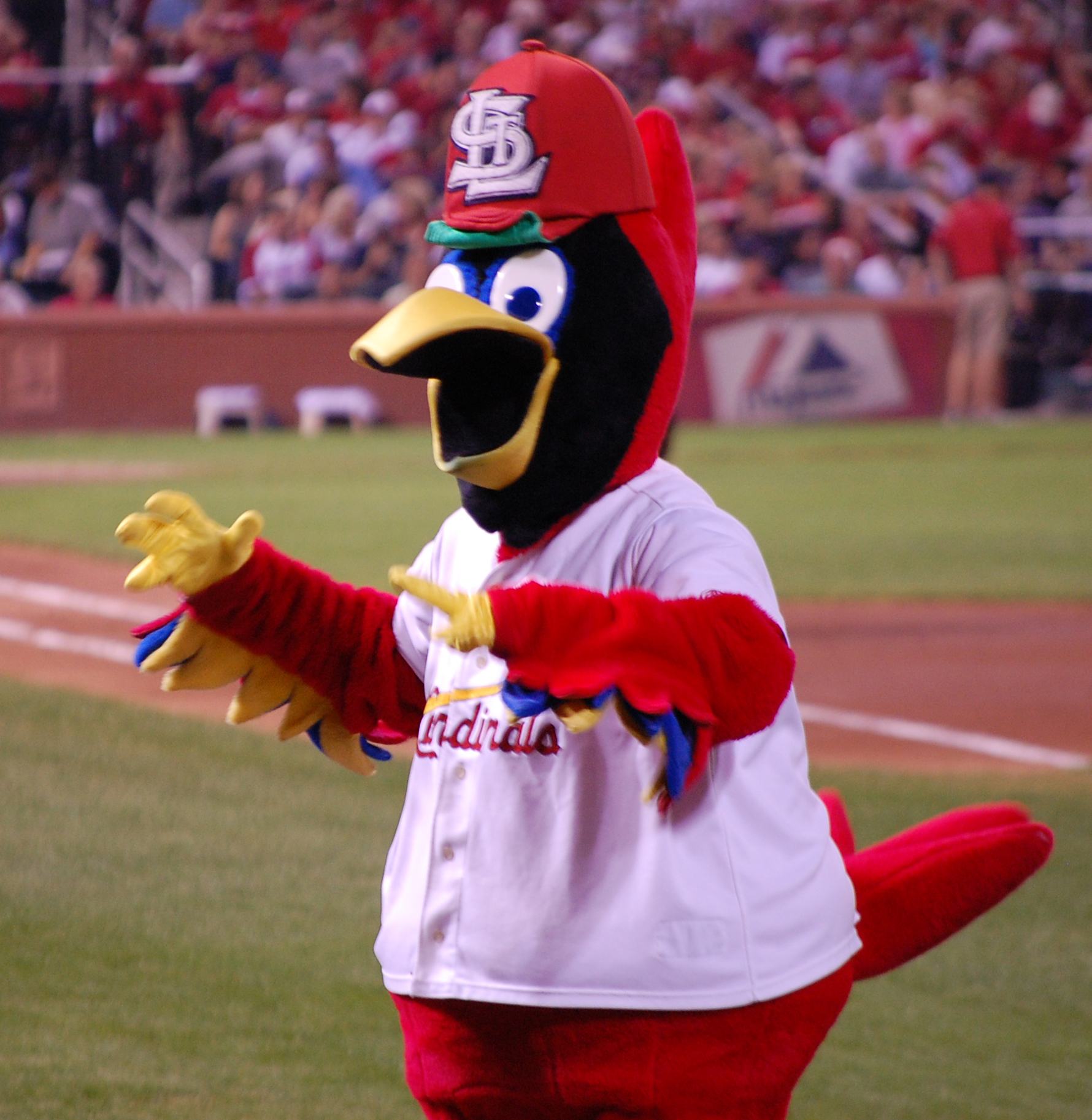
Fredbird entertaining the crowd between innings during a Cardinals game at Busch Stadium

Fredbird is the official mascot for the St. Louis Cardinals. He is an anthropomorphic cardinal wearing the team's uniform. A person dressed up as Fredbird can often be found entertaining young children during baseball games at Busch Stadium. His name is derived from "Redbird", a synonym for the cardinal bird and for the Cardinals themselves.

Fredbird was introduced in 1979 by the Cardinals, then owned by Anheuser-Busch, to entertain younger fans at the games. He quickly became popular with fans for his dancing, habit of "beaking" the heads of supporters, and for throwing T-shirts into the stands. In later years, he has been joined by "Team Fredbird", a group of young women employed by the club who help him with his T-shirt toss and occasionally in other duties.

Fredbird became part of the Mascot Hall of Fame in 2025.

=== Gapper (Cincinnati Reds) ===
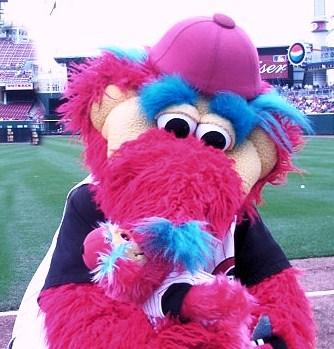
Gapper in 2005 signing a Gapper doll for a fan

Gapper is one of the current mascots for the Cincinnati Reds. Like his fellow mascots he wears a Reds jersey, but with a backwards cap. A furry, dog-like creature, the mascot was created by David Raymond's Raymond Entertainment Group, the founder being the man inside the Phillie Phanatic costume from 1973 to 1993. Gapper was first introduced in the winter of 2002, as the furry companion to the long-time mascot Mr. Red, as the franchise was preparing to move to their new home, Great American Ball Park. According to a Cincinnati CityBeat article, "Contestant Sam Frank submitted the winning name, which refers to the proverbial 'gap' between outfielders, earning two season tickets for his creativity." (The term "gapper" is a slang phrase for a batted ball hit to either left-center or right-center field which rolls to the fence.) According to a 2022 poll, of the Reds' four mascots, he is the not very popular with fans — he received 6.1% of the voting, Mr. Redlegs received 60.1%., Mr. Red received 28.2%, and Rosie Red received 5.6%.

=== Junior (Toronto Blue Jays) ===
Junior is the younger brother of Ace. He made his mascot debut in 2011. He is half the size of Ace and wears the number 1/2. He only appears on Jr. Jays Sundays (formerly on Saturdays, prior to the 2018 season).

=== Lou Seal (San Francisco Giants) ===
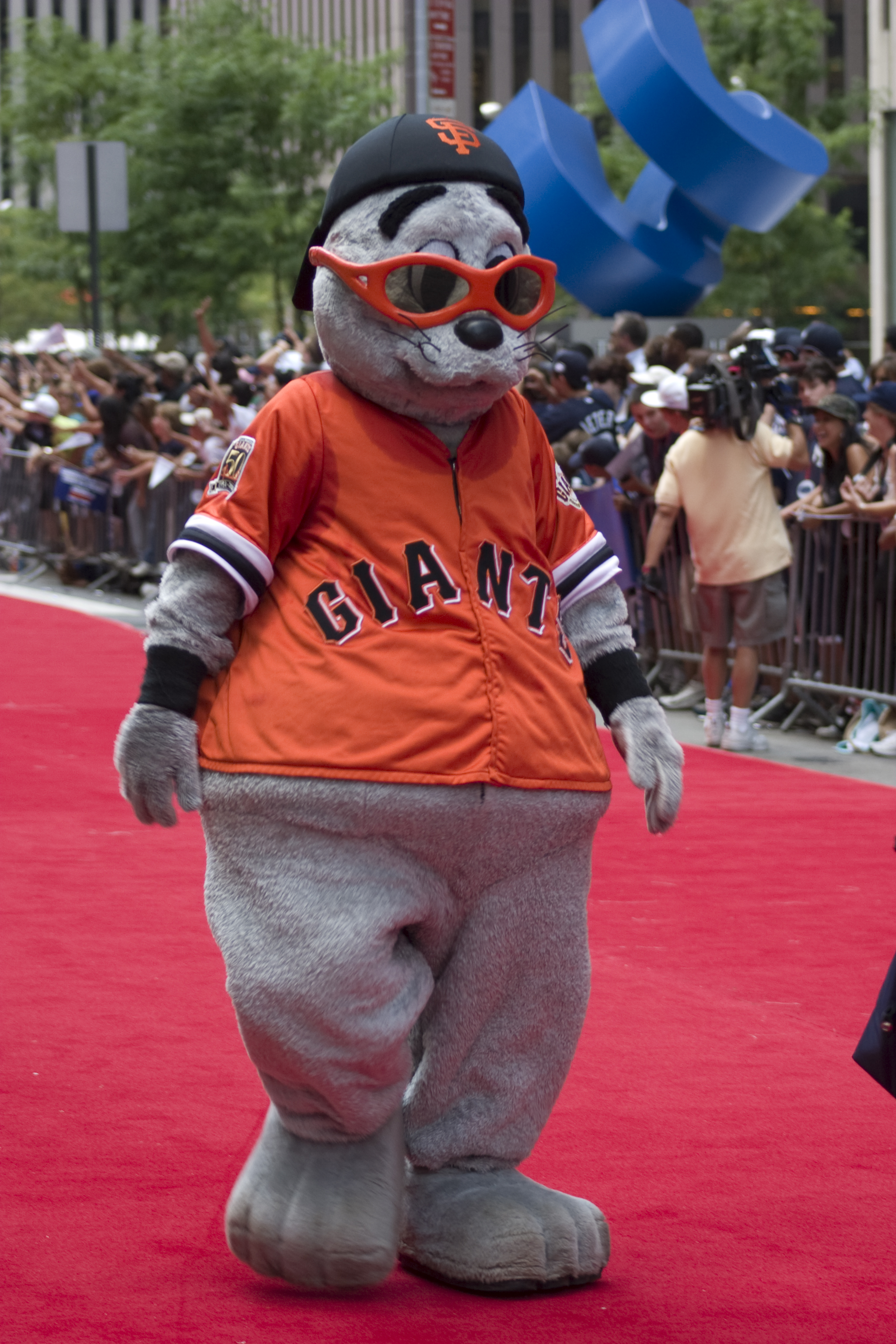
Lou Seal, mascot for the San Francisco Giants

Lou Seal is the official mascot of the San Francisco Giants. "Born" on July 25, 1996, Luigi Francisco Seal has been a regular part of all Giants home games, as well as numerous events in San Francisco and around the United States, ever since. Although his name (a play on the name "Lucille") is a bit ambiguous, he is indeed "officially" male and the person inside the costume is a man. Lou Seal is also a reference to the San Francisco Seals, the baseball club that was a mainstay of the Pacific Coast League from 1903 until 1957.

In a contest held by the Giants where fans were asked for ideas, six people submitted the name "Lou Seal". These lucky fans were then invited to a game that season where they sat in a luxury box and got to meet the newly named mascot, and one of them was randomly chosen to throw out the first pitch. He has had 1,150 consecutive home-game appearances, and is one of the four subjects followed in the second season of the Hulu series Behind the Mask. He primarily wears the team's main or orange alternate jersey at home games with the team cap but has varied his clothing and accessories to mark special occasions. For example, he wore a floating costume to swim after Barry Bonds' splash-hit home runs in San Francisco Bay's McCovey Cove and donned a giraffe hat in honor of Brandon Belt's nickname "Baby Giraffe".

Lou Seal also made occasional appearances at the Giants' High-A minor league team, the San Jose Giants. This practice ended in 2006 when the San Jose Giants introduced their own mascot named Gigante.

In 2013, Lou Seal participated in one of the most elaborate events staged by the Make-A-Wish Foundation. As part of the finale to a daylong event in San Francisco surrounding "Batkid" Miles Scott in 2013, Lou Seal was kidnapped by The Penguin and taken to the Giants' stadium, pursued by Batkid and Batman. After completing an obstacle course, Batman captured the Penguin while Batkid freed a grateful Lou Seal, who thanked him with a hug.

Lou Seal became part of the Mascot Hall of Fame in 2024.

=== Mariner Moose (Seattle Mariners) ===
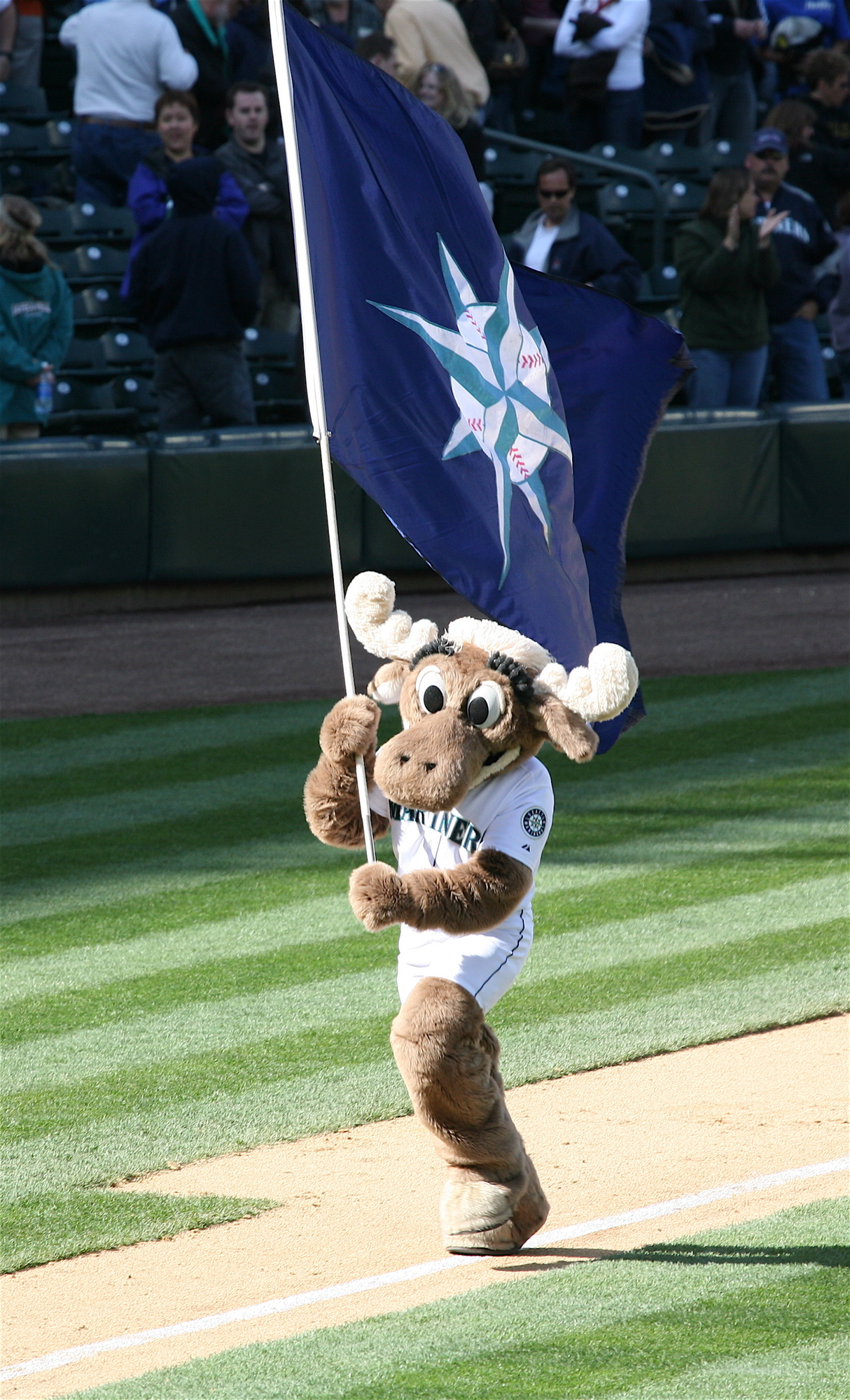
Mariner Moose

The Mariner Moose is the mascot of the Seattle Mariners. In 1990, a contest for children 14 and under was held to select a mascot, after 2,500 entries the club chose the "Mariner Moose" The Moose made his debut on April 13, 1990 dancing on the field at the Kingdome. During the 1995 American League Division Series between the Mariners and the New York Yankees, the Moose gained national attention when he broke his ankle crashing into the outfield wall at the Kingdome while being towed on inline skates behind an ATV in the outfield. Inline skating behind an ATV would continue to be a fan favorite until 1999, when the team moved to T-Mobile Park and a natural grass playing surface. Since then, the Moose has become quite adept at driving his own ATV around T-Mobile Park's warning track while performing various tricks and having water coolers emptied on him by bullpen pitchers.

The Moose makes several hundred appearances in the community each year in addition to Mariners home games, at everything from hospitals to wedding receptions. The Mariner Moose was featured on the ballot for the Mascot Hall of Fame in 2006 and 2007. He also nearly ran over Coco Crisp with his ATV in 2007, raising the ire of Red Sox pitching coach John Farrell.

=== Mr. Met (New York Mets) ===
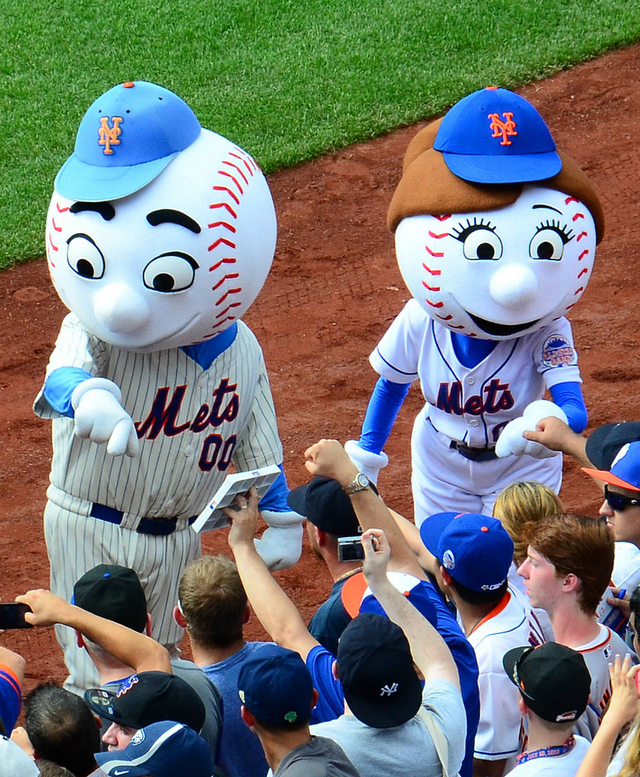
Mr. Met (left) and Mrs. Met (right)

Mr. Met is the official mascot of the New York Mets. He is a baseball-headed humanoid being who wears a Mets cap and uniform. He can be seen at Citi Field (and previously at Shea Stadium) during Mets home games. He also has appeared in several commercials as part of ESPN's This is SportsCenter campaign, and was selected in 2007 into the Mascot Hall of Fame. Starting in 2014, Mr. Met appeared as a sleeve patch on the Mets' blue alternate home and road jerseys.

=== Mrs. Met (New York Mets) ===
Mrs. Met (or Lady Met) is the female version of Mr. Met, the mascot of the New York Mets. She is a baseball-headed humanoid being, has brown hair in a ponytail and wears a Mets cap and uniform.

Mrs. Met first appeared at games in 1975 before disappearing into obscurity. She appeared with Mr. Met in a 2003 "This is SportsCenter" commercial. The Mets reintroduced Mrs. Met in mascot form in 2013. Her first name is Jan.

On August 7, 2026, Mrs. Met was declared as the first ever female sports mascot ever inducted into the Mascot Hall of Fame. She was selected along other mascots on the Good Morning America show.

=== Mr. Red (Cincinnati Reds) ===
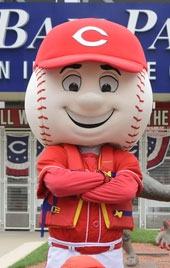
Mr. Red in 2017

Mr. Red is an official mascot of the Cincinnati Reds, first appearing as a cartoon figure in 1953 based on a 19th-century "Red Stockings" ballplayer, with a baseball for a head. The original version of the character, which featured a handlebar mustache and old-fashioned uniform, closely resembled what would later become Mr. Redlegs. The character appeared on Reds uniforms as a sleeve patch beginning in 1955, and later inspired the "Running Man" logo of the early 1960s. The current, clean-shaven Mr. Red/Running Man appeared in 1968, serving as the team's logo until 1992.

A live costumed Mr. Red — a humanoid figure dressed in a Reds uniform, with an oversized baseball for a head — debuted in 1973, becoming the team's first mascot. The mascot disappeared in the late 1980s. Mr. Red returned in 1997, but the fiberglass head was considered unsettling, and he was retired in 2007 in favor of a retro mustachioed Mr. Redlegs. Mr. Red was reintroduced in 2012 as a redesigned, friendlier character.

Both Mr. Red and Mr. Redlegs descend from the 1953 figure and now appear alongside Gapper and Rosie Red.

=== Mr. Redlegs (Cincinnati Reds) ===
Mr. Redlegs is a mascot of the Cincinnati Reds, introduced in 2007 as a retro counterpart to Mr. Red. His design is based on the original 1953 cartoon figure, featuring a handlebar mustache, old-fashioned "Red Stockings" uniform, and a kepi-style cap. While the early version of the character appeared on Reds uniforms as a sleeve patch in the 1950s, the live Mr. Redlegs was created in 2007 to celebrate the team's history and play a supporting role alongside Mr. Red. In 2008, he gained brief attention when an accident during pre-game antics caused his large baseball-shaped head to fall off, revealing the performer inside. He was seen a few days later wearing a neck brace as a joke.

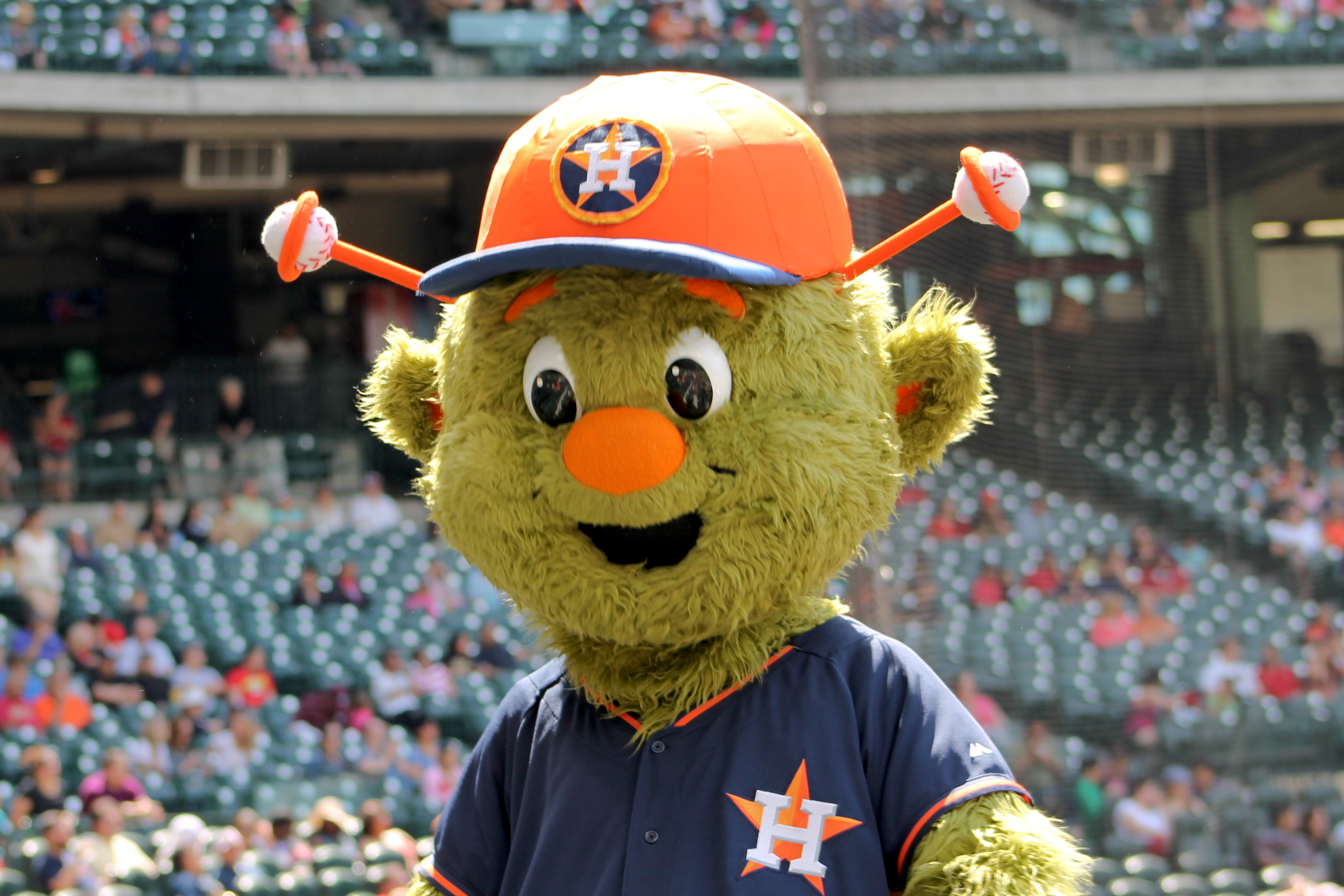
Orbit

=== Orbit (Houston Astros) ===
Orbit is the mascot of the Houston Astros. Orbit represents a green space alien with antennae, in keeping with the Space City theme of the city of Houston. Originally serving as team mascot from 1990 until 1999, he was replaced by a new mascot, Junction Jack.

To coincide with the Astros' move to the American League West and unveiling of their new uniforms, caps, and logo, Orbit was reintroduced on November 2, 2012, to serve as the Astros' mascot once more for 2013 and beyond. Orbit was inducted into the Mascot Hall of Fame in 2024.

=== The Oriole Bird (Baltimore Orioles) ===
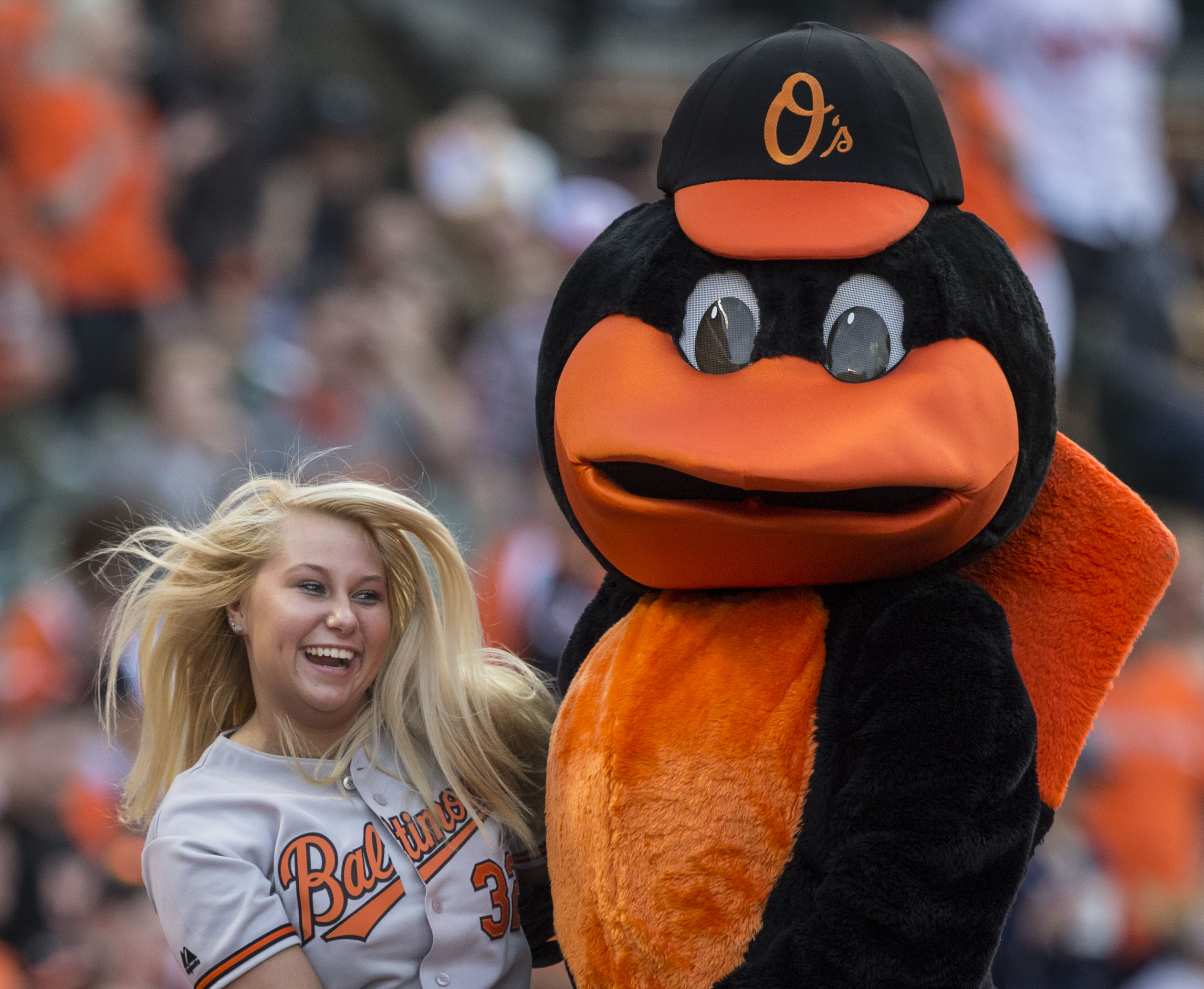
The Oriole Bird

The Oriole Bird is the official mascot of the Baltimore Orioles and is a cartoon version of the bird of the same name. He was "hatched" out of a giant egg prior to the team's 1979 season opener at Memorial Stadium on April 6. According to Orioles.com, The Oriole Bird's favorite foods are "mostly bird seed, with occasional crab cake." The Oriole Bird was named to the Mascot Hall of Fame in 2020.

=== PAWS (Detroit Tigers) ===
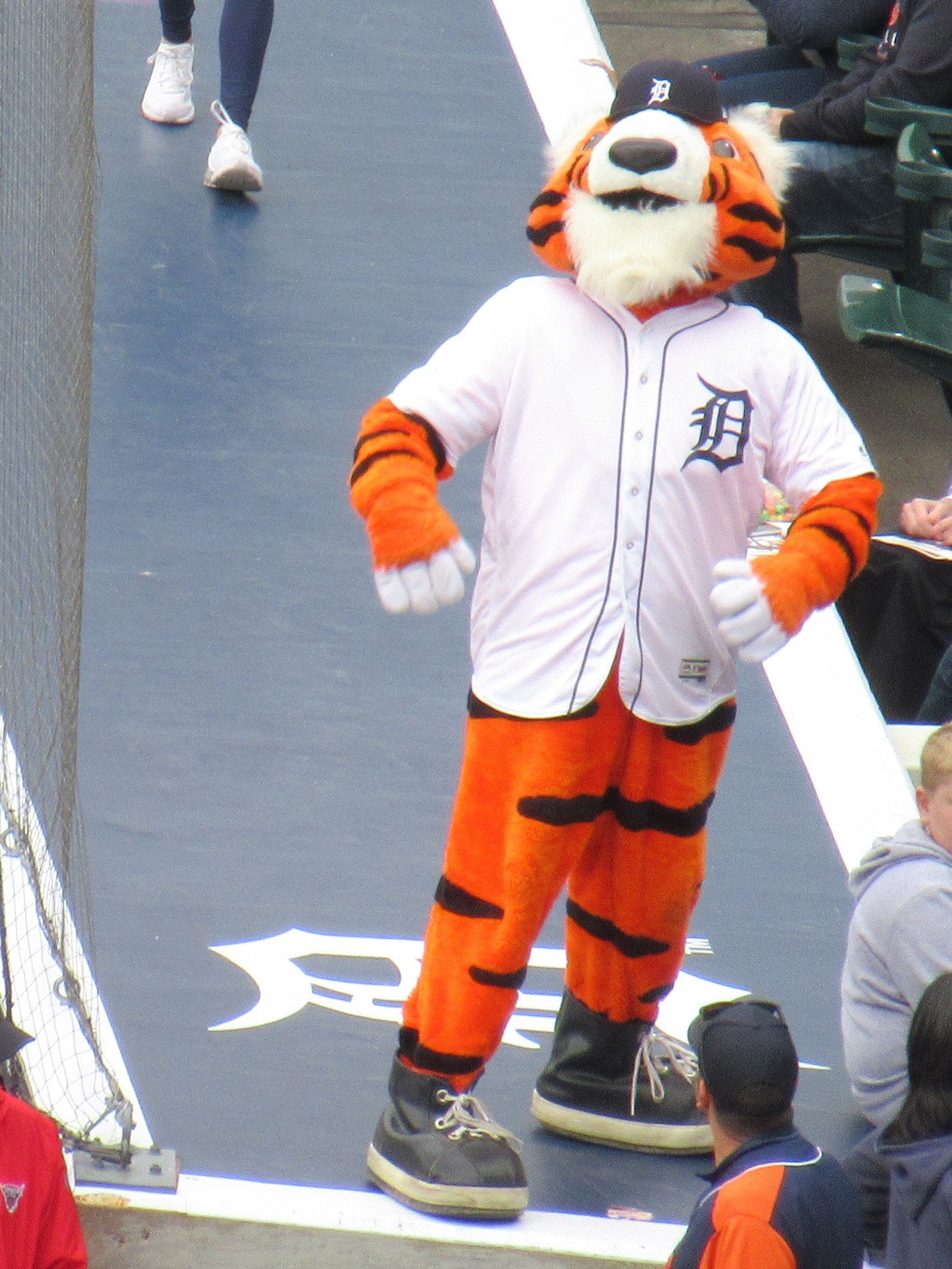
PAWS the tiger

PAWS is the mascot of the Detroit Tigers. PAWS is a bipedal tiger who debuted on May 5, 1995, in Tiger Stadium. PAWS wears a Tigers hat and jersey; in previous years, PAWS' jersey would have the current season's two-digit abbreviation (i.e. '10 for 2010). However, in 2011 and 2016, PAWS' number changed to 00, since the Tigers retired No. 11 and No. 16 in honor of Sparky Anderson and Hal Newhouser, respectively. PAWS' dress changes during Comerica Park theme nights such as a Santa Claus outfit during "Christmas in July" night, or an Elvis Presley-inspired costume for Elvis Night. PAWS "resides" in Comerica Park to this day. As of 2026, PAWS is presented by the Detroit Zoo.

=== Phillie Phanatic (Philadelphia Phillies) ===
The Phillie Phanatic, arguably the most recognizable mascot in all of North American sports

Phillie Phanatic is the official mascot of the Philadelphia Phillies. He is a large, furry, green bi-pedal creature with a cylindrical beak containing a tongue that sticks out. He was created by Harrison/Erickson, who thought that the team needed a mascot similar to The San Diego Chicken. The character is named for the fanatical fans of the team and, according to former team owner Bill Giles, was to bring more families to Veterans Stadium, the Phillies' ballpark at the time, which had become noted for rowdiness and even violence at times. He can be seen riding around on an ATV at home games. In 2008, Forbes named the Phanatic the best mascot in sports.

=== Phoebe Phanatic (Philadelphia Phillies) ===
Phoebe Phanatic is the mother of the Phillie Phanatic, the official mascot of the Philadelphia Phillies. She is a large, furry, green bi-pedal creature with an extendable tongue. Phoebe is brought out on special occasions in Philadelphia, such as games on Mother's Day.

=== Phred (Philadelphia Phillies) ===
Phred is a secondary mascot for the Philadelphia Phillies. He is a furry, green bi-pedal creature with an extendable tongue, who stands about half the height of his more well-known cousin, the Phillie Phanatic. Phred is used only occasionally in Philadelphia.

=== The Pierogis (Pittsburgh Pirates) ===
The Pierogis are a series of seven people dressed in pierogi costumes that race in a promotion between innings during Pittsburgh Pirates baseball games. The contestants in this race include Jalapeño Hannah (green hat), Cheese Chester (yellow), Sauerkraut Saul (red), Oliver Onion (purple), Bacon Burt (orange), Potato Pete (blue), and Pizza Penny (Red and White checkered). The Great Pierogi Race was inspired by the Milwaukee Brewers' Sausage Race.

=== Pirate Parrot (Pittsburgh Pirates) ===
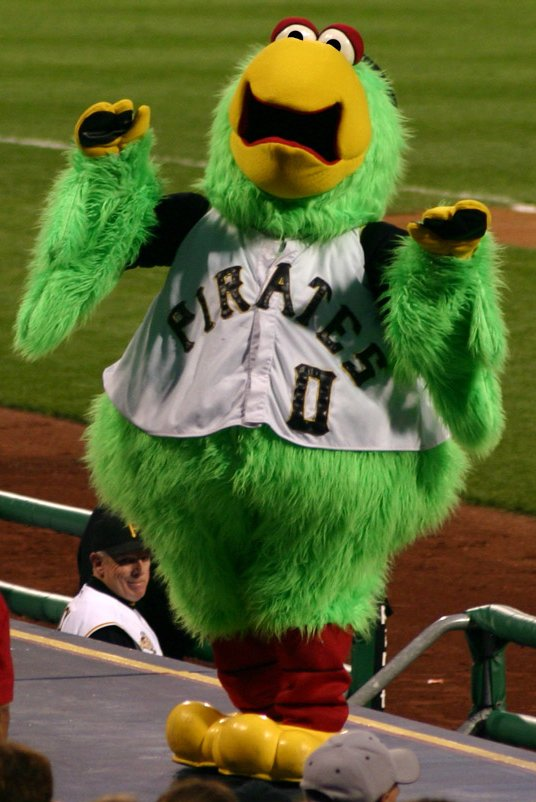
Pirate Parrot in 2006

The Pirate Parrot is the mascot of the Pittsburgh Pirates, debuting in 1979. He is a large green parrot who wears a Pirates jersey and cap. The character of a parrot was derived from the classic story Treasure Island by Robert Louis Stevenson, most notably the one owned by Long John Silver named "Captain Flint". He is often seen dancing on the dugouts and shooting hot-dogs from a cannon, during team home wins he can be seen celebrating waving a Jolly Roger flag.

=== The Racing Presidents (Washington Nationals) ===
The Washington Nationals have a President's Race during their games. The race debuted in 2006, and the four presidents on Mount Rushmore – George Washington ("George"), Thomas Jefferson ("Tom"), Abraham Lincoln ("Abe"), and Theodore Roosevelt ("Teddy") – have raced in every season since. In 2013, a fifth permanent contestant – William Howard Taft ("Will") – was added. A sixth contestant was added in 2015 as part of a three-year marketing deal with the White House Historical Association, with the sixth slot changing annually based on the president featured by the association on its annual Christmas ornament. Calvin Coolidge ("Cal") was the first to fill the sixth slot, making his debut in July 2015. Herbert Hoover ("Herbie") replaced Coolidge for 2016. Each president has a uniform number corresponding to his place in the order in which they held the office (George – 1; Tom – 3; Abe – 16; Teddy – 26; Bill – 27; Cal – 30; Herbie – 31).

The Racing Presidents became an instant success upon their 2006 debut and make multiple public appearances every year. Notably, Abraham Lincoln appeared on the Illinois float for President Barack Obama's first inauguration parade on January 20, 2009.

A running gag with the Racing presidents from 2006 to 2012 was that Teddy could never win a race, although he came close in 2012, after apparently defeating the other three presidents: While he was "Tebowing" near the finish line, George drove up in a car and whacked him in the back of the head with a baseball bat, knocking him out before he could finish the race. In October 2012, however, just before the regular season ended and shortly before the Nationals' first postseason run began, Teddy finally won his first race, and he then went on to win four straight.

The Nationals scrapped plans to replace Herbie in 2017 with the president to be featured on that year's White House Historical Association Christmas ornament. Instead, they announced before the 2017 season that Bill, Cal, and Herbie all had retired to Florida, where in 2017 they began a new series of presidents Races among themselves during Nationals spring training games at FITTEAM Ballpark of the Palm Beaches in West Palm Beach. Meanwhile, the presidents Race at Nationals Park returned in 2017 to its original format of 2006–2012, featuring only George, Tom, Abe, and Teddy.

=== Rally Squirrel (St. Louis Cardinals) ===
Rally Squirrel is a secondary mascot for the St. Louis Cardinals. He is an anthropomorphic squirrel wearing the team's uniform with a number 11 (presumably for the 2011 postseason), and was introduced not long after an actual squirrel appeared on the field at Busch Stadium during the fifth inning of Game 4 of the 2011 National League Division Series. The squirrel ran across home plate as Philadelphia Phillies pitcher Roy Oswalt was delivering a pitch to Skip Schumaker, causing Oswalt to complain to the umpire that he was distracted by the squirrel. The video of the incident became very popular, and several local businesses in the St. Louis area began creating items to capitalize on the phenomenon.

A performer dressed up as Rally Squirrel took part in Cardinals fan rallies beginning with Game 3 of the 2011 National League Championship Series, and was a companion of the existing Cardinals mascot Fredbird during the remainder of the postseason, assisting Fredbird and Team Fredbird with their duties entertaining the Cardinals fans at Busch Stadium.

=== Rangers Captain (Texas Rangers) ===
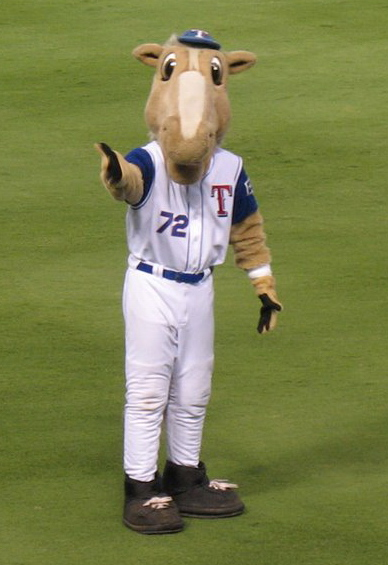
Rangers Captain is the mascot of the Texas Rangers.

Rangers Captain is the mascot for the Texas Rangers. Introduced in 2002, he is a palomino horse, dressed in the team's uniform and cap. He wears the uniform number "72" in honor of 1972, the year the Rangers relocated to the Dallas/Fort Worth Metroplex, on the back.

Rangers Captain has multiple uniforms to match each of the variants the team has; his chosen uniform for the game matches the uniform choice made by the team for that particular game. However, his outfit sometimes matches a theme the team is promoting; as an example, on April 24, 2010, he dressed up like Elvis Presley as part of an Elvis theme promotional night.

=== Raymond (Tampa Bay Rays) ===
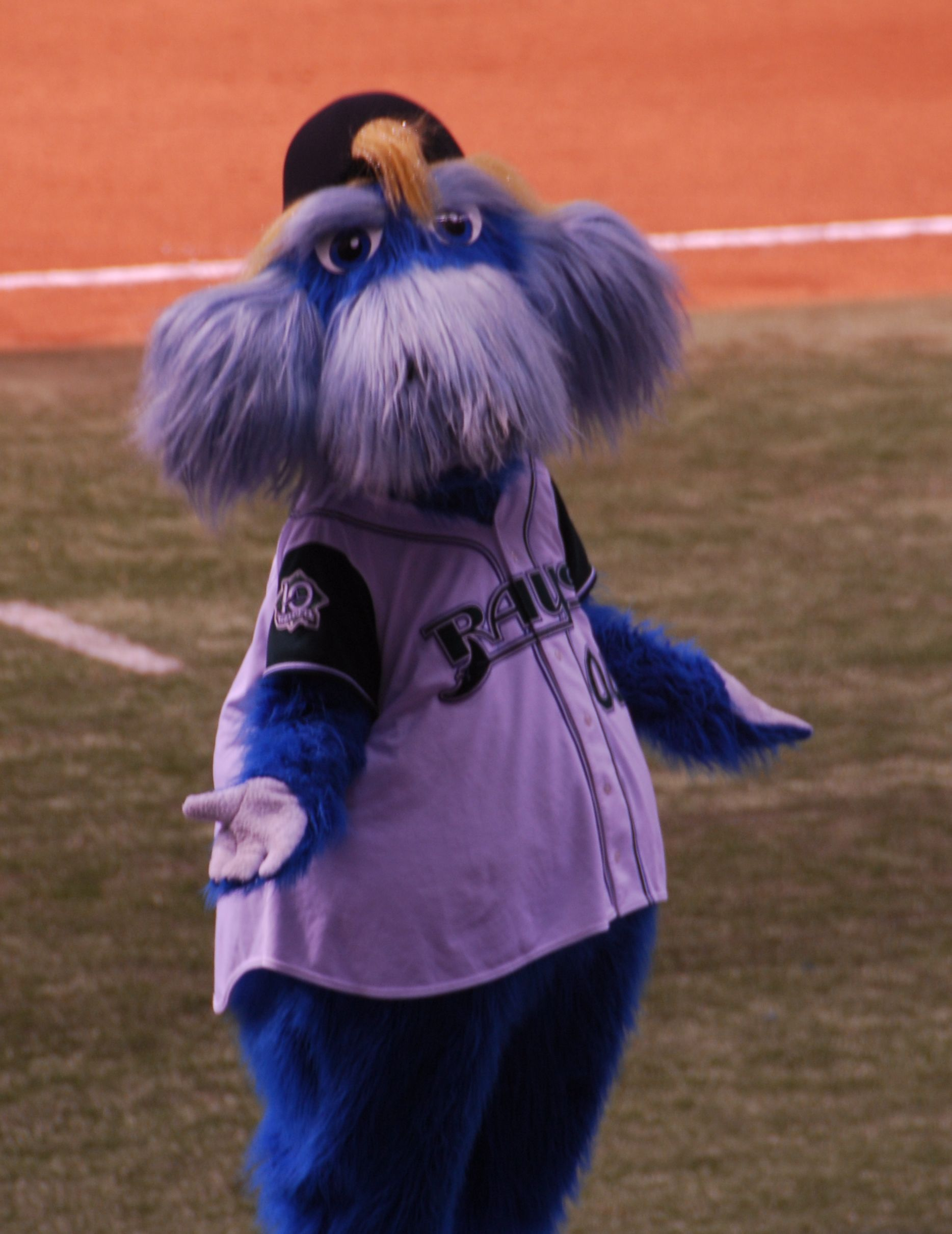
Raymond, the Tampa Bay Rays mascot in September 2007

Raymond is the original team mascot of the Tampa Bay Rays and one of the team's three official mascots. Raymond is a furry blue creature wearing a large pair of sneakers and a backward baseball cap, completed with a Rays jersey. He is described officially as a "seadog", having been born somewhere in the Gulf of Mexico. He is said to reside in a private condominium inside Tropicana Field. Raymond was awarded an honorable mention in the GameOps.com Best Mascot contest for 2006.

=== Rosie Red (Cincinnati Reds) ===
Rosie Red is the female mascot of the Cincinnati Reds. She wears the jersey and cap similar to her partners, but with a skirt. Rosie was introduced in August 2008 as the new companion of Gapper and Mr. Redlegs, and her name is derived from a female fan group, the "Rosie Reds," founded to prevent the team from moving from Cincinnati in 1963. (The official group name comes from the acronym of "Rooters Organized to Stimulate Interest and Enthusiasm in the Cincinnati Reds".)

=== The Salmon Run (Seattle Mariners) ===
During Opening Day 2024, the Seattle Mariners unveiled their first mascot race, The Salmon Run, presented by Microsoft. This race consists of four species of salmon - King, Sockeye, Silver, and Humpy. This run is a way to honor the maritime and riverine natural heritage of the Seattle area and is also the first one of its kind in the Western USA.

=== The Sausages (Milwaukee Brewers) ===
The sausages are unofficial mascots of the Milwaukee Brewers. They are stylized in the appearance of sausages from around the world. When they were debuted in the mid-1990s there were only three: The German Bratwurst, The Polish Kielbasa, and The Italian Sausage. In the late 1990s The Hot Dog became a racer. In 2006 a fifth sausage was debuted, The Spanish Chorizo. They are a favorite of fans and make sports highlights reels occasionally.

=== Screech (Washington Nationals) ===
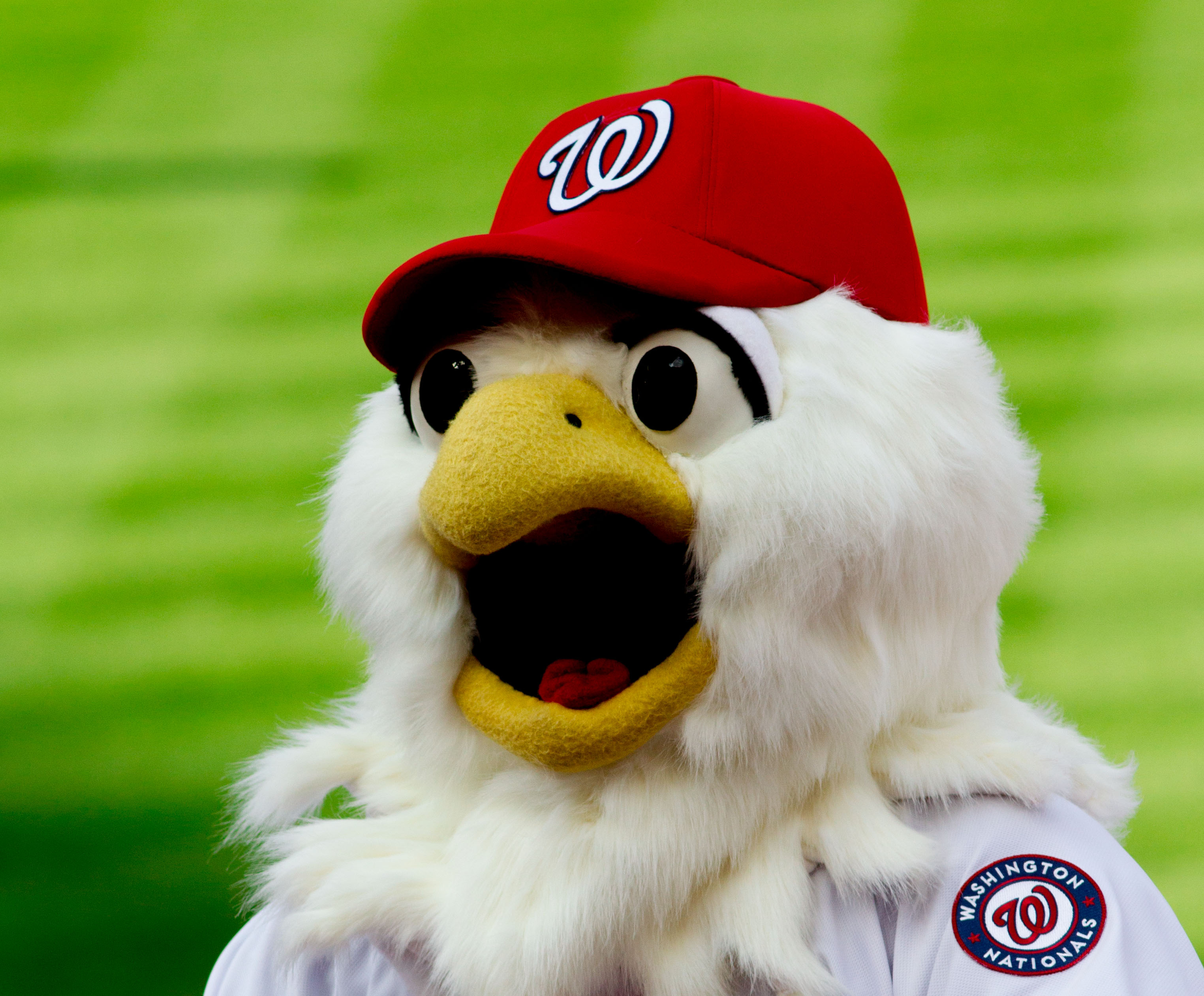
Screech in 2012

Screech is the mascot of the Washington Nationals. He is a bald eagle who wears the home cap and jersey of the team. He was "hatched" on April 17, 2005 at the "Kids Opening Day" promotion at Robert F. Kennedy Memorial Stadium. A nine-year-old fourth grade student in Washington, Glenda Gutierrez, designed the mascot and won a contest sponsored by the team, explaining that it was "strong and eats almost everything". A new "matured" edition of the mascot was unveiled March 2, 2009. The Springfield Falcons, which played in the American Hockey League until they moved to Tucson in 2016, also had a mascot named Screech.

=== Slider (Cleveland Guardians) ===
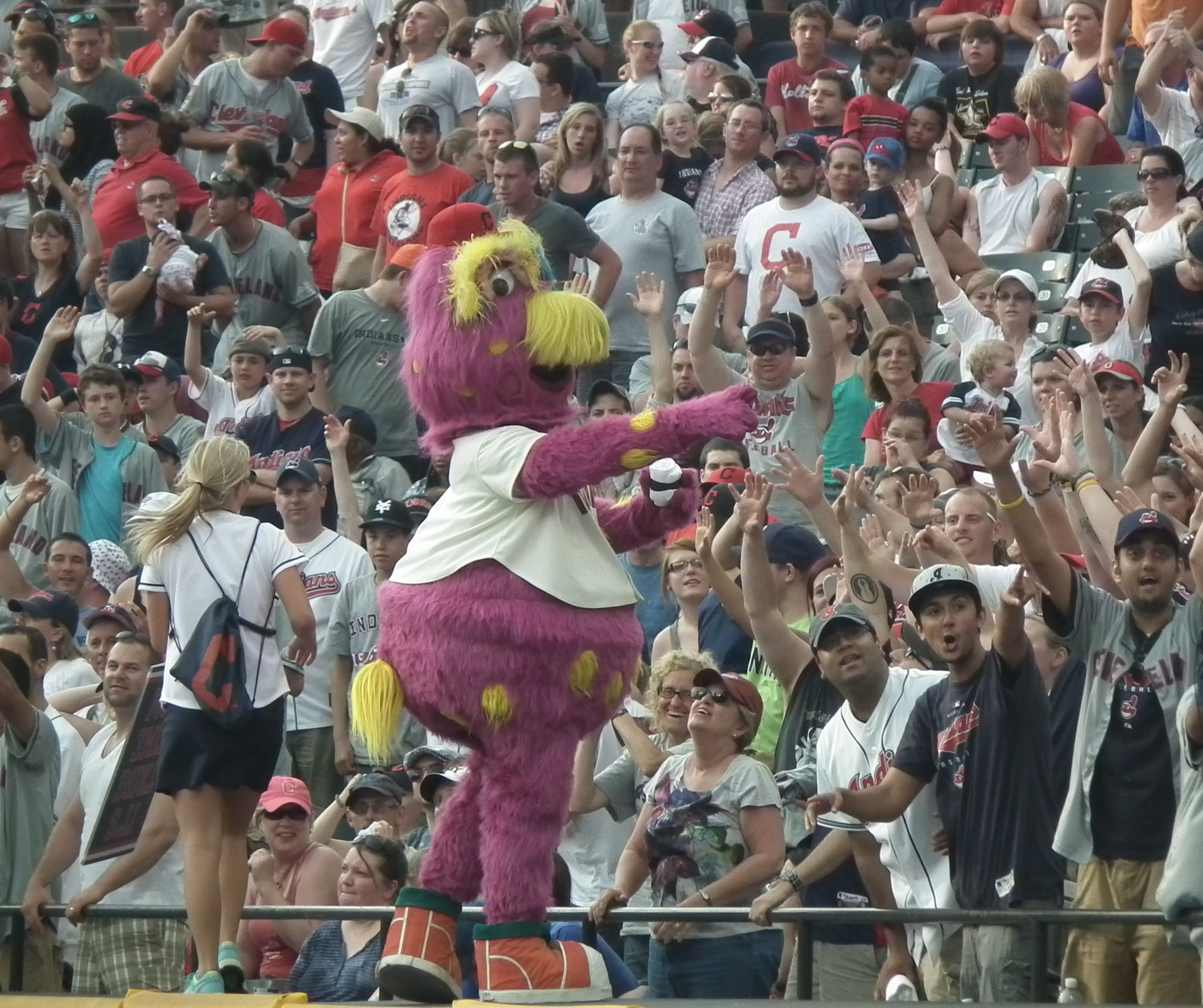
Slider

Slider is the mascot for the Cleveland Guardians. He is a large, furry fuchsia-colored creature. He has a large yellow nose and shaggy yellow eyebrows. He was created in 1990, inspired by the Phillie Phanatic. He was best known for an injury during the 1995 American League Championship Series when he fell six feet off an outfield wall and tore knee ligaments. He was inducted into the Mascot Hall of Fame in 2008.

=== Sluggerrr (Kansas City Royals) ===
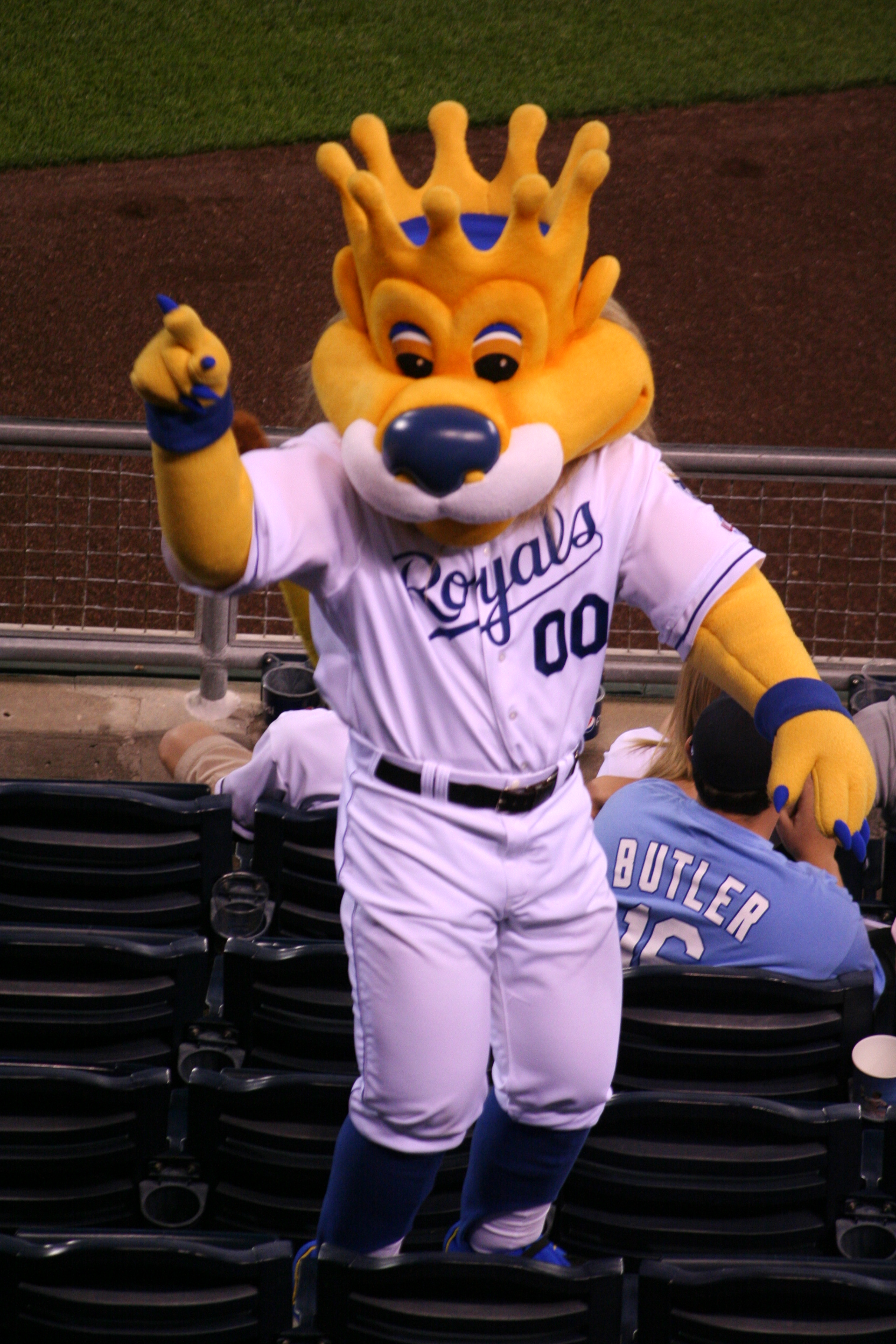
Sluggerrr is the mascot of the Kansas City Royals.

Sluggerrr is the official mascot of the Kansas City Royals. The 6'9" King of the Jungle, created by character designer Tom Sapp of Real Characters, Inc., made his debut on April 5, 1996. His name is based on the word slugger, which refers to a powerful batter with a high percentage of extra base hits. Sluggerrr is one of few mascots that has Facebook and X accounts, both clearly marked on his homepage.

In 2009, a spectator was injured by a hot dog thrown into the stands by Sluggerrr as part of a between-innings promotion. The spectator sued the Royals organization, claiming that they had been negligent. A jury found for the team under the Baseball Rule, which limits spectators' ability to sue teams for injuries arising from gameplay, but the Missouri Supreme Court reversed that decision, holding that a mascot's hot dog toss is not an essential part of baseball. On retrial, a new jury found that neither the team nor the fan were at fault, and awarded no damages.

In 2017, Sluggerrr was inducted into the Mascot Hall of Fame.

=== Southpaw (Chicago White Sox) ===
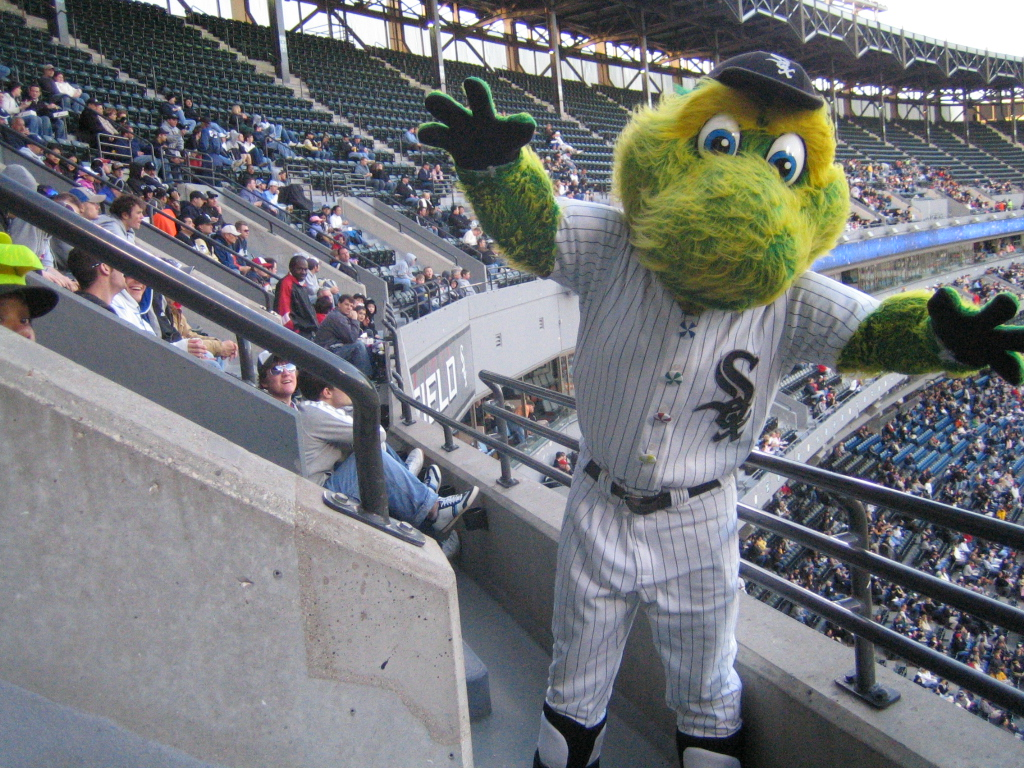
Southpaw, the mascot of the Chicago White Sox

Southpaw is the mascot of the Chicago White Sox. His name is a reference to a left-hand pitcher and is also a reference to Chicago's South Side, where the team plays. He was on a float for Illinois at Barack Obama's inauguration, along with the Washington Nationals racing president representation of Abraham Lincoln. Wearing the team's classic or regular uniforms with the cap, he is present in activities within southern Chicago primarily and in other parts of the city.

=== Stinger (Tampa Bay Rays) ===
Stinger is one of the mascots of the Tampa Bay Rays. Stinger is a cow-nosed stingray who is most often seen on Sundays. Stinger is described as the designated greeter for the Ray Tank, the stadium's stingray touch tank experience. Stinger became an official mascot for the Rays in 2014, joining Raymond and DJ Kitty.

=== Stomper (Athletics) ===
Stomper is the mascot of the Athletics. Created in 1997, he is an elephant who wears an A's uniform adorned with the number 00. Stomper has performed at several All-Star Games and has appeared in a public service announcement discouraging the use of chewing tobacco.

The use of an elephant to symbolize the A's dates back to the early years of the franchise, when a group of Philadelphia businessmen, headed by sporting goods executive Benjamin Shibe, became the team's first owners. When asked to comment, John McGraw, manager of the New York Giants of the rival National League, said something to the effect that "Shibe had bought himself a white elephant." In response, A's manager (and future owner) Connie Mack selected the elephant as the team symbol and mascot. From time to time an illustration of an elephant has been featured on the Athletics uniform, from 1988 until 2024.

=== Swinging Friar (San Diego Padres) ===
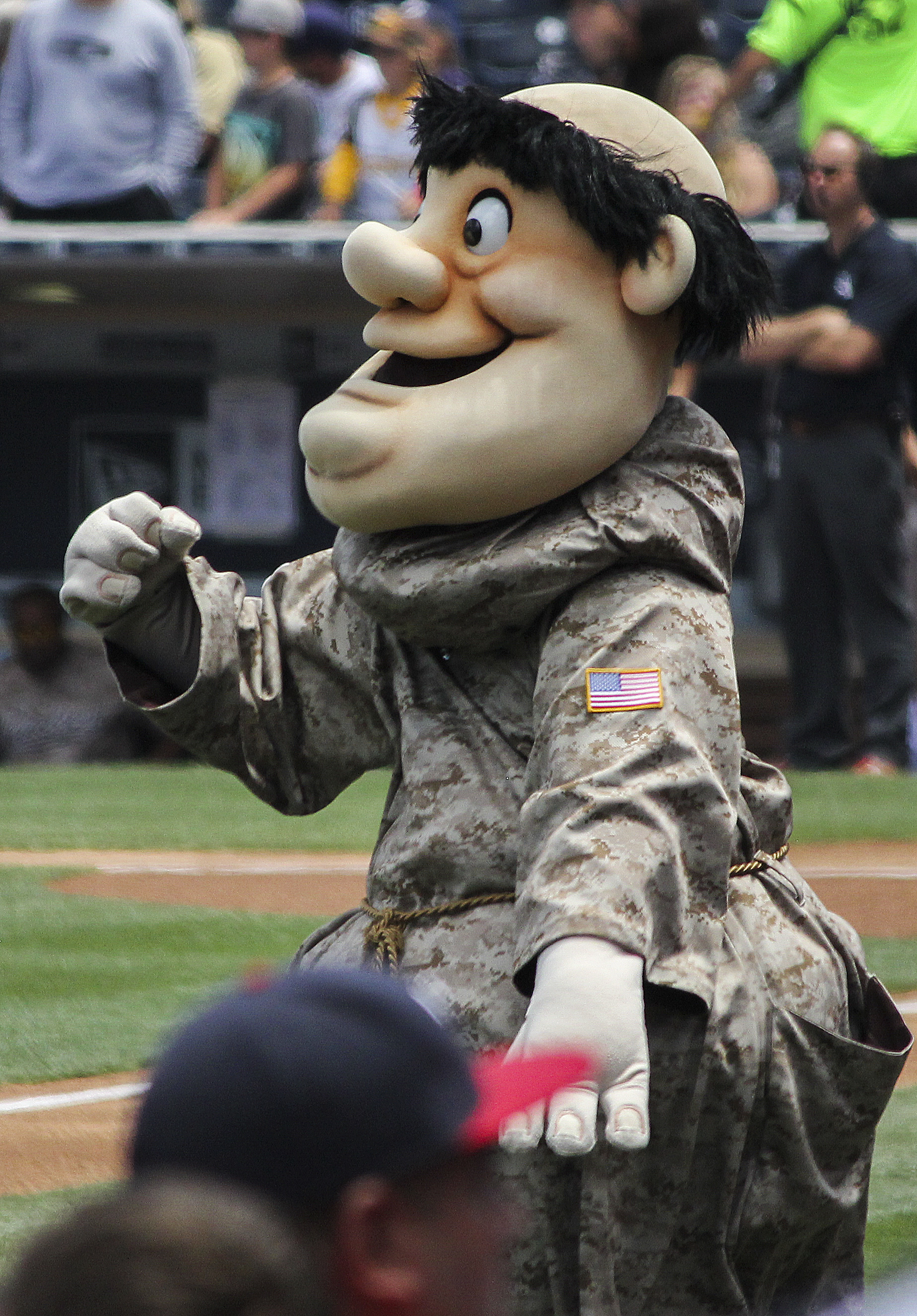
The Swinging Friar is the mascot for the San Diego Padres.

The Swinging Friar is the mascot of the San Diego Padres.

The Swinging Friar has been a mascot with the team as early as 1958, when the Padres were still a member of the Pacific Coast League, a Minor League Baseball organization. He was named after the Spanish Franciscan friars, who founded Mission San Diego de Alcalá, around which the city of San Diego began to emerge in the 18th century. The Padres joined Major League Baseball in 1969 and kept the popular mascot. He was even on the team emblem until 1984. Wanting a more "professional" image, the owners introduced a more corporate logo. In 1996, he was brought back as a sleeve patch for the club's blue alternate jerseys, and though the team has changed its logo and colors since then, the Friar remains there to this day.

The Swinging Friar is a cartoon-like character, pudgy, balding, and always smiling. He is dressed as a friar with a tonsure, sandals, a dark hooded cloak, and a rope around the waist. He swings a baseball bat; but reportedly, in some years he swings left-handed, in other years he swings right-handed, he may be ambidextrous, or even a switch hitter. On home game Sundays, the Friar wears a special camouflage cloak as the team honors the military background of San Diego with similar uniforms. The Friar also rings a mission bell at home games immediately after a win.

Originally, The Swinging Friar was represented at the ballpark as a real man wearing a friar outfit. Since his return, the character has been a full mascot costume.

Some in the past have confused the San Diego Chicken as the mascot of the Padres. Although he does make appearances occasionally at San Diego sporting events, he has never been the official mascot of any San Diego sports team.

As of 2019, the Friar is also active with his own X account, which debuted just days after the team's decision to readopt the classic brown and gold uniform colors for 2020 and beyond.

=== T. C. Bear (Minnesota Twins) ===
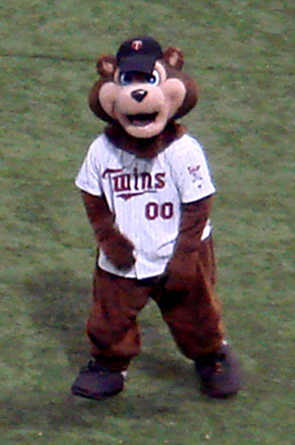
T.C. Bear, the mascot of the Minnesota Twins

T. C. is the mascot for the Minnesota Twins. He was first introduced to Minnesota on April 3, 2000. T. C. is loosely modeled after the Hamm's Beer Bear, a mascot used in advertisements for Hamm's Brewery, an early sponsor for the Twins. The "T. C." stands for the "Twin Cities", Minneapolis and St. Paul. Prior to T.C., the mascot for the Minnesota Twins 1980–81 was a loon named "Twinkie". T.C. can be seen wearing the team home main or alternate uniform with the TC mark on his cap, just like the rest of the team.

=== Wally and Tessie the Green Monsters (Boston Red Sox) ===
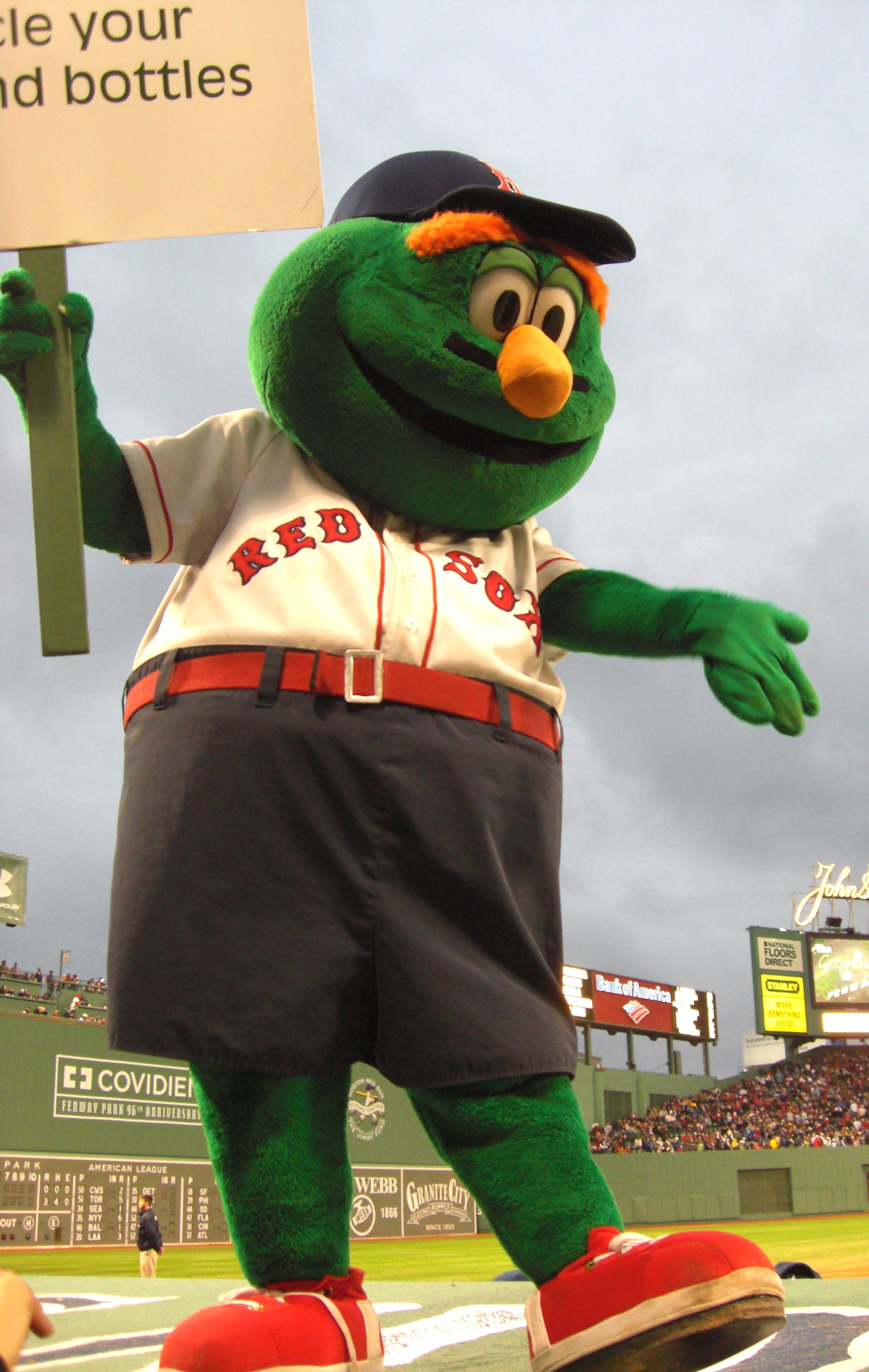
Wally the Green Monster

Wally the Green Monster is the official mascot for the Boston Red Sox. His name is derived from the Green Monster nickname of the 37-foot (11 m) wall in left field at Fenway Park. Wally debuted in 1997 to the chagrin of many older Red Sox fans, despite his popularity with children.

According to the Red Sox promotions department, Wally was a huge Red Sox fan who, in 1947, decided to move inside the left field wall of Fenway Park, since it "eats up" hits that would easily be home runs at other parks. Apparently, he was very shy and lived the life of a hermit for 50 years. In 1997, on the 50th anniversary of the Green Monster being painted green, he came out of the manual scoreboard and has been interacting with players and fans ever since.

When the team began to grow out their beards as a trademark during their 2013 World Series run, Wally was given a long beard as well.

In January 2016, the Red Sox unveiled a new mascot named Tessie, Wally the Green Monster's little sister. Tessie is named after the song "Tessie", which has long been associated with the Red Sox. Tessie wears a blue shirt with the large letter B in red - the symbol utilized in the team's caps, which they both wear.

== Former mascots ==
This is a list of former Major League Baseball mascots. Some of these mascots may still be used, but are not considered "official" mascots.

=== Astrojack and Astrodillo ===
Astrojack, an anthropomorphic rabbit, and Astrodillo, an anthropomorphic armadillo, were mascots for the Houston Astros in the 1980s. They wore the Astros' "rainbow" uniforms of that time, and were also the team's first mascots to circulate through the crowd. Before games and during breaks between innings, they would also race around the field on three-wheelers and perform skits with the Astrodome's house band, The Astronuts. The creator of Astrojack and Astrodillo, Logan Goodson, would go on to create a later Astros mascot, Junction Jack, who initially replaced the current Astros mascot, Orbit.

=== BJ Birdy ===
BJ Birdy served as the official mascot for the Toronto Blue Jays from 1979 to 1999. He was ejected from a game in 1993 for "showing up" the umpire, after making gestures the umpire found offensive. He was replaced in 1999 with Ace and Diamond. BJ was created and played by the same person, Kevin Shanahan, for his entire 20-year career as the Jays' mascot. Shanahan lost three toes on his left foot in an automobile accident during the 1991 off season, but managed to return as the Jays mascot, missing only the first home game of the season.

=== Bleacher Creature ===
The Bleacher Creature was a mascot for the Atlanta Braves major league baseball team during the late 1970s. It featured green shaggy fur with a Braves cap and logo on top. The word Braves was written across its chest in big red letters. It had a permanent toothless smile. The mascot usually roamed the stands from time to time during home games and was intended more for the entertainment of younger fans.

The mascot was costumed by Alan Stensland, then a student at Georgia Tech. Stensland was working as an usher at Atlanta Fulton County Stadium when he was approached to wear the costume. The outfit required someone who was 5"8" to 5'10" tall, and Alen met the height and shoe size requirements. Alen recalls having one of his costume's eyes removed by a youngster on his first night out. They also attempted to bust his kneecaps on bat night. During the 1977 season, the mascot made some 250 appearances at games, parties, and parades.

Stensland was only 18 at the time he first donned the costume. The most intense problem he had was the heat. With the added humidity, a really "funky smell" permeated the inside of the costume. Once Stensland graduated, he left the Braves organization, and the mascot was discontinued. The other Braves mascot, Chief Noc-A-Homa, continued on for several more years until Homer the Brave took its spot. Starting in 2018, Blooper took over the current mascot of the Braves.

=== Bluepper ===
Bluepper was a former mascot for the San Diego Padres from 1992 to 1994, He was a dark blue dog-like character with a baseball nose and a sun visor, he was later retired in 1994 because of his unpopularity. The Swinging Friar serves as the current mascot of the Padres.

=== Bonnie Brewer ===
Bonnie Brewer is a former official mascot for the Milwaukee Brewers, appearing at Milwaukee County Stadium from 1973 to 1979. Bonnie was portrayed as a young blonde woman in a gold blouse and short blue lederhosen, wearing a baseball cap and frequently carrying a blue-and-gold broom which she would use to sweep the bases.

Bonnie was first introduced as the female companion to the Brewers' mascot Bernie Brewer. Bernie and Bonnie were created by then-team vice president Dick Hackett as part of an effort to create a lively atmosphere at County Stadium, which also included hiring organist Frank Charles to play a Wurlitzer during the games. As Hackett remembers it, Bernie and Bonnie were added over the objections of team owner Bud Selig.

Bonnie was noted mainly for her colorful antics during the seventh-inning stretch. As the grounds crew swept the infield, Bonnie wielded her signature broom, sweeping off each base in turn. After sweeping third base, she would playfully swat the opposing team's third-base coach on the backside with her broom, following it up with a kiss on his cheek.

Bonnie was discontinued after the 1979 season, although no clear reason has ever been given for her "firing". Bernie Brewer was discontinued as a mascot in 1984, although he was brought back as a costumed mascot in 1993, complete with full-body costume and large foam head. Bonnie Brewer returned as part of the nostalgia-heavy final home stand at County Stadium, September 18–28, 2000. As of 2008, Bonnie is part of the Brewers' "Retro Fridays" promotions at Miller Park, incorporating the traditional base sweeping as well as dancing with Bernie on Bernie's Dugout during the fans' singing of the "Beer Barrel Polka" in the seventh inning stretch.

=== The Buccaneer ===
The Buccaneer was a secondary mascot used by the Pittsburgh Pirates baseball club during their 1995 season. While the team's primary mascot, the Pirate Parrot, wore an elaborate costume with a prosthetic head and molded frame, the Buccaneer was simply a man in pirate's garb who led the crowd in organized cheers. After an audition involving 30 prospective mascots, 23-year-old Tim Beggy was chosen to portray the Buccaneer.

Beggy was arrested along with a woman in July 1995, while skinny dipping after hours in a closed public swimming pool. Beggy and the woman both reached a plea agreement, under which they each paid a $100 fine and court costs in exchange for more serious charges of "open lewdness" being dropped. Beggy's arrest attracted national attention, including jokes on The Tonight Show, and the Pirates subsequently discontinued the use of the character in the wake of the negative publicity.

=== Charlie-O ===
Charlie-O the Mule was the mascot used by the Kansas City Athletics and Oakland A's from 1963 to 1976. The mule was named after their colorful owner at that time, Charles O. Finley.

When the A's moved to Missouri, where the official state animal is the mule, Warren Hearnes gave a mule to Finley for his barnyard menagerie at Municipal Stadium which also include sheep and goats that scampered up the hill behind right field. The Municipal Stadium menagerie also included Warpaint, the horse mascot of the Kansas City Chiefs. As questions swirled about whether Finley would be loyal to Missouri, he embraced the mule and removed the elephant from the A's logo and changed the A's colors from blue, red and white to green, gold, and white.

Finley took the sorrel 5-foot-tall (1.5 m) mule around the country, walking him into cocktail parties and hotel lobbies, and on one occasion even into the press room after a large feeding to annoy reporters.

=== Chester Charge ===
In April 1977 the Houston Astros introduced their very first mascot, Chester Charge. Chester Charge was a 45-pound costume of a cartoon Texas cavalry soldier on a horse. Chester appeared on the field at the beginning of each home game, during the seventh inning stretch and then ran around the bases at the conclusion of each win. At the blast of a bugle, the scoreboard would light up and the audience would yell, "Charge!" The first Chester Charge was played by Steve Ross who was then an 18-year-old Senior High School student. The creation of Chester Charge and the (incredible for its day) scoreboard graphics were created by Ed Henderson.

=== Chief Noc-A-Homa ===
Chief Noc-A-Homa was the original mascot of the Atlanta Braves from the 1950s until 1986. The name was used for the "laughing Indian" sleeve patch worn on Braves jerseys. From at least the early 1960s, while still in Milwaukee County Stadium, until the early 1980s at Atlanta's Fulton County Stadium, this mascot "lived" in a teepee in an unoccupied section of the bleacher seats.

The teepee was involved in a bit of controversy in 1982 when the Braves, who were in first place in the National League West at the time, elected to remove the chief's home to provide more seating for the fans. The team dropped out of first when they lost 19 of 21 games after the removal. The teepee was returned to its spot and the team won the division.

Opposition to Native American mascots caused the Braves to retire Chief Noc-A-Homa and eventually replace him with Homer the Brave, who was eventually replaced with Blooper in 2018.

=== Crazy Crab ===
The Crazy Crab was a mascot of the San Francisco Giants for the 1984 season. As opposed to other mascots, Crazy Crab was meant as an "anti-mascot", satirizing the mascot craze occurring at the time. Fans were encouraged to boo the mascot, played by actor Wayne Doba, and manager Frank Robinson appeared in a commercial with the crustacean where Robinson was restrained from attacking him. This encouragement perhaps led to animosity toward the mascot, as Giants fans regularly threw various dangerous objects at Crazy Crab, including beer bottles and batteries, and Crazy Crab's suit had to be reinforced with a fiberglass shell for protection. Additionally, players on both the Giants and opposing teams would throw rosin bags and other objects at the mascot. Doba sued the San Diego Padres after two of their players, Kurt Bevacqua and future Giants manager Bruce Bochy, tackled him, causing injuries. The mascot lasted only one year and the Giants would not have another mascot until Lou Seal in 1996. The crab returned in 1999 for the Giants' final game at Candlestick Park, and a bobblehead with its likeness was given away on July 18, 2008, in celebration of the franchise's fiftieth anniversary in the Bay Area. A website called "Rehab the Crab" is devoted to bringing back Crazy Crab, and a Crazy Crab sandwich is sold at Oracle Park, the Giants' current stadium. In 2014, Colin Hanks directed The Anti-Mascot, an ESPN 30 for 30 short about Crazy Crab. On July 7, 2018, Crazy Crab made an appearance at Oracle Park in honor of the Giants' Crazy Crab scarf giveaway. He also showed an appearance on July 27, 2025, in honor of Lou Seal's Mascot Hall of Fame induction ceremony. He was there alongside his parents, Lou Seal Sr. and Louise Seal, the Phillie Phanatic, Mr. Met, and S.J. Sharkie.

=== Dandy ===
Dandy was a short-lived mascot of the New York Yankees. He was a large pinstriped cartoon mascot that sported a Yankees hat. He had a mustache that gave him an appearance similar to that of former Yankee pitcher Sparky Lyle or Thurman Munson. His name was a play on the classic American folk song "Yankee Doodle Dandy". He appeared at the start of the 1980 season and was so unpopular that he was quickly canceled. Dandy was beaten up by fans who did not want a mascot, and quit, leading to the elimination of the character as the Yankees chose not to replace him. The retirement was also due to Munson's death in a plane crash, due to the mascot's similar appearance to him.

Along with this experiment, the Yankees briefly had mascots resembling ballpark food (plus Yankees hats on top) during the mid-1990s. Outside of these two occasions, the Yankees have not had an official mascot or cheerleading squad roam the stands or perform on the field, although the late Freddy Schuman has served as an unofficial promoter in the stands for decades, and a squirrel appearing on the field has brought inspiration as a mascot for the team. In 2021, Bronxie the Rally Turtle served as the Yankees' unofficial mascot.

=== Diamond ===
Diamond was a secondary mascot of the Toronto Blue Jays alongside Ace. She and Ace replaced BJ Birdy in 2000. However, Diamond never gained enough appeal with fans to last, and was removed by the Blue Jays at the end of the 2003 season, leaving Ace the sole mascot of the team.

=== General Admission ===
General Admission (a pun on the unreserved $4 seating section of the Astrodome) was a mascot for the Houston Astros in the mid-to-late 1990s. He was played by Michael Kenny, who is now the Senior Director of Guest Relations for the Houston Astros, and wore a traditional U.S. Cavalry uniform complete with gold stars he would affix to his uniform for every Astros home run hit in the dome. Whenever an Astro hit a home run, General Admission would fire a cannon from his outfield platform (that would often scare those seated near him). He was "killed off" at the end of the 1999 season when the Astros main mascot, Orbit, had him zapped by an alien ray gun on the penultimate game of the regular season.

=== Harry Elephante ===
Harry Elephante was the Oakland Athletics original costumed mascot who debuted sometime in 1980s and was quickly replaced with Trunk, who was eventually replaced with Stomper. His name is a play on Harry Belafonte.

=== Homer ===
Homer was the mascot of the Atlanta Braves. He had a baseball shaped head, and looked a little like Mr. Met. Before having the baseball head however, Homer was the personification of the old "Screaming Warrior" logo the Braves used before dropping it in 1988.

Homer's full name was Homer the Brave. This was meant to sound like "home of the brave", the last words of the national anthem. Incidentally, "homer" was also the longtime nickname for a home run.

Homer retired in 2018 after Blooper was introduced.

=== Homer the Beagle ===
Homer the Beagle was the mascot of the New York Mets in their inaugural year. He was a live beagle puppy. Homer was supposed to run the bases to celebrate the Mets' home run. During his first live test, he rounded first and second base, caught a hot dog scent, and bolted straight into center field. It required three fielders, two ushers, and his handler to catch him. Manager Casey Stengel hated the dog and banned him from the dugout. Homer was fired just like that.

=== Junction Jack ===
Junction Jack was the mascot character for the Houston Astros from 2000 until 2012. He was a 7-foot-tall (2.1 m) rabbit dressed as a railroad engineer. His "relatives" were Junction Julie and Junction Jesse, although they were not certified official mascots by the Astros.

Junction Jack replaced Orbit when the team moved from the Astrodome to Minute Maid Park. The new stadium was originally called "The Ballpark at Union Station" because it was built on the site of the historic railway station in downtown Houston. In keeping with this new theme for the Astros, Orbit was replaced by the engineer. The character was designed by Logan Goodson and named by Duone Byars, both former Astros employees.

After the 2012 season, Junction Jack, Julie, and Jesse were retired, with Orbit returning to his former place as the Astros mascot on November 2, 2012. Orbit's return coincided with the Astros' move to the American League West as well as their new uniforms, caps, and logo.

=== Larry ===
Larry, a Bull Terrier, was the mascot for the Cleveland Naps in the 1910s, cared for by player Jack Graney.

=== Lefty and Righty (Boston Red Sox) ===
Before their retirement in 2014, Lefty and Righty were each a large, red sock with arms, and before Tessie the Green Monster's introduction in 2016, were the alternate mascot characters for the Boston Red Sox through the 2014 MLB season, joining Wally the Green Monster. They were seen on large outings with Wally such as the 2007 World Series Parade as well as weekend afternoon games at Fenway Park.

=== Mettle the Mule ===
Mettle the Mule was a mascot of the New York Mets for a short time starting in 1976. Originally named Arthur, Mettle was renamed as a result of a fan contest. Mettle was kept in a pen near the Mets' bullpen in the right field of Shea Stadium.

=== Mr. Oriole ===
Mr. Oriole was the original Baltimore Orioles mascot in 1954. Commissioned by Orioles Public Relations Director Dick Armstrong to "replicate the expression and appearance of Mr. Oriole" designed by Baltimore Sun cartoonist Jim Hartzell, a costumed mascot was created "so that a three-dimension version of the bird could cavort on the field and in the stands during the games." Mr. Oriole holds the distinction of being the first costumed mascot in Major League Baseball.

=== Philadelphia Phil and Philadelphia Phillis ===
Philadelphia Phil and Philadelphia Phillis served as mascots for the Phillies during the 1970s (1971–1979). Their costumes invoked the city's revolutionary spirit from 1776. The pair reappeared with their replacement—the Phanatic—as the Phillies celebrated their final year at Veterans Stadium in 2003, including the final opening day and final game.

=== Rally ===
Rally was one of the Atlanta Braves mascots. He was a Red and Blue Muppet-like mascot with a Blue Mowhawk, he first appeared during the 1985–1986 season, and would often be seen hanging out with Homer. He soon disappeared sometime in the early 2000's, leaving Homer the only mascot until Blooper arrived in 2018.

=== Ribbie and Roobarb ===
Ribbie and Roobarb were a pair of mascots used by the Chicago White Sox from 1981 to 1988 at Comiskey Park. After the Sox were sold in 1981 by Bill Veeck to an ownership group headed by Jerry Reinsdorf and Eddie Einhorn, the new owners, who were eager to draw on the 1970s popularity of such mascots as The San Diego Chicken, hired the design firm responsible for creating the Phillie Phanatic to create a new mascot for the Sox.

They debuted the pair of furry mascots in September 1981, but the fans never accepted the two, ridiculing them throughout their tenure with the team—both because of their ludicrous appearance, which had no apparent connection with the team, and also because they were seen as an attempt to eliminate Andy the Clown, who had performed unofficially at Sox games since 1960. "Rhubarb" is longtime baseball slang for a heated on-field argument; Ribbie comes from the acronym RBI, for runs batted in. Often reports will say ribbie instead of RBI to describe it.

For most of the 1980s, the patrons at Comiskey Park ... were asked to endure the 'antics' of baseball's least appealing mascots, Ribbie and Roobarb. One looked like the dim-witted son of Oscar the Grouch, the other like a chartreuse anteater with a genetic flaw.

After another failed mascot in the early 1990s was Waldo the White Sox Wolf. The White Sox introduced a new mascot, Southpaw, in 2004.

=== Ribbie and Southpaw ===
Ribbie and Southpaw were a pair of bear mascots created by the Los Angeles Angels. When the Walt Disney Company bought the Angels from Gene Autry, new management didn't care for the duo. In May 1996, they were unceremoniously banished from the dugouts and relegated to "pregame meet and greets" in the parking lot. In June 1997, they officially retired them and replaced them with Scoop and Clutch, which didn't last long either.

=== Rootin' Tootin' Ranger ===
Rootin' Tootin' Ranger was the mascot of the Texas Rangers in the late 1970s. Since 2002, Rangers Captain serves as the team's mascot.

=== Schottzie ===
Schottzie was a live St. Bernard mascot used by the Cincinnati Reds from 1982 until his death in 1991, he was later replaced by another St. Bernard named Schottzie (02), who was mascot from 1992 until 1999.

=== Scoop and Clutch ===
Scoop and Clutch were mascots for the Anaheim Angels in the 1990s. The pair were bears wearing Angels uniforms complete with halos and wings for some time. They disappeared and were effectively replaced by the Rally Monkey in the 2002 season.

=== Souki ===
Souki was the mascot of the Montreal Expos, for only one season (1978), a figure in an Expos uniform with a giant baseball for a head. It was a variation of the popular mascot of the New York Mets called Mr. Met, but with one difference. The Expos' Mr. Met, called Souki, had odd antennas sticking out the sides of his head. He looked like something from outer space and the kids were afraid of him. During a game in late fall, a father attacked Souki after his child was afraid of him (and after a loss). Starting the following year in 1979, Youppi! took over as the official mascot of the Expos until the team's relocation to Washington, D.C. in 2004, where he was replaced with Screech the following year.

=== Spacey the Needle ===
Spacey was the winner of the 1979 mascot competition held by the Seattle Mariners and became the team mascot for a few games. The Mariners replaced him with the Mariner Moose in 1990.

=== The Baseball Bug ===
The Baseball Bug was the former mascot of the Cleveland Indians from 1980 to 1981. He was a large red creature with a long nose and a baseball cap with eyes and antennas sticking out. He was retired and replaced with Slider after the 1981 season. He came out of retirement in 2024 to join the Cleveland Guardians’ High-A Midwest League affiliate, the Lake County Captains.

=== Trunk ===
Trunk was the former mascot of the Oakland Athletics from 1994 to 1996. he was an elephant similar to Stomper, but was skinnier and wore black sunglasses similar to the alternate logo used from 1994 to 2002. He was replaced by Stomper later on in the 1997 season.

=== Twinkie the Loon ===
Twinkie was used by the Minnesota Twins for two seasons 1980 and 1981. T.C. replaced him in 2000.

=== Waldo the White Sox Wolf ===
Waldo the White Sox Wolf was a short-lived mascot of the Chicago White Sox in the 1990s before Southpaw's debut in 2004.

=== Youppi! ===
Youppi! was the mascot of the Montreal Expos, before the franchise moved to Washington as the Washington Nationals. He is an orange furry creature with a white face originally leased in 1979 and designed by Bonnie Erickson, formerly a designer for some of Jim Henson's Muppets characters. Youppi! was so named resembling the phrase Yippee! or Hooray! in French. Youppi! was the first mascot to be thrown out of a Major League Baseball game: on August 23, 1989, in the 11th inning, while atop the visitors' dugout, Youppi! took a running leap, landing hard and noisily on its roof, and then sneaked into a front row seat. Los Angeles Dodgers manager Tommy Lasorda complained to the umpires and Youppi! was ejected, though he later returned, confined to the home team's dugout roof. Youppi! was abandoned as a mascot and replaced with Screech after the Expos franchise moved to Washington in 2005, but was adopted by the NHL's Montreal Canadiens team on September 16, 2005, as potentially the first sports mascot to switch their allegiance from one sport to another, while remaining in the same city.

Youppi! was voted to the Mascot Hall of Fame in December 2019, and was inducted in June 2020. Youppi! is the first mascot of a Canadian team to receive the honor.

== Teams without a mascot ==
The following MLB teams do not currently have an official mascot:

- New York Yankees
- Los Angeles Dodgers
- Los Angeles Angels

== Mascot store in various ballparks ==
The "Build-A-Bear Workshop" Make-Your-Own-Phanatic store, at Citizens Bank Park, was the first store of its kind in sports. Fans are invited to buy and stuff a Phillie Phanatic doll and dress it up. Following the 2010 season, the Build-A- Bear in Philadelphia was discontinued. Similar shops have since been set up in Cincinnati (Great American Ball Park), Cleveland (Progressive Field), St. Louis (Busch Stadium), San Francisco (Oracle Park), and Washington, D.C. (Nationals Park). The Milwaukee Brewers also have in their main team store at Miller Park a whole section of their store consisting entirely of merchandise featuring the Racing Sausages, called The Meat Locker.

== See also ==
- List of mascots
