= Mr. Baseball (disambiguation) =

Mr. Baseball is a 1992 American sports comedy film.

Mr. Baseball may also refer to:

- Harry Simmons (baseball) (1907–1998), American baseball executive, writer and historian
- Bob Uecker (1934–2025), American former baseball player, baseball announcer, and actor

== See also ==
- King of Baseball, a ceremonial title awarded by Minor League Baseball to one person each year since 1951
- Mr. Met, mascot of the New York Mets, featuring a large baseball for a head
- Mr. Red, first mascot of the Cincinnati Reds, featuring a large baseball for a head
- Max Patkin (1920–1999), American baseball player also known as the "Clown Prince of Baseball"
