= Orbit (mascot) =

Mascot of the Houston Astros

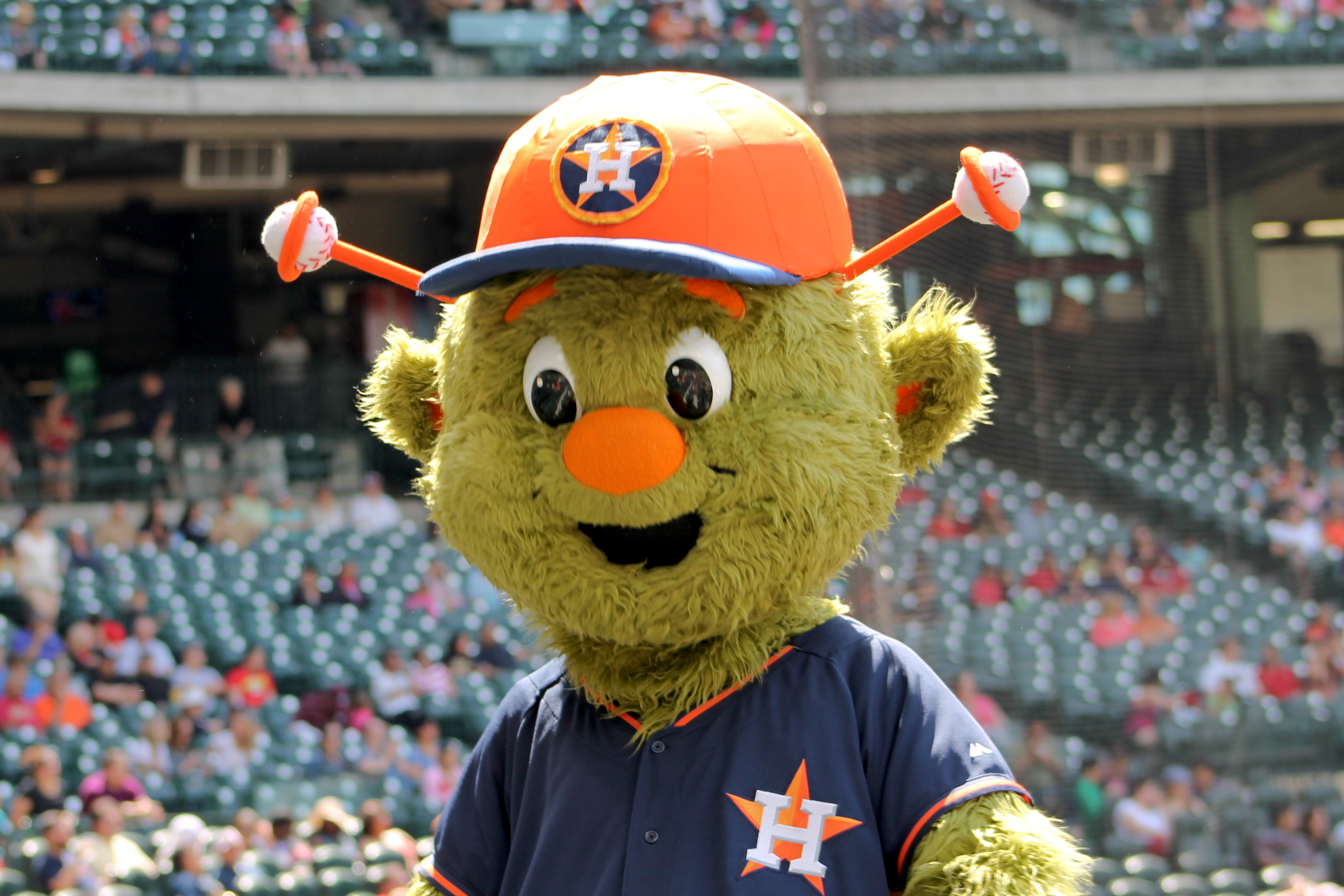
- Orbit entertains fans at Daikin Park in March 2014
- Team: Houston Astros
- Description: Anthropomorphic space alien
- First seen: 1990
- Related mascot(s): Junction Jack
- Website: Astros.com

Orbit is the mascot of Major League Baseball's Houston Astros. He is a lime green alien wearing an Astros jersey with antennae extending into baseballs. Orbit was the team's official mascot from the 1990 through the 1999 seasons until the 2000 season, where Junction Jack was introduced as the team's mascot with the move from the Astrodome to then Enron Field. Orbit returned on November 2, 2012, at the unveiling of the Astros new look for their 2013 debut in the American League. The name Orbit pays homage to Houston's association with NASA and nickname Space City.

== History ==
In April 1977, the Astros introduced their first mascot, Chester Charge. At that time there was only one other mascot in major league baseball, which was the San Diego Chicken. Chester Charge was a 45-pound costume of a cartoon Texas cavalry soldier on a horse. Chester appeared on the field at the beginning of each home game, during the seventh inning stretch and then ran around the bases at the conclusion of each win. At the blast of a bugle, the scoreboard would light up and the audience would yell, “Charge!” The first Chester Charge was played by Steve Ross who was then an 18-year-old Senior High School student.

Following a visit to then the AAA-Astros affiliate, the Tucson Toros in 1989, former team marketing Vice President Ted Haracz sought to bring the Toros' mascot, Tuffy to Houston to serve as the team's mascot. Although Tuffy was not promoted from Tucson, Hal Katzman, who performed as Tuffy was invited by the team to serve as Orbit for the 1990 season. The development of a team mascot for the 1990 season was viewed by the team as an important piece in its community outreach programs, specifically with children. John Sorrentino was the newly appointed Director of Community Relations. Sorrentino became instrumental in the design phase of the mascot costume as well as the design of the community outreach program. Sorrentino was able to form a partnership with the FBI and its director, William Sessions to create a "Stay in School, Stay Drug Free" to elementary schools in the Houston area. Both the naming and design of the mascot were established from suggestion from Houston-area schoolchildren. The design for Orbit was derived from more than 10,000 children's drawings submitted to the Astros, with the final design being a composite of the various drawings submitted. The first public appearance of Orbit occurred in January 1990 at Heflin Elementary School.

One of the more notable incidents involving Orbit occurred when umpire Gary Darling ejected the mascot from the game for arguing balls and strikes. In addition to his role as the Astros' mascot, Orbit made a one-time appearance as "Marty the Mariner Martian" during a "Turn Ahead the Clock" promotion at a 1998 Seattle Mariners game. Orbit was replaced with Junction Jack beginning in the 2000 season, with the team's move from the Astrodome to then Enron Field. Orbit would return to service in 2012 with the Astros branding change.

Orbit was inducted in 2024 into the Mascot Hall of Fame, joining fellow mascots from around Major League Baseball who have received this honor.
