= Blooper (mascot) =

Official mascot for the Atlanta Braves of Major League Baseball

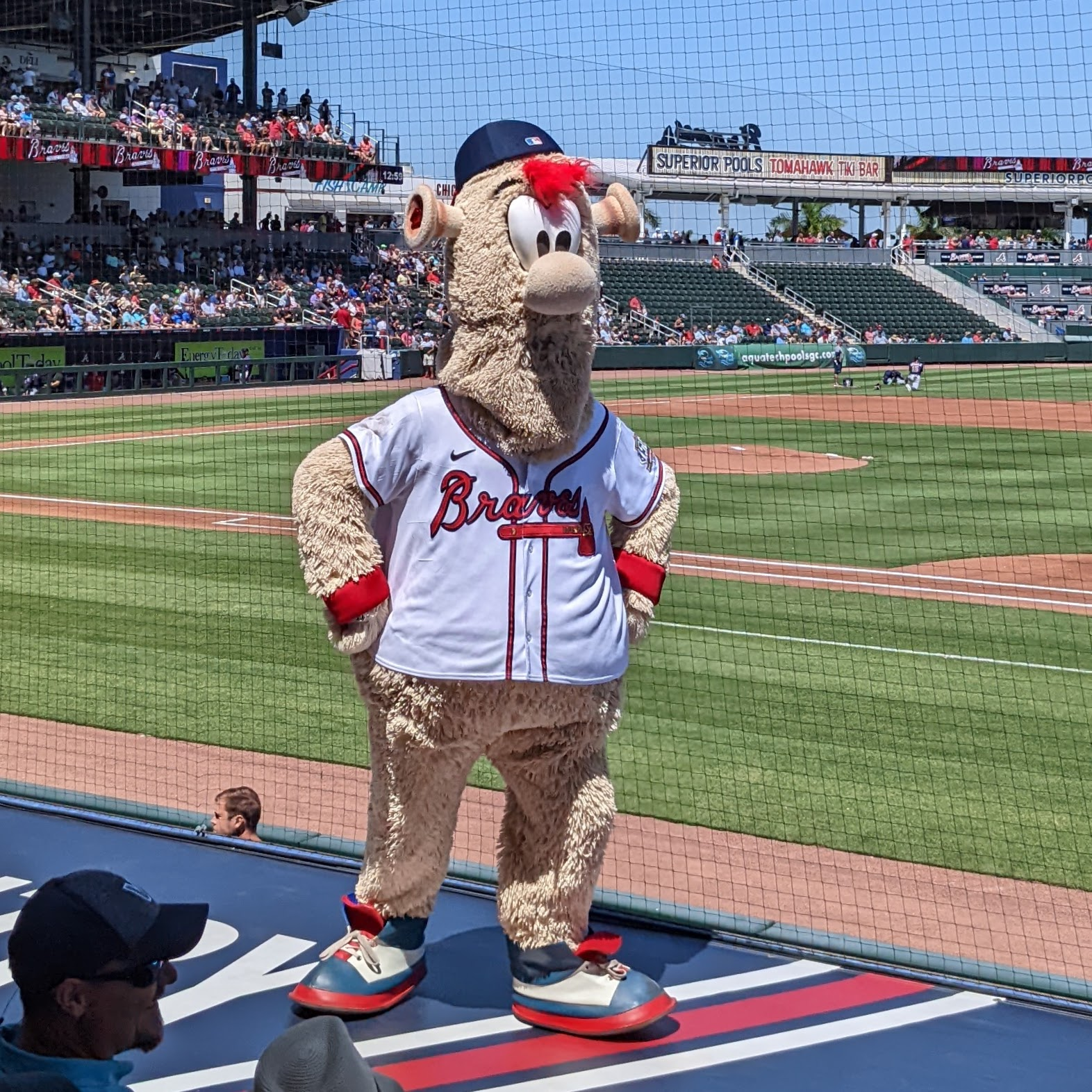
- Blooper, March 26, 2022
- Team: Atlanta Braves
- Description: Large, furry, beige creature
- First seen: January 27, 2018
- Website: Official Website

Blooper is the official mascot for the Atlanta Braves Major League Baseball team. A big, fuzzy creature with Party horns in his ears (much like the Phillie Phanatic has as a tongue), he performs various routines to entertain fans during baseball games at Truist Park, and makes public relation and goodwill appearances for the Braves. While some fans were reluctant when Blooper was introduced, his antics on and off the field soon won fans over in Atlanta.

== Creation ==
Blooper was introduced on January 27, 2018, at the Atlanta Braves fan fest. Blooper succeeded the Braves' "Homer the Brave" mascot after he went into retirement. According to the Braves, he's a "product of science run amok.” He's nearly 7-feet tall and wears a 5XL T-shirt. While fan reception was mixed at first, after the Braves won the 2021 World Series, Blooper was welcomed by Braves fans all over the region.

== Performances ==
Blooper has generated attention on and off the field. In 2019, Blooper pulled off lucrative stunts on both Manny Machado and Bryce Harper. In May of that season, Blooper approached the Padres star for an autograph on a large poster board. Once signed, Blooper revealed it was an oversized check for $300 million—the total value of the contract Machado had recently signed. A month later, Blooper, sporting a judge's robe and wig, called Harper over into foul territory and showed him a board reading "I declare June 16, 2019 'National Bryce Harper Day.'" When Harper signed the proclamation, Blooper revealed that it was actually another oversized check for $330 million—the total value of the contract Harper had recently signed.

During the 2020 COVID-19 shortened season, Blooper dressed up as famous characters like The Mandalorian, Bob Ross, and Guy Fieri. In 2021, Blooper took a shot at the city of Cincinnati by declaring chili doesn't go on spaghetti. The declaration ended up as a feud on Twitter as the Cincinnati Reds and Skyline Chili Twitter accounts responded to Blooper.

After the Braves won the 2021 World Series, Blooper and Braves outfielder Joc Pederson were invited by Georgia Bulldogs football coach Kirby Smart to Athens Georgia. The two were honored during a Georgia Bulldog football game. During a timeout in the game, Pederson and Blooper were cheered by fans when they were introduced on the 10-yard line.
