= Mr. Red =

Mascot of the Cincinnati Reds

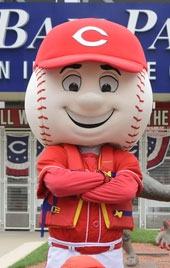
- Mr. Red (wearing a life vest for a promotion)
- Team: Cincinnati Reds
- Description: Man with a baseball for a head
- First seen: 1953
- Related mascot(s): Mr. Redlegs; Rosie Red; Gapper
- Website: www.mlb.com/reds/fans/mascots

Mr. Red is an official mascot for Major League Baseball's Cincinnati Reds. The character first appeared in 1953 as a cartoon figure based on a 19th-century "Red Stockings" ballplayer, with a baseball for a head. Over time the design evolved into multiple forms, including the long-running "Running Man" logo and later live costumed mascots.

The modern Reds employ two mascots descended from the original character: a clean-shaven Mr. Red and a mustachioed retro version known as Mr. Redlegs. Both appear regularly alongside the team's other mascots, Rosie Red and Gapper.

== History ==
=== Origins ===
The character is widely credited to Cincinnati Enquirer sports cartoonist Harold E. Russell, whose caricature-style drawing of a 19th-century Red Stockings–era ballplayer appeared on the cover of the 1953 Reds yearbook and became the visual ancestor of the modern mascots. (The character was first depicted in the March 4, 1953, issue of The Sporting News.)

Henry "Hank" Zureick, the Reds' publicity director and editor/producer of the team's yearbooks and programs in the 1950s, is often associated with early uses of the character in team publications, and some later sources have attributed the creation to him; however, contemporary accounts and logo historians most commonly credit Russell for the design.

=== Logos and patches ===
The unnamed character first appeared on a Reds uniform as a sleeve patch in 1955. The patch featured his baseball-shaped head, clad in an old-fashioned white pillbox baseball cap with red stripes. (He was described in a 1956 Sporting News article as "an emblem of a baseball made it into the face of an old-time player, complete with a black mustache, surmounted by an old-style square cap around which are two thin black stripes.")

The following season, 1956, saw the Reds adopt sleeveless jerseys, and the character was eliminated from the home uniform. He was moved to the left breast of the road uniform, and remained there for one season before being eliminated entirely.

==== Running Man ====
In 1961, a new "Running Man" version of the character appeared, showing the old-fashioned mustachioed Red Stockings ballplayer in motion (running left to right).

In 1968, when the team later adopted a no-facial-hair policy, the mustache was removed, leaving a clean-shaven Running Man — with a modern baseball cap — that served as the Reds' primary logo through the "Big Red Machine" era of the 1970s and into the early 1990s. This new design was created by Jerry Burnett, an artist at Nolan, Keelor and Stites, a Cincinnati ad agency.

From 1968 until 1992, the Running Man logo was shown with uniform number 27. During this period, no Reds player wore the number, which became closely identified with the mascot. According to logo historian Todd Radom, the number was chosen in homage to Dal Maxvill, ironically a St. Louis Cardinals infielder and the favorite player of then-owner Francis L. Dale's young son (Dale was head of the ownership group that purchased the Reds in 1967).

In 1999, the Reds redesigned their uniform and the Running Man character — now running right-to-left — was reintroduced as a sleeve patch on the undershirt.

=== Live mascots ===
==== Mr. Red — first iteration ====
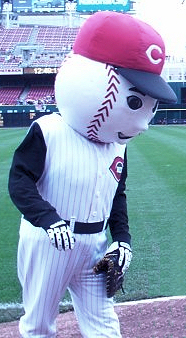
The previous version of Mr. Red, photographed in 2005.

Quoting logo designer Todd Radom, "According to [a] 1982 newspaper article, the first live Mr. Red mascot was introduced in 1973 at the suggestion of the wife of team CEO Dick Wagner." The mascot wore uniform number 73.

Many national viewers saw Mr. Red in Game 5 of the 1975 World Series, when he appeared on screen during the NBC broadcast. (Note: See the DVD version available on A&E Video.) Throughout the 1970s and 1980s, matching the team logo, the Mr. Red mascot wore uniform number 27.

Mr. Red disappeared in the late 1980s, supplanted as the Reds mascot by then-owner Marge Schott's St. Bernard dogs.

The costumed Mr. Red mascot was reintroduced in 1997. In 2002, Mr. Red was joined by "Gapper," a new furry mascot created by David Raymond (the original Phillie Phanatic), in commemoration of the franchise moving to Great American Ball Park.

The head of the original costumed Mr. Red was sometimes described by fans and performers as unsettling. The large, rigid fiberglass head featured stark black eyes and a fixed grin, which one performer recalled as looking like it was "taking [his] soul."

==== Mr. Redlegs mascot ====
In 2007, Mr. Red was retired, replaced by a retro 1950s version known as "Mr. Redlegs," complete with handlebar mustache and old-fashioned baseball uniform. In August 2008, a female companion named "Rosie Red" — named in honor of the group that supports the team, the Rosie Reds — was introduced.

==== Mr. Red - second iteration ====
A new, rebranded/redesigned Mr. Red mascot was unveiled at Redsfest for the 2012 season. The redesigned head featured softer proportions, colored eyes, and a friendlier expression, and was generally considered a more appealing update to the character.

Mr. Red now appears regularly on the field with Gapper, Rosie Red, and Mr. Redlegs.

=== Performers ===
Charles "Chuck" Kindig, at the time a high school junior, was the first person to wear the Mr. Red costume, starting in 1973. A man named Jerry Walke also performed as the mascot in the "early days of Mr. Red." Walke "also was a football player for Capital University in Bexley, Ohio.

When Chuck Kindig left to attend college, "his younger brother Thomas 'Tom' Kindig became Mr. Red. Tom was the mascot from the fall of 1974 through [the] 1979 season."

Dylan Moody was the full-time Mr. Red by 2014, staying in that role until 2016 (when he took over the Mr. Redlegs suit).

=== Timeline ===
Period	Primary design / use	Mustache?	Informal name	Notes / sources
1953 (debut)	Cartoon of a 19th-century "Red Stockings" ballplayer (cover of the 1953 yearbook)	Yes	— (later referred to as Mr. Red / Mr. Redlegs)	Design credited to Harold E. Russell; first appeared in Reds publicity materials produced by Hank Zureick.
1955–56	Sleeve patch (1955) and road-jersey emblem (1956)	Yes	—	Appeared on Reds uniforms as a patch; removed after uniform redesign.
1961	"Running Man" iteration appears in team yearbook/logo	Yes (initially)	Running Man	Running Man art later evolves into the team's primary logo.
c. 1968	Running Man depicted clean-shaven (aligns with team facial-hair policy)	No	Running Man	Referred to as "Cincy Red" in 1968; used through the "Big Red Machine" era.
1999 redesign	Running Man revived as sleeve/secondary patch	—	—	Returned as secondary logo in uniform redesign.
1972–1980s	First costumed mascot (live Mr. Red) debuts at Riverfront Stadium	—	Mr. Red (costumed)	Debuted 1972; widely seen in 1975 World Series; mascot disappeared in late 1980s.
1997	Costumed mascot reintroduced	—	Mr. Red	Returned to field appearances.
2007	Retro mustachioed costumed mascot introduced	Yes	Mr. Redlegs	Based on original 1950s art.
2012	Clean-shaven costumed Mr. Red reintroduced	No	Mr. Red	

== See also ==
- Mr. Met
