= Presidents Race =

Washington Nationals mascot race

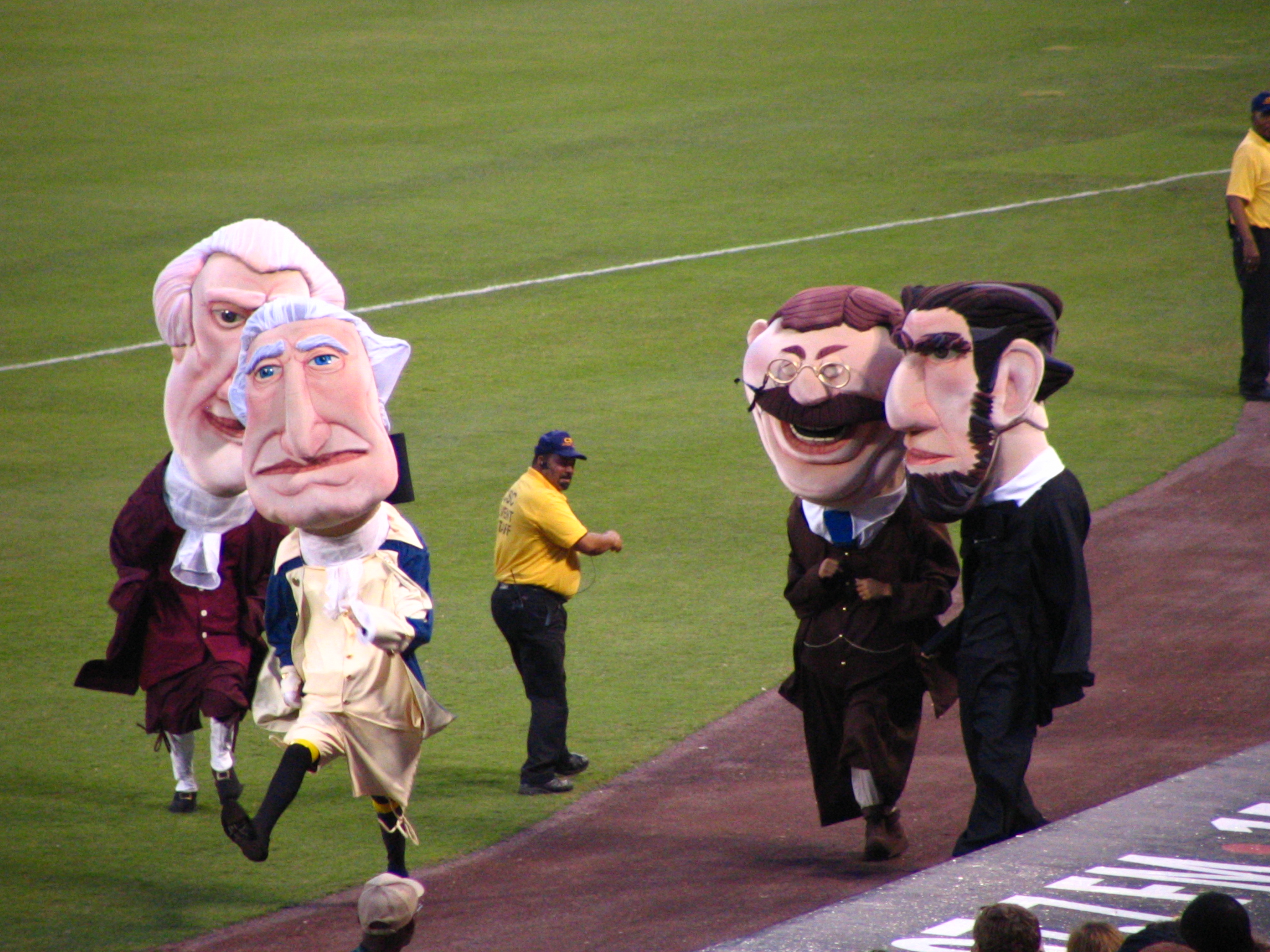
Tom, George, Teddy, and Abe, a few days after their live debut at RFK Stadium in 2006.

The Presidents Race is a mascot race that has been run at every Washington Nationals home game since July 21, 2006. It is held in the middle of the fourth inning of every game.

The Presidents Race has featured likenesses of seven former Presidents of the United States, four of whom are found on Mount Rushmore: George Washington, Abraham Lincoln, Thomas Jefferson, and Theodore Roosevelt, plus William Howard Taft (introduced in 2013 and retired after the 2016 season), Calvin Coolidge (who raced for a single season in 2015) and Herbert Hoover (who raced for a single season in 2016). Their nicknames are "George," "Abe," "Tom," "Teddy," "Bill," "Calvin," and "Herbie." The Presidents are typically dressed in Nationals jerseys numbered according to their term as president (1 for George, 3 for Tom, 16 for Abe, 26 for Teddy, 27 for Bill, 30 for Cal, and 31 for Herbie) and topped with giant foam caricature heads. On Sundays, they usually wear period costumes, often referred to as their "Sunday Best" outfits.

In 2017, the Presidents Race at Nationals Park returned to its format of 2006 through 2012, with only the original four Racing Presidents (George, Abe, Tom, and Teddy) competing. Prior to the 2017 season, the Nationals announced that Cal, Herbie, and Bill all had retired permanently to Florida in conjunction with the February 2017 opening of the Nationals' new spring training facility at The Ballpark of the Palm Beaches – renamed The Fitteam Ballpark of the Palm Beaches in February 2018 – in West Palm Beach, Florida. During spring training in 2017, the three retired Presidents began their own series of Presidents Races in the fourth inning of Nationals spring training games in West Palm Beach.

Famously, Teddy failed to win a single race for almost seven seasons, even when given head starts or other advantages. Teddy won for the first time on Wednesday afternoon game, October 3, 2012, during the first game played after the Nationals reached the postseason for the first time. Fans and bystanders alike were shocked that his first win was during a weekday afternoon game. Several seasons of success followed for Teddy, but he returned to his winless ways during the 2017 season. However, Teddy did win the first and second race of the 2018 season.

== Race standings ==
Presidents Race Results, 2006-2021
Season	#1 George Washington	#3 Thomas Jefferson	#16 Abraham Lincoln	#26 Theodore Roosevelt	#27 William Howard Taft	#30 Calvin Coolidge	#31 Herbert Hoover	Notes
2006	7	15	14	0	—	—	—	Second year at RFK stadium; race debuts July 21
2007	33	26	22	0	—	—	—	Last year at RFK Stadium
2008	18	14	49	0	—	—	—	First year at Nationals Park
2009	22	21	40	0	—	—	—	
2010	29	28	30	0	—	—	—	
2011	23	30	30	0	—	—	—	Nationals right fielder Jayson Werth wins one race.
2012	30	27	29	4	—	—	—	Nationals' first postseason appearance; Teddy Roosevelt wins race for first time on October 3
2013	25	13	23	11	11	—	—	Taft's first season; he debuts on Opening Day on April 1
2014	10	11	25	29	12	—	—	Nationals' second postseason appearance.
2015	17	5	21	15	14	12	—	Coolidge's addition announced in mid-season; he debuts July 3 in his only season
2016	16	17	18	23	9	—	10	Screech the Bald Eagle wins one race; Hoover debuts on April 10 in his only season; Taft's last season; Nationals' third postseason appearance
2017	29	29	25	0	—	—	—	Screech the Bald Eagle wins one race; Nationals' fourth postseason appearance; Teddy Roosevelt winless for first time since 2011
2018	31	25	17	10	—	—	—	Screech the Bald Eagle wins one race.
2019	18	20	20	38	—	—	—	Screech the Bald Eagle and Buster Olney both win one race.
2020	—	—	—	—	—	—	—	In-stadium races suspended due to COVID-19 pandemic.
2021	16	19	13	8	—	—	—	Live races resumed in June, 2021
Overall	324	300	376	138	46	12	10	

== Origin of the race ==
The predecessor to the Presidents Race was the PNC Dollar Derby, an animated cartoon displayed on the giant video board during the 2005 inaugural season at RFK Stadium. Sponsored by PNC Bank, the Dollar Derby cartoons depicted a car race between three US historical figures whose faces appear on U.S. paper currency: George Washington, Abraham Lincoln, and Alexander Hamilton. Each represented a section in the stadium (orange, red, and yellow seats). During the races, one competitor would generally have some early mishap such as spinning out, leaving the other two competitors to race to the end. Each racer won a fair number of times.

For the 2006 season, the Dollar Derby was replaced by the Presidents Race, a cartoon depicting four presidents racing through Washington, D.C., and avoiding obstacles such as traffic cones, open manholes, and closed streets.

== Live-action racing ==
After the team's purchase by Ted Lerner during the 2006 season, the new owner announced changes for the stadium and a "grand re-opening" of RFK Stadium after the All-Star Break. Among the changes: the Presidents' Race became a live event first held on July 21, 2006.

The race still began with an animation on the video board: the four cartoon presidents dashed through Washington, D.C., and headed towards RFK Stadium. Immediately after disappearing from the screen, the costumed live-action presidents emerged from the right field corner as 10-foot-tall (3-meter-tall) men with large caricature foam heads. The presidents bolted out from right field and down the first base line, past the visitors' dugout, and to the finish line by home plate.

Beginning in the 2007 season, the animated lead-in was replaced with a taped video of the caricature-headed presidents running from the White House, around various Washington landmarks, and heading towards RFK Stadium. The 2007 season's promotions included giveaways of 7.5-inch (19-centimeter) bobbleheads of the four Racing Presidents.

In 2008, the Presidents Race became a highlighted attraction of the team's new stadium, Nationals Park. Images of George, Tom, Abe, and Teddy are featured on stadium signage and at the team store/gift shop, which is now named "Rushmores." The racing presidents themselves began greeting visitors before games at the main entrance, and posing for photos in a "Kids Zone" after the Presidents Race and through the end of each game. The race itself was also lengthened, with an extended introduction and a longer distance, usually running from center field clockwise by the first base foul pole and down the foul line towards a finish line near the Nationals' dugout.

In 2009, a new food concession was opened at Nationals Park called Teddy's Barbeque, featuring images of Theodore Roosevelt and a signature food item—a 13-inch (33-centimeter) beef short rib called the "Rough Rider".

=== Teddy's losing streak and the Let Teddy Win movement ===
The running joke of the Presidents Race had been Theodore "Teddy" Roosevelt's inability to win a race. The reasons for Teddy's failures had consistently varied, ranging from tripping, confusion, being attacked by a man dressed as a shark, attempting to tweet while racing and subsequently falling over, to striking up conversations with fans and forgetting to run. In 2006, he was also disqualified for cheating when he drove a golf cart past his competitors, and for emerging from the visitors' dugout instead of running the length of the first base line.

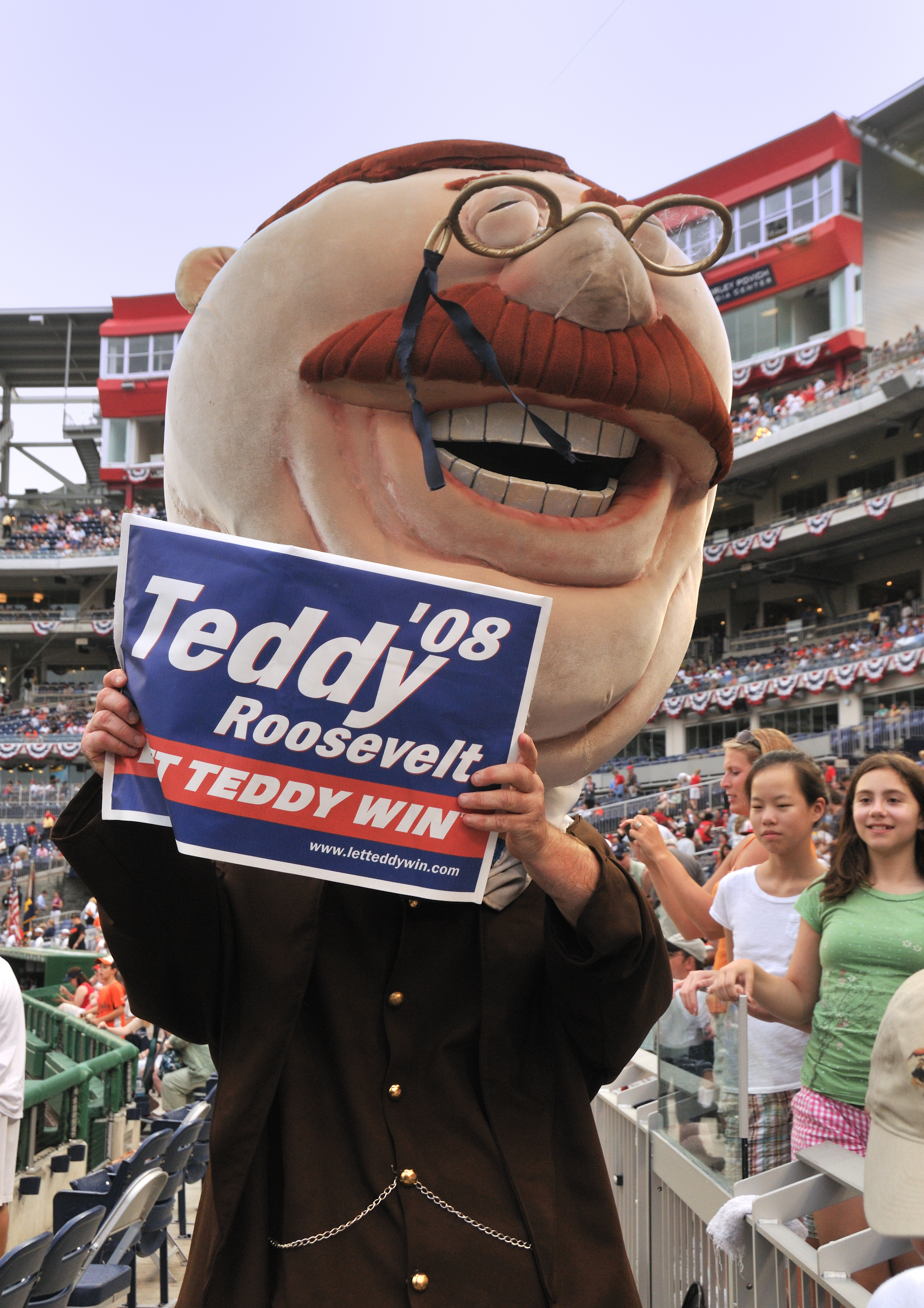
Teddy Roosevelt displays a campaign rally sign at Nationals Park in 2008.

Teddy's shutout—and his antics—continued through the 2007 season as he was disqualified on Opening Day for zip-lining into the infield from the top of the stadium. He was also disqualified in September for riding in a rickshaw pulled by a bicycle. The 2007 season's promotional Presidential bobbleheads generated anticipation that Teddy would see his first victory. George, Tom, and Abe each won the race on their respective days, and they were escorted by the "Secret Service" to guarantee the runaway victories. Teddy's bobblehead giveaway was September 1, and 42,000 fans showed up to watch as Teddy was carried in on a throne while the "Secret Service" held back the other three racers. Halfway home, Teddy asked to be lowered and was dropped; while his escort was helping him to his feet, the other racers got around the blockade and George won the race by a couple of feet. Soon after, a "Let Teddy Win" website and social media campaign was launched by Nationals fan Scott Ableman, tied to the upcoming presidential election.

On September 23, 2007, in the final game at RFK Stadium, Teddy was heavily anticipated to finally win. When the race started, the Nationals bullpen held George, Tom, and Abe back to help Teddy to victory. But Teddy never showed up; the video board showed him at the unfinished Nationals Park, apparently confused to find no one else there.

With the opening of Nationals Park in 2008 came increased fanfare for the Presidents Race and a growing fan fervor for Teddy. Teddy's losing streak was extended with the stadium's inaugural game, as he ran off-course across the outfield and was distracted by members of the opposing team. In subsequent races, Teddy was disqualified for cutting the outfield corner and for riding a motor scooter. The theme of sabotage was also introduced in 2008 as Teddy was tackled or tripped just short of the finish line on several occasions by visitors from the stands, including costumed bananas, panthers, and mascots from other teams.

Teddy mania reached a fever pitch during a June 2008 series against the Baltimore Orioles, part of the annual Beltway Series between the teams, when Teddy was tripped short of the finish line by the Orioles mascot "The Bird." On June 28, 2008, the Presidents Race was suspended for a day as Teddy won a one-on-one "grudge match" race against The Bird, giving Teddy his first victory. However, it was announced that the "unsanctioned" race would not be recognized in the standings by "The Presidents Racing Association of America." The next day, Teddy refused to race with the other presidents, choosing to help the Nationals grounds crew instead. The interleague rivalry between Teddy and the Orioles Bird extended into 2009, when the mascots tackled each other in back-to-back games at Nationals Park.

On Sunday, July 26, 2009, during a game against the San Diego Padres, Teddy used a motor scooter to pass the field and cross the finish line first. However, after the judges' consideration, Teddy was disqualified from the race, and remained winless.

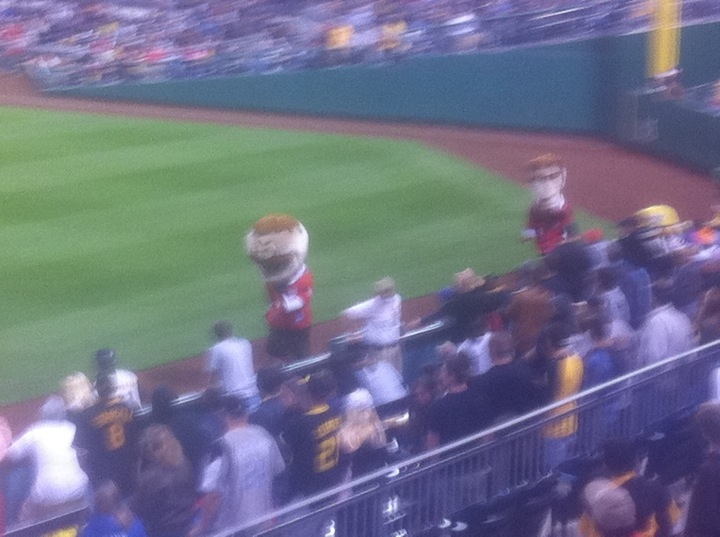
Teddy Roosevelt and Abraham Lincoln of the Presidents Race running the Great Pierogi Race at PNC Park during a Pirates-Nationals game on April 23, 2011.

From July 31 to August 3, 2009, the Racing Presidents appeared at PNC Park in Pittsburgh in the Great Pierogi Race. During the first night's relay race, Potato Pete TKO-ed Teddy with a flying tackle. The following night Teddy ran into the wall after leading the race and lost.

On September 8, 2009, Teddy appeared to have won his first race, but was disqualified for recruiting an extra mascot onto the field to interfere with the other presidents.

On April 23, 2011, Teddy and Abe both raced two Racing Pierogis (Jalapeño Hannah and Cheese Chester) in the Great Pierogi Race at PNC Park in Pittsburgh, during a Pirates-Nationals game. Despite an early head start before the race officially began, Teddy lost to Hannah.

During a game against the Atlanta Braves on September 24, 2011, Nationals right fielder Jayson Werth and relief pitchers in the Nationals' bullpen interfered with the Presidents Race in attempt to block the other Presidents and allow Teddy to win. Teddy failed to take advantage of their efforts, falling down repeatedly instead of heading for the finish line, and Werth finally broke the tape at the finish line himself to become the only player ever to win a Presidents Race. After the game, Werth expressed frustration with Teddy's losing streak, saying, "What’s the poor guy got to do to get a win?...A great American president. Just a great American, period." He explained his and the bullpen's interference in the race by saying, "To me, the Presidents Race and Teddy Roosevelt are very symbolic of where this [the Nationals] organization goes...It needs to be addressed. It needs to be answered."

On July 4, 2012, ESPN's SportsNation featured the President Race at the conclusion of their "101 Celebration Fails" episode. George fell at the beginning of the race, and Teddy had tried numerous antics to defeat the others, including throwing a rack of basketballs in front of Abe. After gaining a massive lead, he stopped just short of the finish line to celebrate; while Teddy was kneeling, or Tebowing, George approached from behind in a SportsNation van and clubbed Teddy with a baseball bat, once again dealing Teddy a loss.

On August 17, 2012, the 499th Presidents Race was held during the Discovery Channel's annual "Shark Week". Teddy appeared wearing shark teeth and a makeshift dorsal fin. Starting the race in last position, Teddy was assisted by another man in a shark suit who systematically tackled each of the other presidents, allowing Teddy to pass. Just as it looked like Teddy was going to win, Abe (the first one tackled) passed him and crossed the finish line. It has become a tradition for people dressed as sharks to appear during the races held during Shark Week.

After Teddy passed 500 losses in August, 2012, national press interest increased, culminating in a featured segment that ran repeatedly on the ESPN TV Network. Titled "Teddy Roosevelt's Rough Ride," the segment, which originated on ESPN's E:60, was narrated by Ken Burns and featured presidential candidate John McCain, "Let Teddy Win" founder Scott Ableman, and Roosevelt's great-great-grandson Winthrop Roosevelt. McCain called for a congressional investigation into Teddy's losses, prompting president Barack Obama to respond with a statement of bipartisan support shared via his press secretary Jay Carney aboard Air Force One. The "Let Teddy Win" movement became a national story featured on major TV and radio networks, national newspapers, and even political websites.

==== Teddy wins ====
Two weeks later, on October 3, 2012, the final day of the 2012 regular season, Teddy finally won his first race, breaking a 525-race losing streak with help from a fake version of the Phillie Phanatic. The victory came two days after the Nationals earned their first playoff appearance since moving to Washington in 2005 and the first playoff appearance by a Washington, D.C., MLB team since the Washington Senators played in the 1933 World Series. The Rough Rider then won the next three races, all in the 2012 National League Division Series against the St. Louis Cardinals. However, a ninth-inning collapse by the Nats in the fifth and final game ended the season.

On August 15, 2014, at Nationals Park, Teddy avenged his five-year humiliation in Pittsburgh by tackling Potato Pete near the finish line in what SportsCenter anchor Scott Van Pelt called “the greatest highlight I’ve ever seen.” On September 28 of that same year, Teddy, with a little help from The Penguins of Madagascar, won his first season-long race title.

==== Return to losing ====
During the April 16, 2017 race, the mascots tackled every other President except for Teddy. When it appeared he was going to win, the Easter Bunny leaped from the stands and tackled him. The Easter Bunny would later make another appearance during the 2018 all-star game, played at Nationals Park. This would set the tone for the rest of the year, as Teddy returned to his previous role as the lovable loser. Following a win by George on October 1, Teddy finished the regular season winless for the seventh time, but the first since 2011. However, he did win an unofficial race during the Congressional Baseball Game.

=== Suspension of races during COVID-19 pandemic ===
The 2020 MLB season was shortened due to the COVID-19 pandemic, with limits on fan attendance and the number of on-field personnel. As a result, the live, in-stadium presidents race was suspended for all of 2020 and much of 2021. During this absence, the team held exhibition races between the presidents outside the stadium, which were shared via video and on social media on some game days. Live, in-stadium races resumed mid-season on June 11, 2021.

=== New entries ===
It was announced in The Washington Post on January 25, 2013, that a likeness of William Howard Taft ("Bill" for short), the 27th President of the United States, would be added to the roster of entries for the 2013 season, making him the first new entry - and the fifth overall - in the race. Bill debuted at the NatsFest event on January 26, 2013. Bill made his debut in the race on Opening Day on April 1, 2013, in which Bill pushed Abe down, leaving him, George, and Teddy to continue until Bill pushed Teddy to the wall in foul territory in right field – but then Teddy tripped Bill, leaving George to win the race. On May 11, 2013, Bill won his first race when he and Teddy were left racing after the other three presidents were taken down. The next day, in a dizzy bat race on May 12, 2013, Teddy won his first race since the 2012 National League Division Series as he and George approached the finish line, Teddy finished first after George lost his bat. Bill and Teddy each won 11 races during the 2013 season.

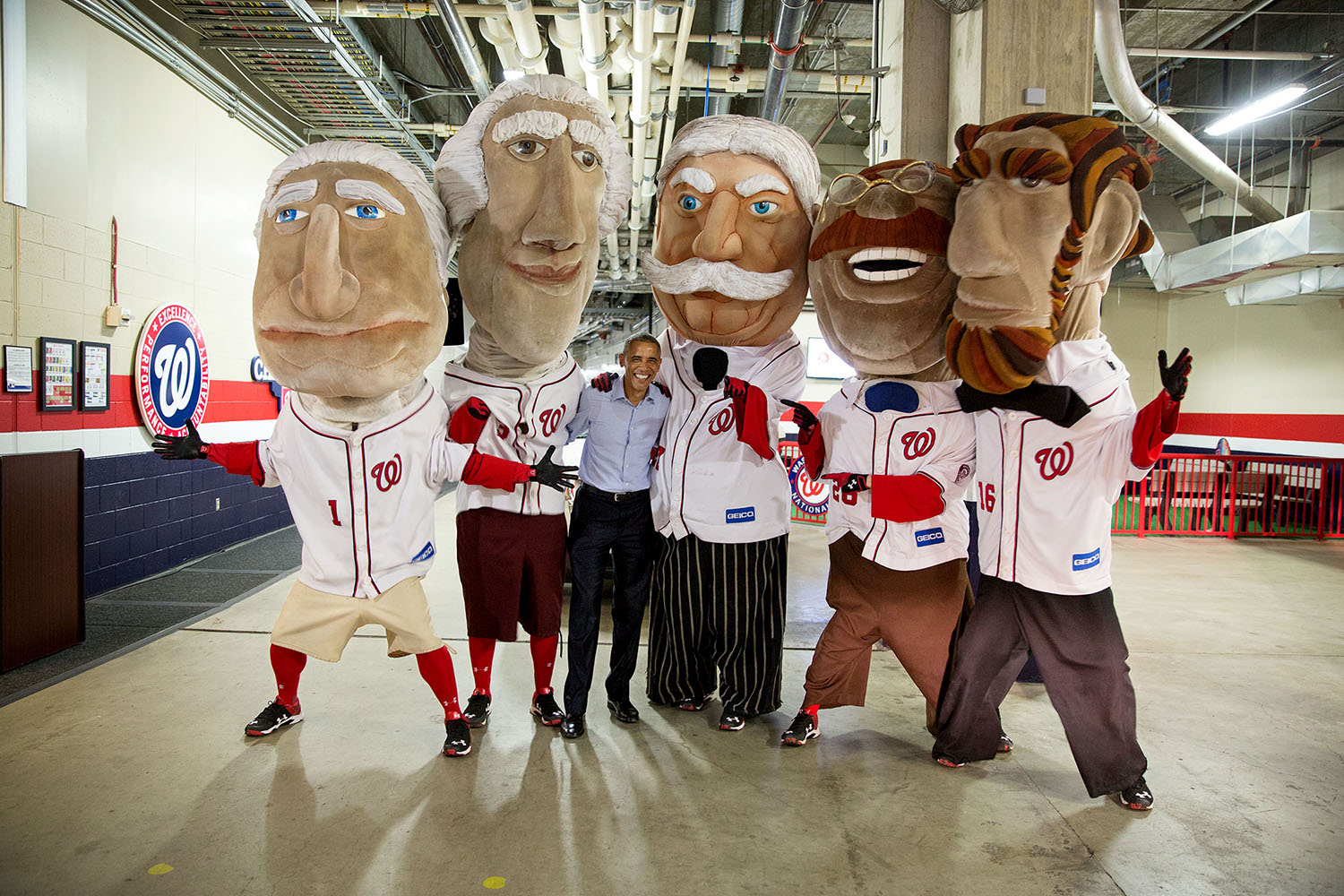
President Obama poses with The Racing Presidents at a Nationals game on June 11, 2015.

In 2015, the Nationals entered a three-year marketing partnership with the White House Historical Association in which the president honored in the Association's annual Christmas ornament each year also would appear that season as a Racing President at Nationals Park. In accordance with the agreement, the Nationals announced midway through the 2015 season that a likeness of Calvin Coolidge ("Cal" for short), the 30th President of the United States, would become the sixth Racing President, as well as the first one to join the race while an MLB season was in progress. Cal debuted on July 3, 2015, the eve of his 143rd birthday, during a game against the San Francisco Giants. In his first race, Cal appeared behind the other five racing presidents and knocked down Abe and then Teddy near the finish line for his first win. Cal was retired after the 2015 season and replaced by Herbert Hoover ("Herbie" for short), the subject of the Association's 2016 Christmas ornament, in the second game of the 2016 season. Herbie made his debut during an April 10, 2016, game against the Miami Marlins, and, like Cal in his first race, emerged victorious.

=== Retirements and spring training races ===
During the 2016-2017 offseason, the Nationals announced that Cal, Herbie, and Bill had retired permanently to Florida, where they would compete against one another in races held during the fourth inning of Nationals spring training games at The Ballpark of the Palm Beaches in West Palm Beach, which opened in February 2017 and was renamed FITTEAM Ballpark of the Palm Beaches in February 2018. As a result of Taft's retirement and the Nationals' decision not to add Franklin Delano Roosevelt as a Racing President in 2017, the Presidents Race at Nationals Park reverted in 2017 to its original format of 2006 through 2012, with competition between George, Tom, Abe, and Teddy, while a new era of spring training Presidents Races between Cal, Herbie, and Bill began at FITTEAM Ballpark of the Palm Beaches.

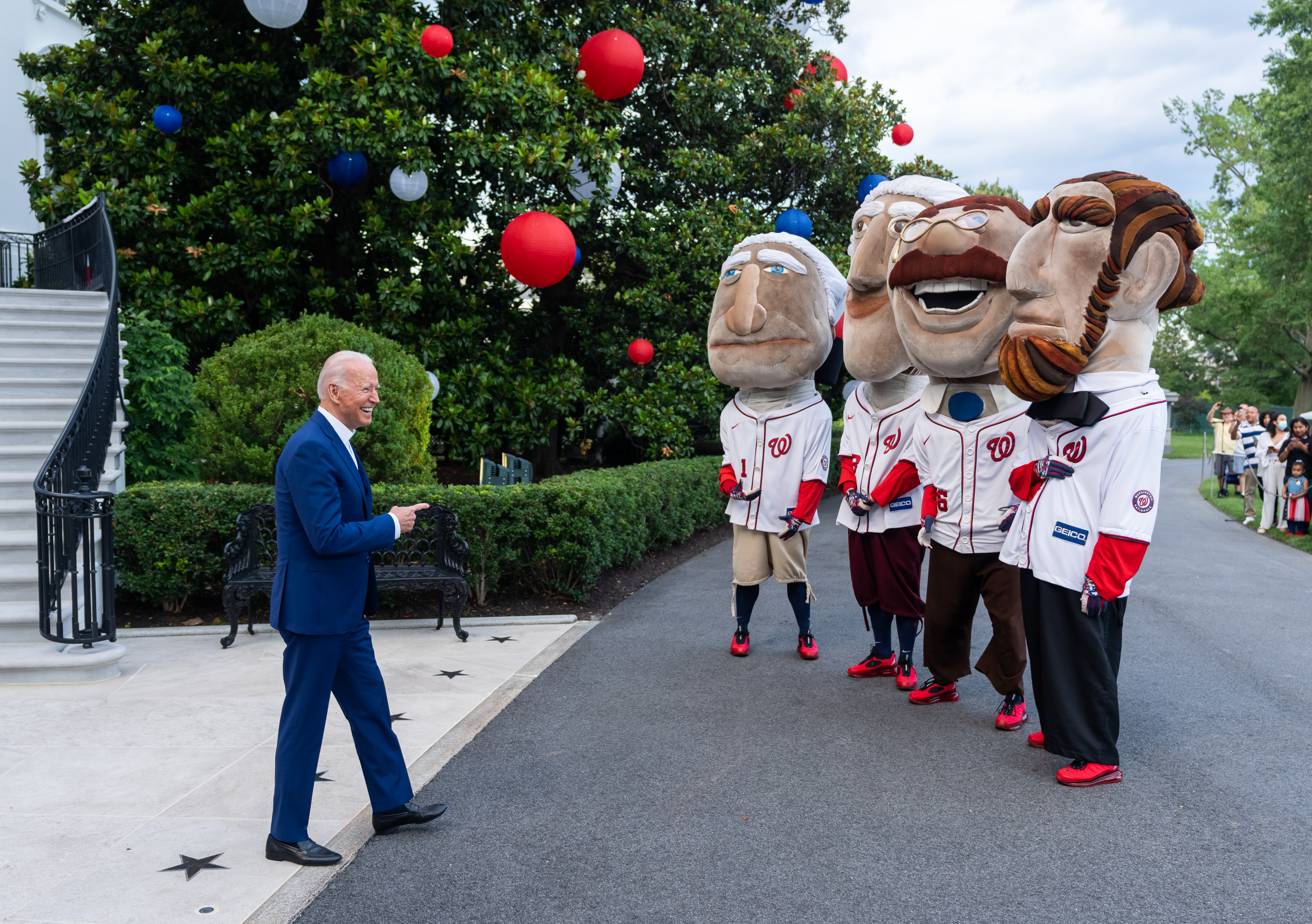
President Joe Biden is welcomed by the Racing Presidents on the South Lawn Driveway of the White House during the 2021 Fourth of July celebration.

=== Local celebrities ===
The Nationals' Racing Presidents have become established as fixtures in the Washington, D.C. social scene. The presidents have made numerous appearances at the White House, including the annual Easter Egg Roll, and the Independence Day fireworks. In 2008, Racing President Teddy Roosevelt entered and finished D.C.'s Marine Corps Marathon in full costume. The presidents have also appeared at several presidential inaugural balls and were in the January 20, 2009, inaugural parade for President Barack Obama.

=== Awards ===
The Presidents Race has also received acclaim throughout the sports promotions industry. Some awards the Presidents have garnered:

- 2007 – Winner: Gameops.com Best of 2007 "Best Contest or On-Field Promotion"
- 2008 – Honorable Mention: Gameops.com Best of 2008 "Best Contest or On-Field Promotion"
- 2009 – Winner: IDEA Conference Golden Matrix Award "Best Interactive Feature"
- 2009 – Winner: Washington, DC St. Patrick's Day Parade "Most Humorous Float"
- 2009 – Winner: Gameops.com Best of 2009 "Best Contest or On-Field Promotion"
- 2010 – Honorable Mention: Gameops.com Best of 2010 "Best Contest or On-Field Promotion"
- 2012 – Winner: Gameops.com Best of 2012 "Best Contest or On-Field Promotion"
- 2013 – Winner: IDEA Conference Golden Matrix Award "Best Interactive Feature"

=== Giveaways ===
As part of their promotional events, the Washington Nationals have held several bobblehead giveaways featuring the Racing Presidents, a group of costumed mascots portraying four U.S. Presidents: George Washington, Thomas Jefferson, Abraham Lincoln, and Theodore Roosevelt. These giveaways were first held in 2007, and have been repeated in 2014, 2016, and 2023.

== See also ==
- Sausage Race
- Great Pierogi Race
