= Buccaneer (mascot) =

The Buccaneer was a secondary mascot used by the Pittsburgh Pirates baseball club during their 1995 season. While the team's primary mascot, the Pirate Parrot, wore an elaborate costume with a prosthetic head and molded frame, the Buccaneer was simply a man in pirate's garb who led the crowd in organized cheers. After an audition involving 30 prospective mascots, 23-year-old Tim Beggy was chosen in May 1995 to portray the Buccaneer.

Beggy was arrested along with a woman on July 11, 1995, while skinny dipping and having sex after hours in a closed public swimming pool. Beggy and the woman both reached a plea agreement, under which they each paid a $100 fine and court costs in exchange for more serious charges of "open lewdness" being dropped. Beggy's arrest attracted national attention, including jokes on The Tonight Show, and the Pirates subsequently discontinued the use of the character in the wake of the negative publicity.
