= Sausage Race =

Mascot race at Milwaukee Brewers baseball games

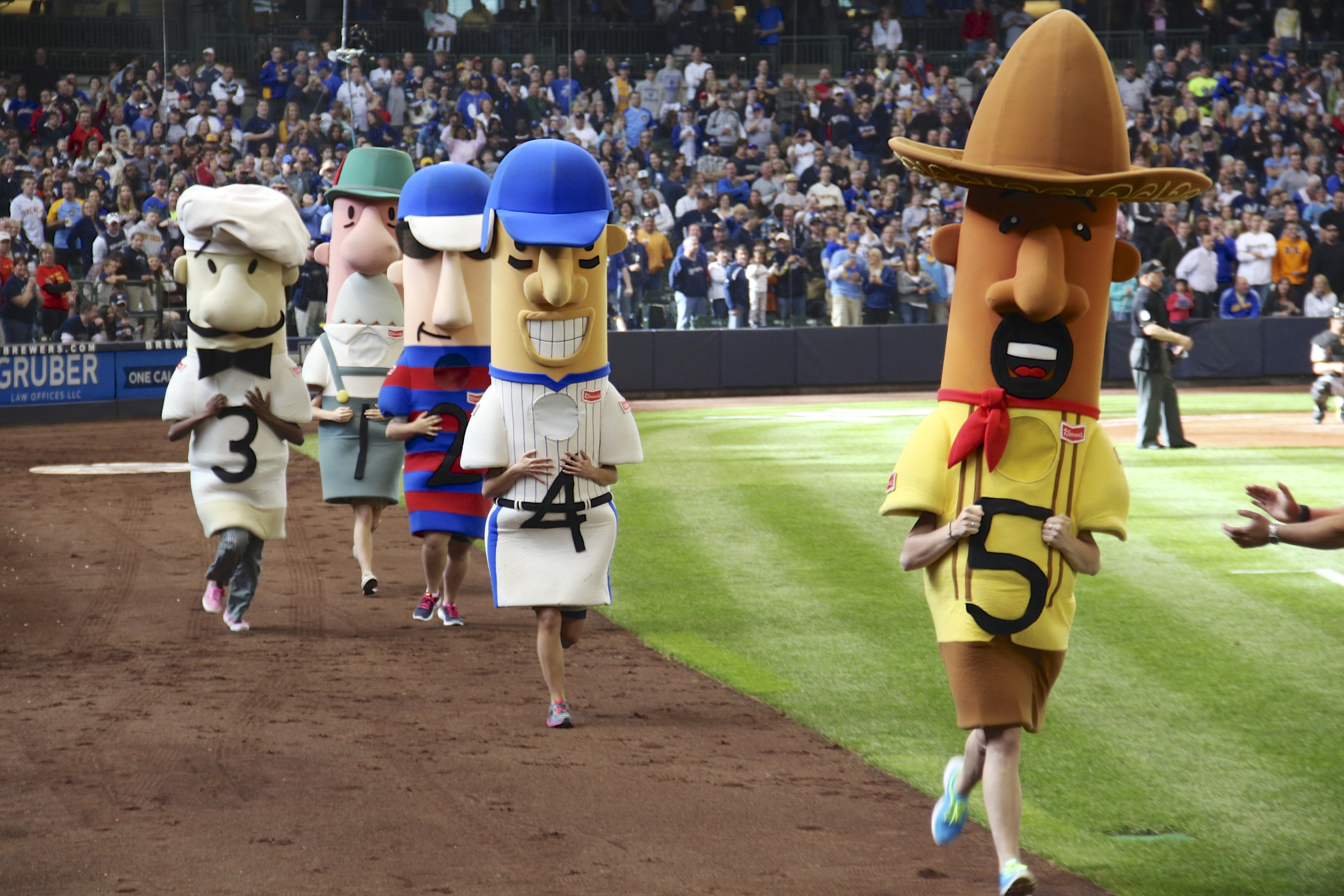
The Racing Sausages

The Johnsonville Sausage Race (known as the Famous Racing Sausages or the Sausage Race) is a race of sausage mascots held during the middle of the sixth inning at every home game of the Milwaukee Brewers. The Sausage Race began as a promotion for the Klement's Sausage Company, located in Milwaukee, Wisconsin, whose sausages were served at American Family Field (and previously at Milwaukee County Stadium), the home of the Brewers. In 2021, Johnsonville sausages began being served at American Family Field.

== Famous Racing Sausages ==
The race started in the early 1990s with just three sausages – the bratwurst, the Polish sausage (kielbasa), and the Italian sausage. Since then, two new sausages have joined the race – the hot dog, introduced in the mid-1990s, and the chorizo, which was unveiled and eventually joined the race in the mid-2000s.

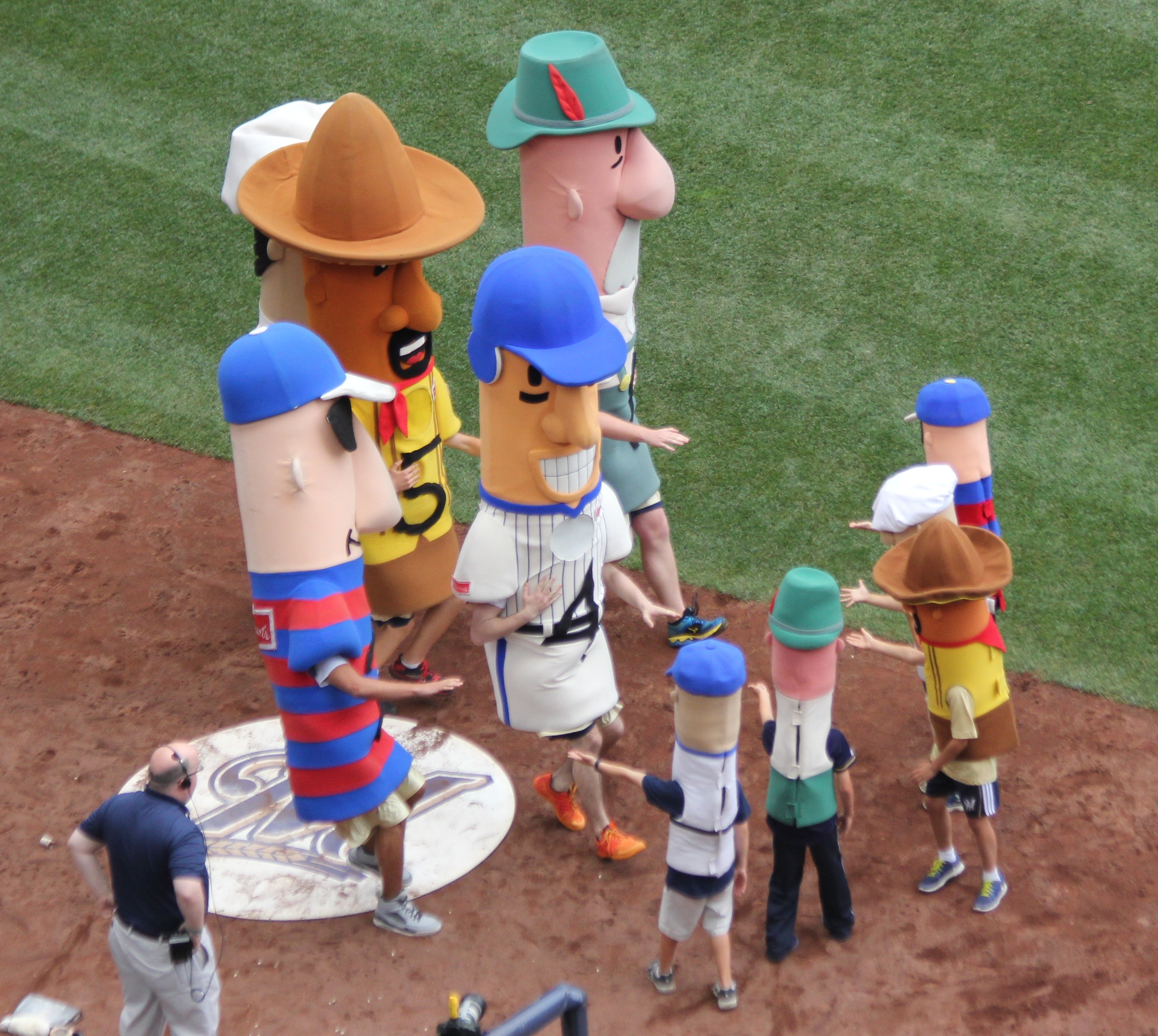
The regular sausages tag the Little Weenies. They finish Sunday afternoon races for their Racing Sausage counterparts.

Employees of the Milwaukee Brewers or American Family Field usually run the race. Donning over-sized foam sausage costumes that measure 7 ft 3 in (2.21 m) from the top of the head to the knees of the runners, the contestants start their race between the dugout and the baseline around third base. They sprint down the warning track, around home plate and continue toward first base. On Sunday afternoon home games, the Sausages tag off to miniature versions of themselves, dubbed the Little Weenies, who finish the remainder of the race.

The sausages appear at many local charity events, including an annual 5K run/walk in their honor, with proceeds going to Brewers Community Foundation, and are available for personal appearances on non-game days. They also have a twice-yearly home-and-home relay race against their Pittsburgh Pirates counterparts, the Racing Pierogies.

The sausages have starred in two SportsCenter spots for ESPN. The first, set at ESPN's cafeteria, was shown at American Family Field on 19 May 2006. The second features them in a parody of the Running of the Bulls with ESPN employees.

== History ==
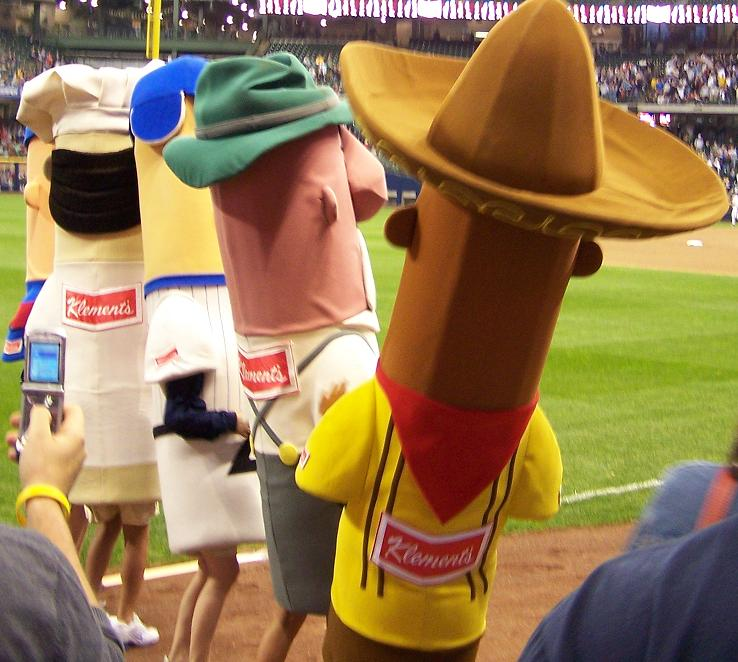
The sausages prepare to race.

=== Origins ===
The Famous Sausage Race began as a scoreboard animation in the early 1990s with just three characters – The Bratwurst, The Polish and The Italian – running toward Milwaukee County Stadium against a backdrop of the city of Milwaukee.

In the fall of 1992, Milwaukee graphic designer Michael Dillon of McDill Design presented an idea to Gabe Paul, who was the Vice President of Operations for the Brewers, to transform the race from the scoreboard to live action.

On June 27, 1993, as the Sausages approached Milwaukee County Stadium on the scoreboard video, the left field doors swung open and – much to the surprise of players and fans – out came the larger-than-life mascots. The three made their way to home plate with The Bratwurst (worn by Dillon) winning the first-ever live race.

For the remainder of the 1993 season, the Sausages raced live only at those games with particularly high attendance. In 1994, the live Sausage race resumed on Sunday, May 29 – the day the Brewers retired Robin Yount's number 19 jersey – and became a fixture at every home game since.

At the outset, the Sausage Race featured only three entrants: The bratwurst, the Polish sausage, and the Italian sausage. The Hot Dog joined the race in the middle-1990s. In 2007, after a one-race tryout the previous year, The Chorizo rounded out the group of five Sausages fans see today.

=== Randall Simon incident ===
On July 9, 2003, Randall Simon, then the first baseman of the Pittsburgh Pirates, hit the head of a runner's costume with a baseball bat. The tap did not hit the actual head of Mandy Block, who was wearing the Italian sausage costume, but it did knock her over, and she took the Hot Dog down with her. The Polish sausage helped the Italian sausage up and all sausages finished the race. Simon was arrested, fined, and suspended by Major League Baseball for three games. He later apologized. Block laughed off the incident and called herself "just a sausage." She asked only that the offending bat be autographed and given to her. Simon obliged. Later that year, Mandy Block received a complimentary trip to Curaçao, Simon's home island, from the Curaçao Tourism Board. Since the incident, T-shirts and other memorabilia have been sold with the slogan "Don't whack our wiener!" Pittsburgh lost the game 2–1.

Simon was traded to the Chicago Cubs later that season for reasons unrelated to the incident. He returned to Milwaukee with the Cubs for a series against the Brewers. During the first game, Simon's teammates playfully held him back as the sausages raced past their dugout, and manager Dusty Baker guarded the bat rack. In that same game, Simon purchased Italian sausages for a randomly chosen section of the crowd.

=== Parodies ===
On October 1, 2008, the Brewers traveled to Philadelphia to play the Philadelphia Phillies in Milwaukee's first post-season game since the 1982 World Series. In the middle of the 6th inning, three feebly dressed sausages appeared from the left field gate of Citizens Bank Park in what proved to be a mockery of the Miller Park tradition. The three sausages were then accosted by the Phillie Phanatic at home plate, to the delight of the Phillies fans. Simon, who played for the Phillies in 2006, was invited back and received loud cheers as he hit the fake sausages with a large plastic bat. Most fans understood the reference, and laughed that Simon was invited back for the gag.

In Washington, DC, the Washington Nationals made parodies of them, calling them the "un-Racing Sausages" during a Brewers visit to the nation's capital. The Nationals' Presidents Race, which began in 2006, features runners dressed in oversized costumes representing the four Presidents on Mount Rushmore – George Washington, Thomas Jefferson, Abraham Lincoln and Theodore Roosevelt. The parodies were created after Brewers management turned down the Nats' invitation for match races similar to those staged annually with Pittsburgh's racing pierogies. As a response, the Nationals made painted cardboard copies of the Brewers' racers, naming them "Un-talian sausage", "No-Lish Sausage”, "Not-Dog”, "Not-Wurst", and "Choriz-No".

=== The Chorizo joins the race ===
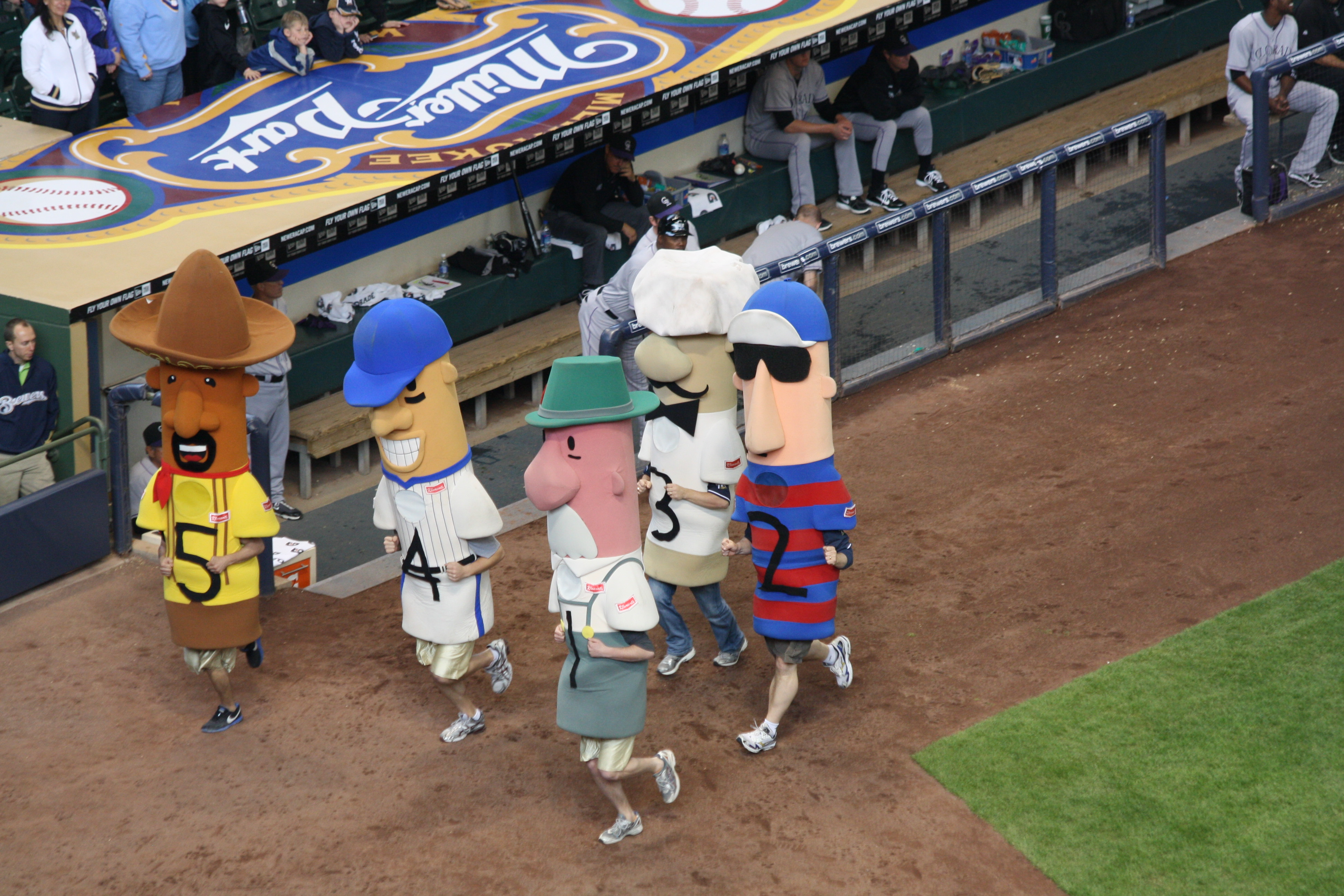
Five sausages racing in 2012 after addition of the Chorizo (#5, left)

The Chorizo was added for the 2006 season to commemorate Latino contributions to the game of baseball, as well as to acknowledge the Brewers' growing Latino fanbase. It ran its first race (and the only one of the 2006 season) on Saturday, July 29 to celebrate Cerveceros Day (cervecero translates to beer-maker or maker of beer, i.e., brewer, in Spanish; the Brewers also wore Cerveceros jerseys on this day). However, the Chorizo did not become a regular participant in the Sausage Race until the 2007 season because of an MLB rule stating that a team may not introduce a new mascot in the middle of a season.

=== The Italian goes missing ===
On February 27, 2013, news outlets reported that the Italian sausage costume was missing. According to police, eyewitnesses saw someone wearing the costume leaving the Milwaukee Curling Club in suburban Cedarburg the evening of February 16, proceeding to visit several bars in the area and pose for photographs with patrons before disappearing. Rewards offered for the costume's safe return included year's supplies of mustard and sauerkraut from local businesses, but these went unclaimed as the costume was ultimately dropped off in a hurry at a Cedarburg bar on February 28 by two unidentified men.

=== 20th anniversary celebration ===
On June 27, 2013, the Brewers and Klements sausage marked the 20th anniversary of the Sausage Race. The festivities, held during that day's Brewers game against the Chicago Cubs at American Family Field, featured pregame ceremonies honoring the Racing Sausages, a ceremonial first pitch by Michael Dillon (winner of the first live-action race in 1993), and the regular Sausage Race in the middle of the 6th inning that featured only 3 competitors—original entrants bratwurst, Polish sausage, and Italian sausage (the hot dog and chorizo held the tape at the finish line).

2026 World Series

The 2026 World Series saw the Sausage Race make its World Series debut, as the race had not yet existed during the Brewers' last World Series appearance in 1982. The Italian Sausage won the Game 1 race to become the race's first–ever World Series winner. The Polish Sausage won the Game 2 race. The Racing Sausages continued racing during the watch parties held at the stadium for the last three games.

== Notable contestants ==
Ballplayers Mark Grace, Pat Meares, Geoff Jenkins, and Hideo Nomo have raced as sausages. A handful of sports journalists have also raced as well as former Green Bay Packers wide receiver Javon Walker, who participated in the race in 2004. Casey McGehee's son Mack has raced as a Little Weenie. Dan Patrick and the "Danettes" of The Dan Patrick Show raced in the June 22, 2013, race with Andrew "McLovin" Perloff winning as the Hot Dog.

On February 24, 2014, a small stray dog wandered into the Brewers' spring training camp. The team adopted him and named him Hank after Hank Aaron. He ran his first sausage race with the team on February 27, 2014. Despite losing the race, Hank is popular with the team and has his own X account.

On August 20, 2021, late-night TV host Stephen Colbert made a guest appearance as part of his ‘Milwaukee Apology Tour’. He was in the Hot Dog costume and finished last.

Baseball media team members from Jomboy Media competed as the sausages in August 2021. During their race, Jomboy founder James O'Brien pulled his hamstring and fell.

Participation is not open to the general public.

== See also ==
- Mascot race
- Presidents Race
- Great Pierogi Race
