= Hank (dog) =

Major League Baseball mascot (died 2024)

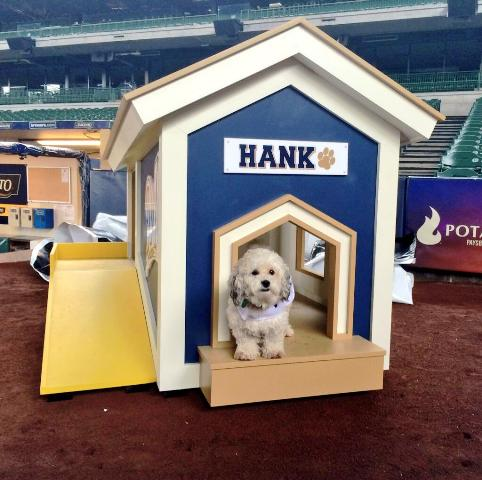
- Hank in his mobile dog house
- Species: Canis familiaris
- Breed: Bichon Frise mixed-breed
- Sex: Male
- Born: c. 2012
- Died: September 12, 2024 (aged 12–13); Whitefish Bay, Wisconsin, U.S.
- Nationality: American
- Notable role: Unofficial mascot of the Milwaukee Brewers
- Owner: Wronski family
- Appearance: White with grey
- Named after: Hank Aaron

Hank (c. 2012 – September 12, 2024), also known as Hank T. Dog, was an unofficial mascot of the Milwaukee Brewers of Major League Baseball. Believed to be a part-Bichon Frise mixed-breed, Hank was rescued by the Brewers when he wandered into their spring training facility before the start of the 2014 season at about two or three years of age.

== Background ==
Hank was a stray dog when he wandered around the fields of the spring training facility of the Milwaukee Brewers, located at Maryvale Baseball Park in Phoenix, Arizona, on February 17, 2014. Hank was first spotted by security guards, and was then taken inside the facility by Brewers coach Ed Sedar. Hank weighed 11 pounds (5.0 kg), had been run over by a car, and had two chipped teeth.

Team officials attempted to find an owner, and when one could not be found, they rescued Hank. They took him to a veterinarian, where he was treated for a laceration. The organization named him Hank in honor of Hank Aaron. Hank competed in a Sausage Race during a spring training game wearing a hot dog costume on February 26.

== Reactions ==
Hank's story went viral on social media, and was covered by many news outlets. The Brewers received over 1,000 requests to adopt Hank. Towards the end of spring training, the Brewers announced that Hank would remain with the team. He was included on a charter flight to Milwaukee in March; its arrival at Mitchell International Airport was attended by Chris Abele, the county executive for Milwaukee County, and Tom Barrett, the mayor of Milwaukee. Fans met Hank at Miller Park in Milwaukee. The team unveiled official Hank-themed merchandise. Over 1,000 shirts, bearing the name "Hank" and the number "K9", were sold on the first day. The Brewers donated 20% of the proceeds to the Wisconsin Humane Society at the end of the 2014 MLB season. By 2016, Hank and the Brewers had raised more than $300,000.

Hank was adopted by Marti Wronski, the Brewers' vice president and general counsel, and her family, who live in Whitefish Bay, Wisconsin. Hank was believed to be between two and three years old and a bichon frise mixed-breed. The Brewers had him attend many, but not all, home games. By Opening Day, Hank's weight had increased to 15 pounds (6.8 kg).

Bernie Brewer, the Brewers' official mascot, led Hank onto the field during introductions on Opening Day. The next day, Hank had neutering surgery. Hank had a Bobblehead giveaway on September 13, 2014. Hank met baseball legend Hank Aaron on August 21, 2014. In January 2015, Hank won the Golden Hydrant award when he was named Dog of the Year at the inaugural World Dog Awards. On May 10, 2015, Hank had another bobblehead giveaway in his honor.

== Death ==
By 2018, Hank had limited public appearances, with a Brewers official saying the dog was not officially retired but "deserves to live the life of a loved pet."

On September 12, 2024, Hank's owners announced that he had died, with the Brewers also announcing his death.

== See also ==
- List of individual dogs
