= Mrs. T's Pierogies =

Brand of dumplings

- Founded: Shenandoah, Pennsylvania (1952)
- Founders: Ted Twardzik
- Headquarters: Shenandoah, Pennsylvania, United States
- Parent: Ateeco, Inc
- Website: www.mrstspierogies.com

Mrs. T's Pierogies is a mass market brand of pierogi in the United States. It is a product of Ateeco, Inc., based in Shenandoah, Pennsylvania.

== History ==
The company was founded in 1952 by Ted Twardzik (1927–2016). It manufactures fourteen varieties of pierogi and produces more than 900 million pierogi per year. In the full-sized line, the varieties include: 4 Cheese Medley, 5 Cheese Pizza, American Cheese, Broccoli & Aged Cheddar, Classic Cheddar, Classic Onion, Feta & Spinach, Garlic & Parmesan, Jalapeño & Sharp Cheddar, Loaded Baked Potato, Savory 5 Cheese Blend, Sour Cream and Chive, and Traditional Sauerkraut.

The company sponsors the Great Pierogi Race at home games of the Pittsburgh Pirates.
