= Mascot race =

Sports entertainment event

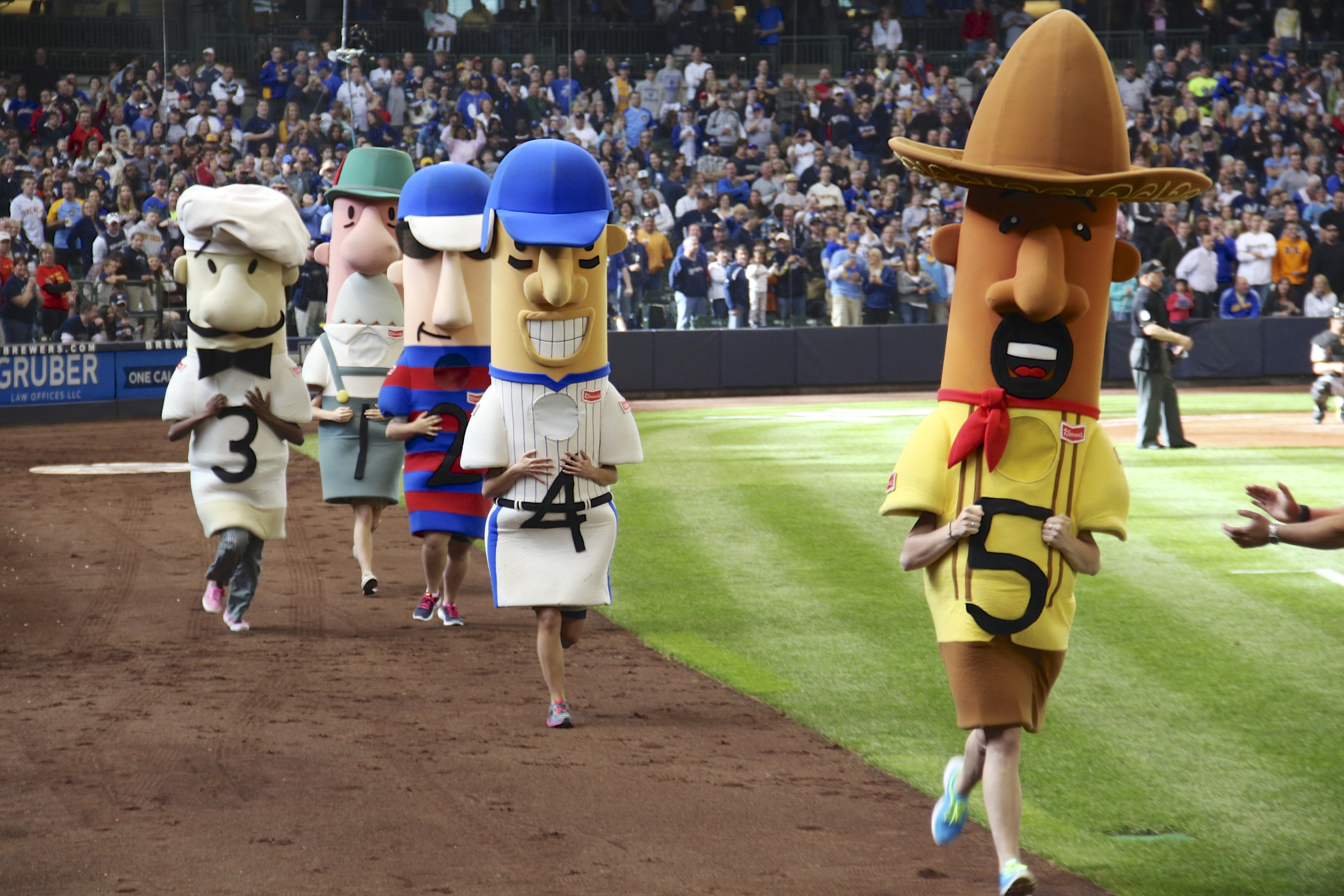
The Milwaukee Brewers' racing sausages

A mascot race is a promotional sports entertainment or charity competition consisting of costumed runners racing around a baseball field or race course, usually as a form of between-innings entertainment. The racers are typically anthropomorphized inanimate objects or mascots related to local culture, a sponsor's products, or sport culture. The outcomes of races can both be decided in a legitimate race or may be predetermined for purely entertainment purposes.

The world's largest ever mascot race was the Sue Ryder Mascot Gold Cup held at Wetherby Racecourse in West Yorkshire, United Kingdom, on April 26, 2015. The race featured 131 mascots with 125 of them completing the 1 kilometre (0.62 mi) distance and becoming the new Guinness World Record for most mascots in a race. The winning mascot was the Red Marauder entered by the Ingmanthorpe Racing Stables and helped to victory by Scottish international footballer Gary McAllister.

== Races ==
=== Major League Baseball ===
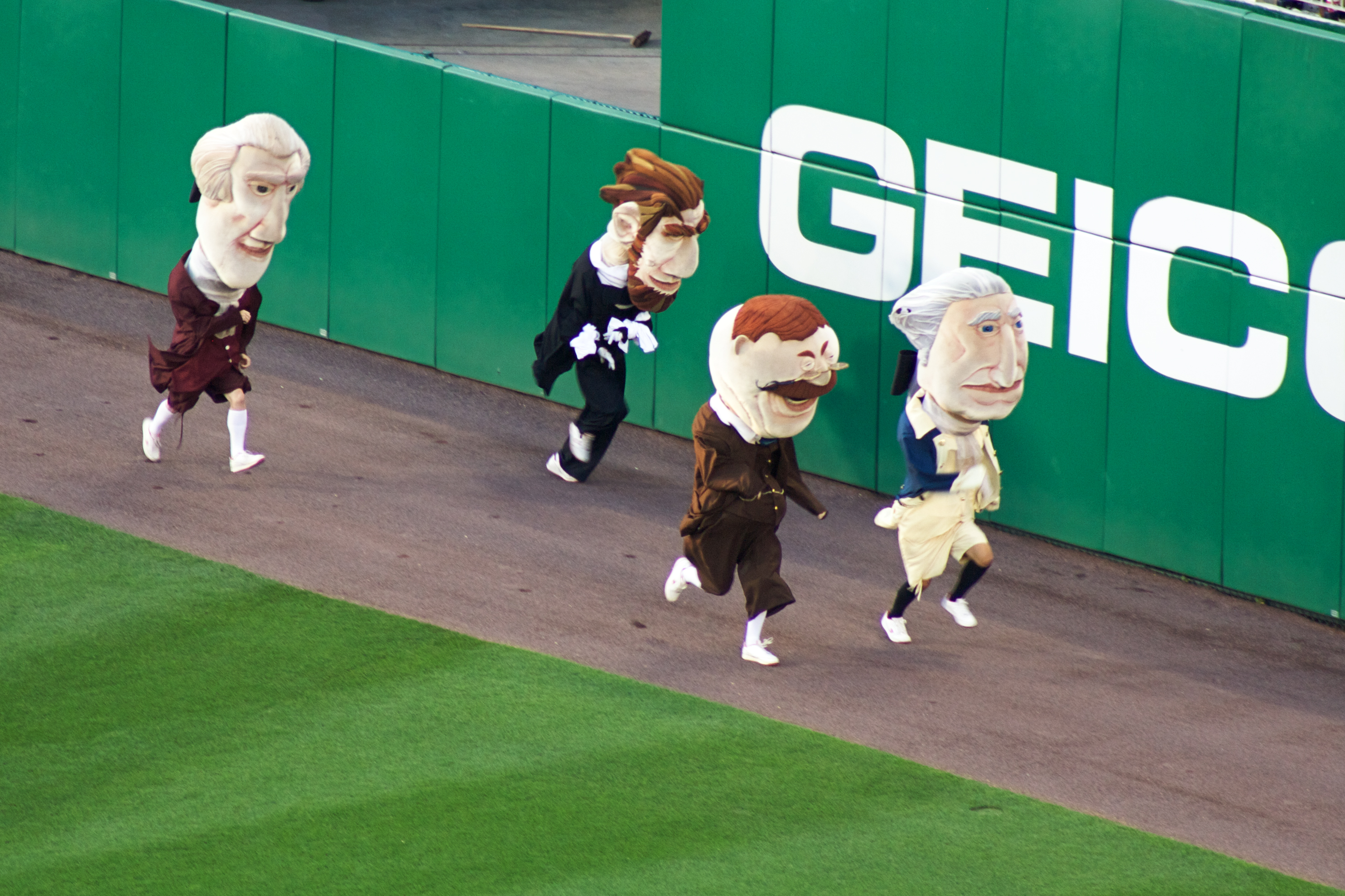
The Washington Nationals' racing presidents

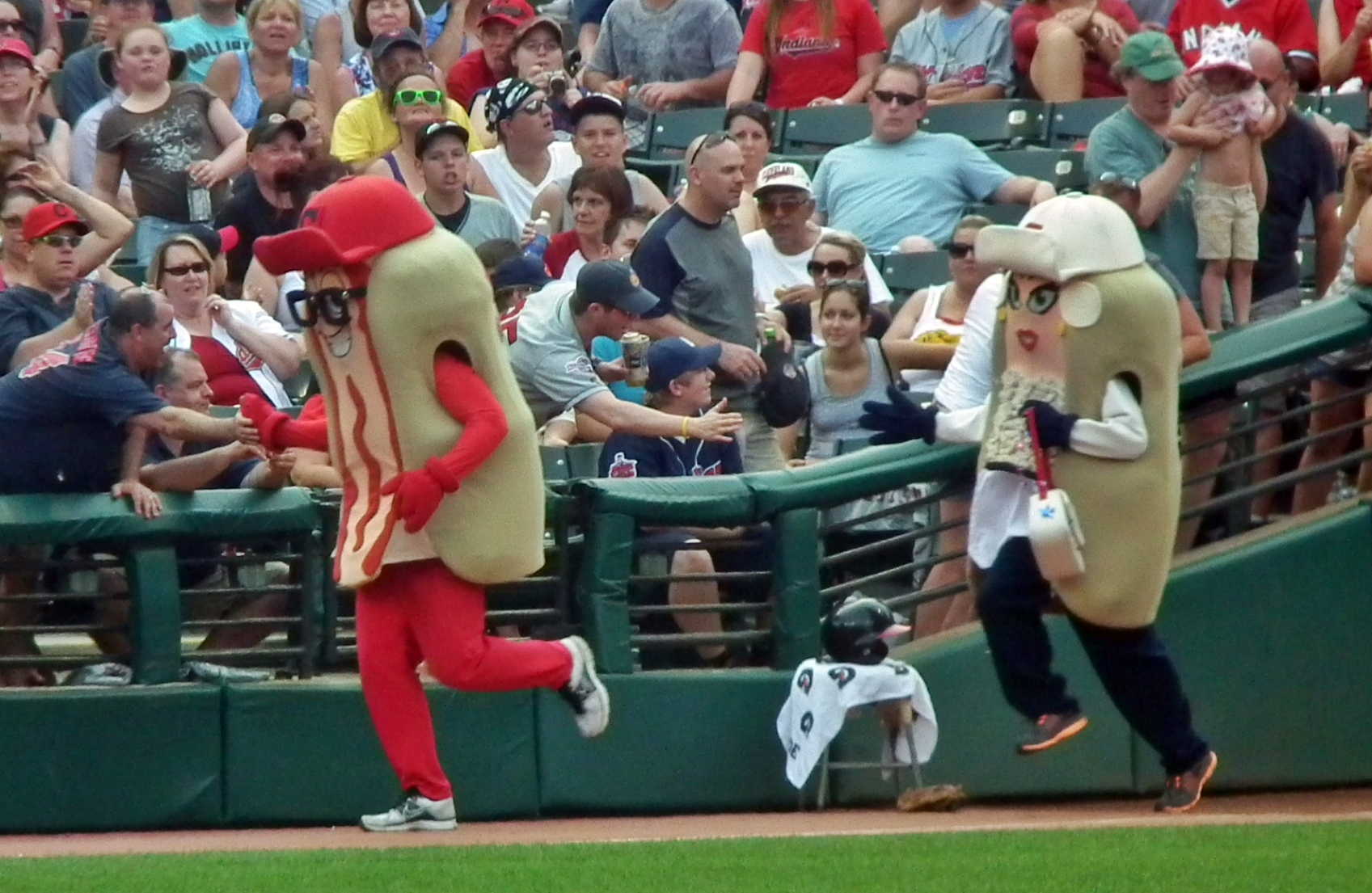
The Cleveland Guardians' racing hot dogs

The best-known of this type of race is the Milwaukee Brewers' Sausage Race. Introduced in the early 1990s, the race features bratwurst, Polish sausage, Italian sausage, hot dog, and chorizo characters. The race takes place before the sixth inning of every home game. Players have also been involved; during a 2003 race during a Brewers–Pittsburgh Pirates game, Pirates slugger Randall Simon hit one of the sausages with a baseball bat, causing the woman in the costume to require medical care. Milwaukee police fined Simon.

The Sausage Race inspired the creation of the Great Pierogi Race in Pittsburgh. A rivalry has developed between the Sausages and the Pierogies, and the two groups compete twice yearly in relay races. Another well-known mascot race is the Presidents Race of the Washington Nationals. George Washington, Thomas Jefferson, Abraham Lincoln, and Theodore Roosevelt, mascots compete. A William Howard Taft mascot also raced from 2013 to 2016, as did a Calvin Coolidge mascot in 2015 and a Herbert Hoover mascot in 2016; as of 2017, the Taft, Coolidge, and Hoover mascots had "retired to Florida" to race only in Nationals spring training games. As a running joke, Teddy Roosevelt did not win from the beginning of the Presidents Race in 2006 until the Nationals made the playoffs for the first time in 2012. Like the Milwaukee Sausages, the Presidents also had a rivalry with the Pierogies.

Other teams have their own versions. The Tampa Bay Rays have a race sponsored by PepsiCo, the owners of the naming rights to Tropicana Field. Their race is between large bottles of Pepsi, Pepsi Max, Aquafina, and Sierra Mist. Before 2007, these were computer-generated. As of 2010, the race is only computer-generated for certain games.

The Cleveland Guardians and the Kansas City Royals have similar races involving hot dogs. The Royals' version features live runners dressed as Heinz condiments – ketchup, relish and mustard. The live racers made their first appearance during the 2007 season, with the race being limited to the video board prior to this. The Guardians also started a live hot dog race in 2007 with the racers being mustard, onion, and ketchup (who wears thick glasses as a nod to Charlie Sheen's "Wild Thing" character from the movie Major League). In late 2007 the ketchup racer started cutting the corner at home plate to win the race, and this "cheating" has led to several stage skits by players, mascots, and the ground crew to slow or trip him up during the race.

The New York Mets race cardboard automobiles. As of May 29, 2016, they include an anthropomorphized police car, fire truck, yellow cab and black limo. As of May 29, 2016, Freddie the Firetruck leads the 2016 series with 9 wins, including the two most recent Sunday races.

Texas Rangers games feature a live action version of the "Dot Race", in which three dots (Red, Green, and Blue) compete in the middle of the sixth inning. Each fan is given a coupon for Ozarka bottled water (the race sponsor) that has one of the three colors. A coupon with the "winning color" can be taken to a Texas store to purchase Ozarka (in actuality, the coupons do not feature the date they were presented, thus any coupon can be redeemed at any time prior to their expiration date). The "dots" were later joined by three action figures, all resembling figures in Texas history (Davy Crockett with his long rifle, Jim Bowie with his Bowie knife, and Sam Houston).

The Atlanta Braves race involves (Atlanta-based) Home Depot's hammer, saw (later replaced by a bucket after suffering a serious injury), paint brush, and power drill racing against each other. Before the 2009 season, the race was seen only on the scoreboard, but it now features live runners dressed in costumed versions of these tools; the race takes place on the warning track and starts in right field and ends in front of the scoreboard.

In 2009 the San Francisco Giants featured periodically a bobble head race with likenesses of announcers Duane Kuiper and Mike Krukow, but they only occasionally raced in 2009.

The Arizona Diamondbacks dress three children up in hot dog suits – one representing ketchup, one representing mustard and one representing relish. The three kids run in place in front of the Diamondbacks' dugout while the scoreboard shows a race between the three hot dogs. The winner receives a prize for their victory.

The Houston Astros' race involves Taco Bell hot sauce packets named Fire, Hot, and Mild that race from the right field corner around the outfield and up to the visitors' dugout. This race started in 2010, but starting in the 2015 season the Astros introduced their new race, the Space Race, featuring three dressed in astronauts costume; they are Apollo, Squeeze, and Doc Rocket. Also in 2010, the Arizona Diamondbacks added a "Legends Race" with 10-foot (3.0 m) likenesses of Randy Johnson, Mark Grace, Luis Gonzalez and Matt Williams. The race debuted on July 2. The Diamondbacks previously had a race between live runners dressed as menu items from fast-food chain and sponsor Taco Bell, including a giant cup of Pepsi. The Mark Grace figure finally won his first race August 8, 2015, on the day Randy Johnson's number was retired; Johnson let him pass him for the win. Mark Grace won another race on October 3, leading the race from beginning to end.

In 2012, the Minnesota Twins introduced “The Race at Target Field” mascot race—an evolution of their "Race to Target Field" animated video race which began in 2009 for the inaugural season of Target Field. The race features five Minnesota-inspired characters: Louie the loon, Wanda the walleye, Babe the blue ox, Skeeta the mosquito and Bullseye the dog (mascot of hometown company and sponsor, Target Corporation).

Also in 2012, the Miami Marlins added the Great Sea race featuring Bob the Shark, Julio the Octopus, Angel the Stone Crab and Spike the Sea Dragon.

On August 3, 2013, the Oakland Athletics held the first Hall of Famer Big Head race, featuring mascot versions of Rickey Henderson, Rollie Fingers, and Dennis Eckersley. As of 2024, it is still being run at home games.

To start the 2014 MLB season, the Detroit Tigers introduced some new automobile mascots to pay homage to the city's automotive history. They started with three mascots, "Bella Air" (a 1957 Chevrolet Bel Air), "Corey Vette" (a 1956 Chevrolet Corvette), and "Petey Pickup" (a 1950's Chevrolet Task Force pickup truck). Due to their success, those mascots were joined to start the 2015 season by "Cam Aro" (a 1966 Chevrolet Camaro) and "Shelley Chevelle" (a 1964 Chevrolet Chevelle). These promotional mascots race near the middle of ballgames at Comerica Park.

For the 2019 MLB London Series in June 2019, organizers held a fan vote to select four costumed entrants for a mascot race; chosen were: Winston Churchill, Freddie Mercury, King Henry VIII and the Loch Ness Monster.

In 2024, the Seattle Mariners debuted the Salmon Run as their mascot race. The four racers are King, Sockeye, Silver, and Humpy.

The Baltimore Orioles had hot dog race on the video board since the opening of Oriole Park at Camden Yards which featuring Ketchup, Mustard, and Relish. On Memorial Day, May 27, 2024, live-action of the hot dog race debut consist of Ketchup as a kid son, Mustard as a father with mustache, and relish as a mother with eyelashes and curly hairs. All three wear an O's cap just like the team's mascot The Bird, and has the Orioles wordmark squirted in their respective condiments. In the 2024 season they appeared in selected games, but for the 2025 season they appeared at all Orioles' home game, due to their popularity.

=== Minor League Baseball ===
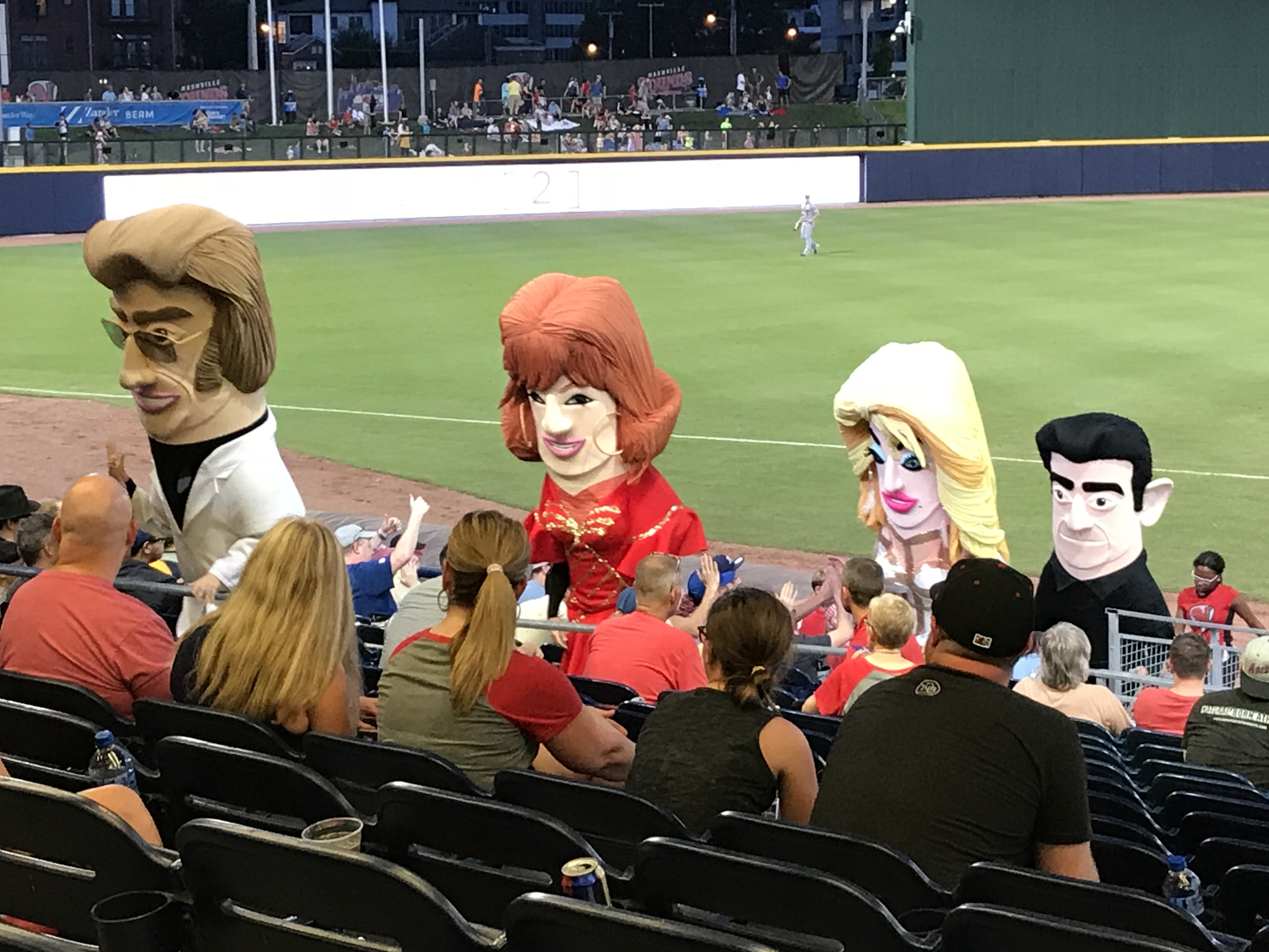
The Nashville Sounds' racing country music legends

- Altoona Curve (Double-A Eastern League) – Mama Randazzo's Meatball Race, featuring the meatballs Maria, Marco and Giuseppe.
- Albuquerque Isotopes (Triple-A Pacific Coast League) – Local New Mexican food staples Red Chile, Green Chile, Taco, and a jar of Salsa compete in a Chile Race.
- Buffalo Bisons (Triple-A International League) – In a reference to the city's namesake Buffalo wings, the Wing, Cheese, Celery Race (or WCC Race) was first held in 2011. The primary competitors (a chicken wing, a dish of bleu cheese, and a celery stalk) are occasionally joined by Atomic Wing, a fiery hot chicken wing. Celery, which had lost his first 449 races, announced it would retire following the 2017 season. Following an extensive media circus, Celery won his last race to finish with a career record of 1–449. He was replaced the next season by a beef on weck sandwich and a carrot. This race has crossed over to the National Hockey League's Buffalo Sabres intermissions on occasion.
- Columbus Clippers (Triple-A International League) – The team's Hot Dog Race features hot dog varieties, Kenny Ketchup, Mickey Mustard, and Ricky Relish.
- Durham Bulls (Triple-A International League) – The team's race features Crash Davis, "Nuke" LaLoosh and Annie Savoy from the movie Bull Durham depicts the team.
- Inland Empire 66ers (Single-A California League) - The 66ers hold a race entitled "The Pineapple Express", in which three pineapples named Petey, Patty, and James Franco compete for glory. The third pineapple is named James Franco in reference to his role in the film Pineapple Express.
- Jersey Shore BlueClaws (High-A South Atlantic League) – The BlueClaws hold two between-inning races under the collective title, Buster's Grand Prix. Race number one is the Pork Roll, Egg, and Cheese Race at the end of the second inning with a slice of pork roll, a fried egg, and a slice of cheese. The Eyeball Race features three running eyeballs (with a blue iris, green iris, and brown iris) in the middle of the sixth inning.
- Lehigh Valley IronPigs (Triple-A International League) – The Pork Race pits Chris P. Bacon (a slice of bacon), Diggity (a hot dog), Hambone (a slice of ham), and Barbie-Q (a pulled pork barbecue sandwich) in a race around Coca-Cola Park. In 2018, a fifth racer, Ribbie (a rack of ribs), joins the group.
- Nashville Sounds (Triple-A International League) – Established in 2016, the Country Legends Race, held in the middle of the fifth inning, pits caricatures of country music stars Johnny Cash, George Jones, Reba McEntire, and Dolly Parton in a race around the warning track from center field to the home plate side of the first base dugout at First Horizon Park. Nashville is known as Music City for its association with the country music industry.
- Rancho Cucamonga Quakes (Single-A California League) - The "Dino Derby" involves three dinosaurs: Triceratops, Pterodactyl, and T-Rex. Usually, the Triceratops would win despite being one of the stubbiest of all dinosaurs.
- Sacramento RiverCats (Triple-A Pacific Coast League) - Given their location walking distance from the Capitol of the state of California, the Sacramento RiverCats host a mascot race between the "Heads of State" of Arnie, Ronnie, and Gray, corresponding to former California Governors you may recall: Ronald Reagan, Arnold Schwarzenegger, and Gray Davis.
- Salt Lake Bees (Triple-A Pacific Coast League) - The "Produce Race" features a few fans racing in full fruit and vegetable costumes, a promotion conceived by Smith's, a supermarket chain, who also owns naming rights to the Bees' stadium, Smith's Ballpark
- Scranton/Wilkes-Barre RailRiders (Triple-A International League) – The "Yankees Legends" Race features oversized caricatures of several famous New York Yankees players, such as Joe DiMaggio, Mickey Mantle, Billy Martin, and Thurman Munson.
- Somerset Patriots (Double-A Eastern League) - The "Healthy Choices" Race features a costumed apple, carrot, and blueberry that is sponsored by Horizon Blue Cross Blue Shield. In the late 2010's, a fourth contestant known as the Veggie Burger joined. It is always done at the end of the sixth inning.
- Stockton Ports (Class A California League) – The Asparagus Race features three varieties of asparagus (Regular, Fried, and Chocolate) in a 90-foot race in the middle of the sixth inning. The eight-foot-tall competitors are named Bernie, Blanche, and Lil Hank, respectively. The Stockton area produces the majority of the domestic asparagus consumed in the United States.
- Washington Wild Things (Independent Frontier League) – The Hot Dog Race features a racing hot dog and bottles of mustard and ketchup.
- West Virginia Black Bears (MLB Draft League) – The Morgantown, West Virginia-based Black Bears have "The Great Pepperoni Roll Race" similar to their MLB affiliate Pittsburgh Pirates "The Great Pierogi Race" except the mascots are pepperoni rolls (a popular West Virginia state food). The mascots include Pepperoni and Cheese Patty, Hot Pepper Hank, and Double Stuffed Dave. Double Stuffed Dave has yet to win a race. (Both the Black Bears and Bisons share common ownership under Bob Rich Jr.)
- Winston-Salem Dash (High-A South Atlantic League) – The Pepper Dash features Petey Poblano, a poblano with a personality based on Petey Pablo's "Raise Up", Chill-E Pepper, a generic chili pepper, Halle Peño, a female jalapeño, and Nana Pepper, a grandmother banana pepper. Each has a signature win song.

=== Other ===
The Mascot Gold Cup, originally known as the Mascot Steeplechase, was devised by The Yorkshire Federation of Young Farmers Clubs in 2006 and is held at Wetherby Racecourse, West Yorkshire, United Kingdom.
