= Screech (mascot) =

Washington Nationals mascot

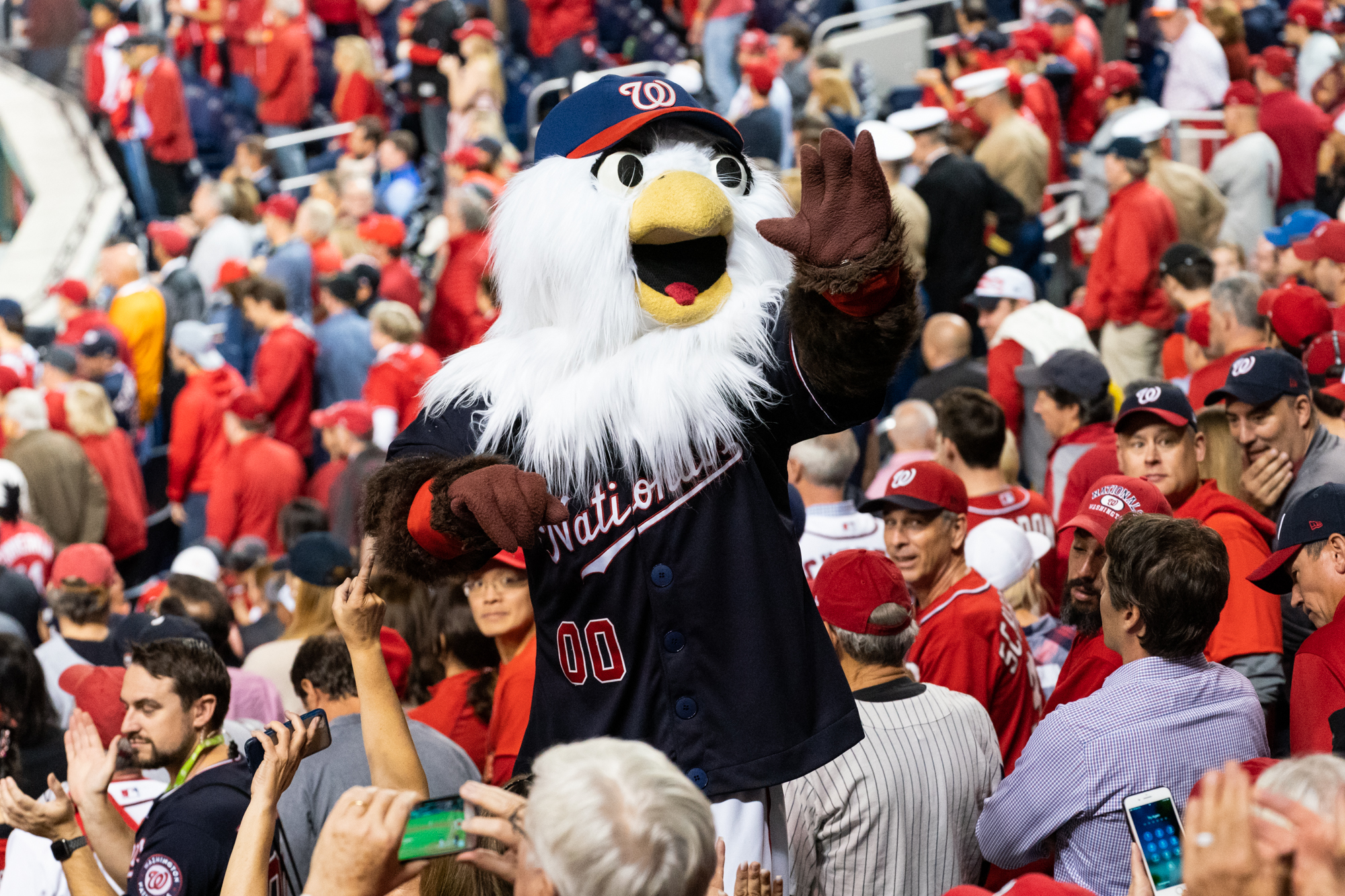
- Screech during the 2019 World Series
- Team: Washington Nationals
- Description: Bald eagle wearing a Nationals cap and jersey
- Origin of name: The sound made by a bald eagle
- First seen: April 17, 2005
- Website: Official Website

Screech is the mascot of the Washington Nationals. He is a bald eagle that wears the home cap and jersey of the team. He was "hatched" on April 17, 2005 at the "Kids Opening Day" promotion at RFK Stadium. Screech’s name is based on the sound that is made by actual bald eagles. A nine-year-old fourth grade student in Washington, D.C., Glenda Gutierrez, designed the mascot and won a contest sponsored by the team and explained that it was "strong and eats almost everything."

In 2009, the Nationals unveiled a redesigned Screech. The new costume, designed by Major League Baseball's design department, made the mascot slimmer and gave the mascot a removable cap. The Nationals explained that the original design was of an eagle that was always intended to grow up one day. A Nationals official described him as "like a teenager now". The 2012 Topps Opening Day card described Screech as a dazzling dancer, full of loyal shenanigans directed at the opposing team.

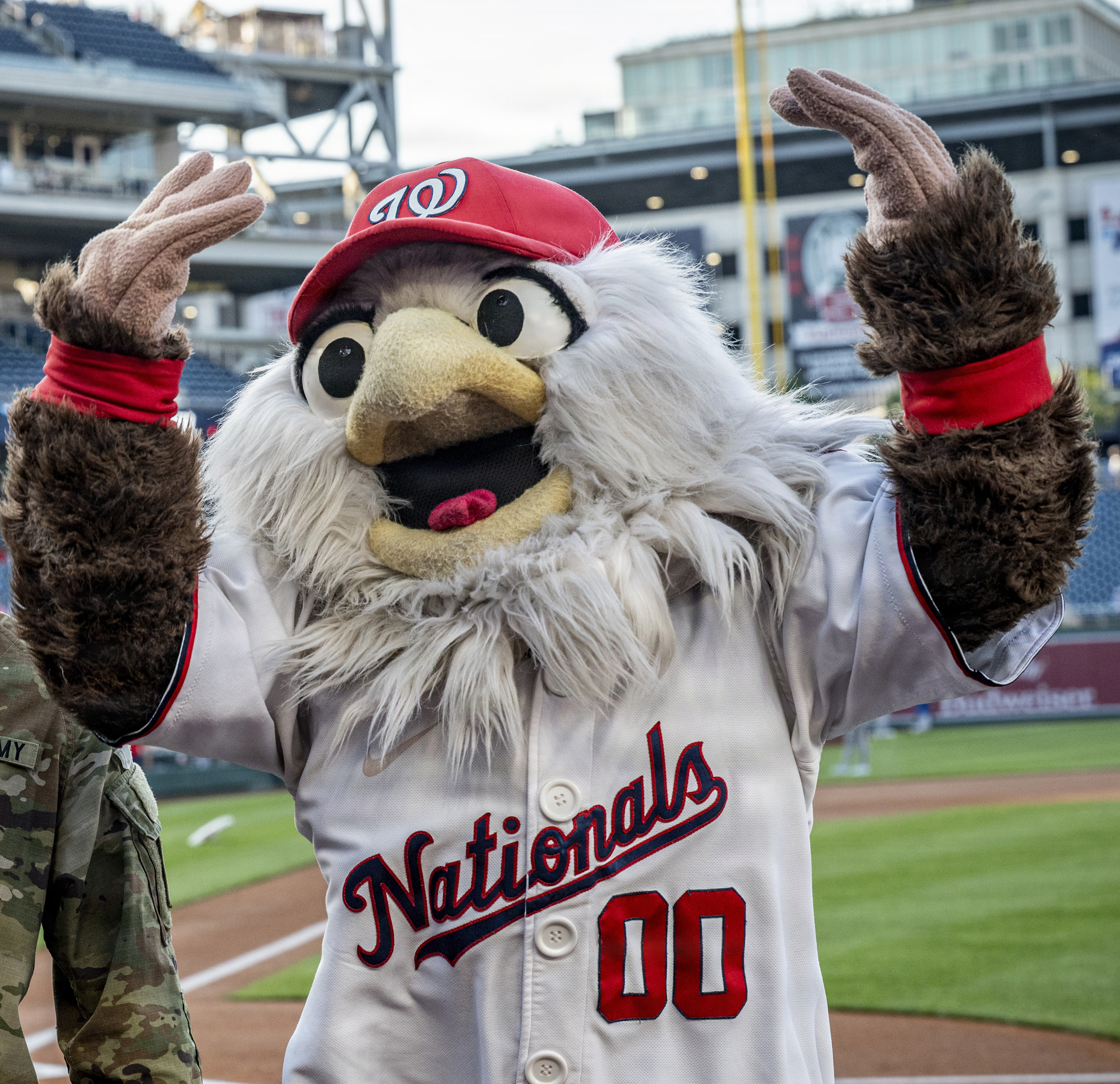
Screech in 2026

In subsequent years, the team created a number of in-stadium traditions around the mascot. Screech became the official judge of the team's Presidents Race and carries a flag around the field after victories. An annual "Kids Opening Day" event, held on a Sunday home game each April, was expanded to include a celebration of Screech's birthday. Additional costumes were added, including a special birthday hat, rain gear worn after rain delays, a Jedi robe worn on Star Wars Day, and pajamas worn during extra innings of late night games.

== See also ==
- List of Major League Baseball mascots
- Presidents Race, a mascot race that takes place in the middle of the fourth inning of every Nationals game
- Youppi!, the preceding mascot of the franchise when it was based in Montreal as the Expos, and current mascot of hockey's Montreal Canadiens
