= Pirate Parrot =

Mascot of the Pittsburgh Pirates baseball team

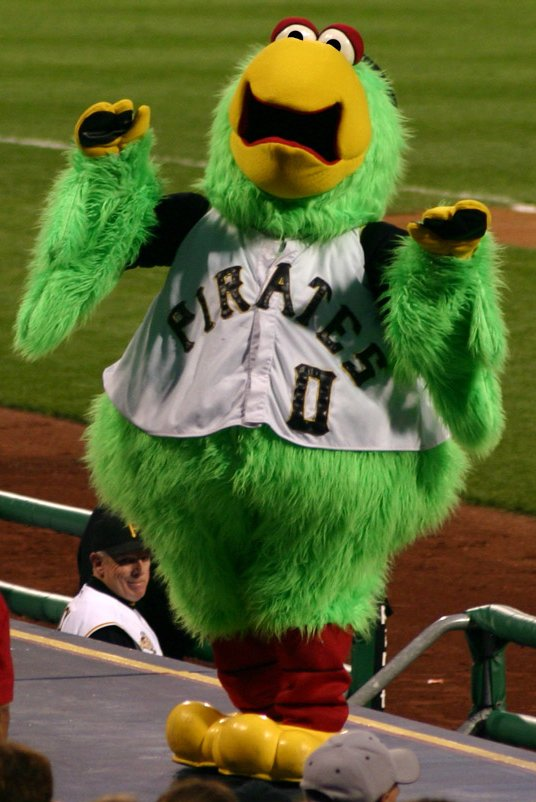
- The Pirate Parrot in 2006
- Team: Pittsburgh Pirates
- Description: Large, green parrot
- First seen: 1979
- Website: Official website

The Pirate Parrot is a costumed mascot of the Pittsburgh Pirates of Major League Baseball. He was introduced in 1979 to boost sagging attendance and was inspired by the success of rival mascot Phillie Phanatic, which the Philadelphia Phillies introduced the year before.

== History ==
The parrot character was derived from the classic story Treasure Island by Robert Louis Stevenson, most notably the one owned by Long John Silver named "Captain Flint".

The Pirates put out a casting call for highly-energetic candidates, hoping to find a comedic talent similar to Robin Williams, and selected Kevin Koch after an extensive audition day due to his disco dance skills. The Parrot debuted on April Fools' Day, 1979 when he "hatched" at Three Rivers Stadium. That year, the "We Are Family" Pirates won the World Series.

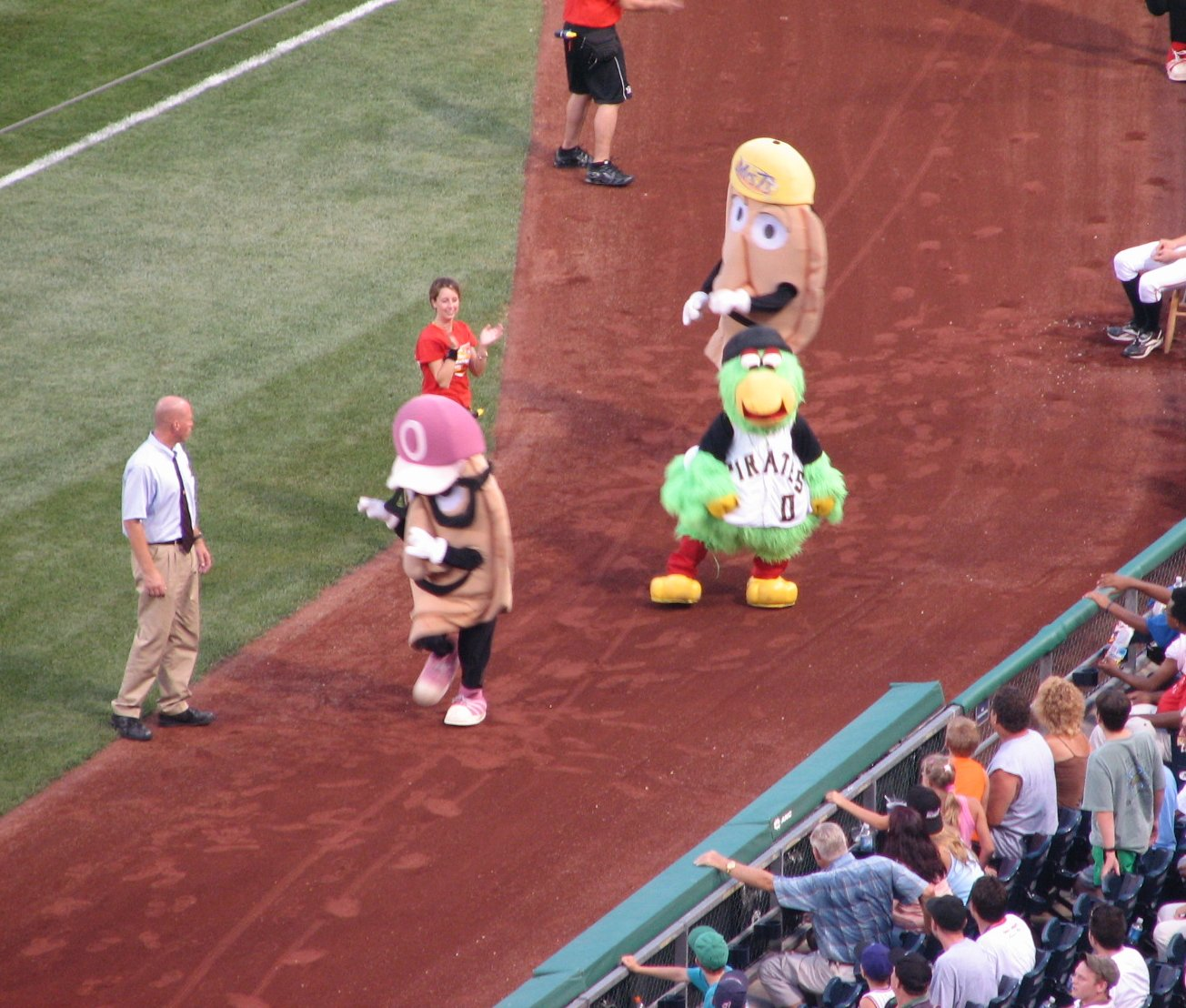
The Pirate Parrot getting involved in the Great Pierogi Race, seen with Oliver Onion and Cheese Chester

The Pirate Parrot's initial appearance, from 1979 to 1980, was thinner and "meaner", like the San Diego Chicken, and donned traditional pirate garb such as a captain's hat, vest, and a Jolly Roger flag. His dancing and gyrating were popular with fans, but he bothered some staff and players. In one game, an older grounds crew member kicked the Pirate Parrot in the head and threw a rake at him after the character jumped on the man's back.

After a year, the Parrot was redesigned to be larger and more goofy-looking. "We think fat is funny", explained the Pirates promotion director. The Pirate Parrot costume became three times heavier and its new outfit was a Pirates jersey and backwards baseball cap. In 1995, the Parrot was briefly paired with a secondary mascot, the Buccaneer, who was quickly dropped after its actor was arrested for skinny dipping.

The Parrot has become a staple within the Pittsburgh region, often appearing at events and Pirates team functions. He often appears in ads for the team on television. He has been embraced more in Pittsburgh among older fans than Steely McBeam of the Pittsburgh Steelers, and along with Iceburgh of the Pittsburgh Penguins serves as one of two bird-based mascots in Pittsburgh. In May 1986 the Pirate Parrot joined in the Pittsburgh section of Hands Across America.

The three Pittsburgh mascots have been known to "fight" each other. In 2008, a parody attack ad based on the then-upcoming Presidential election was made to "attack" the Parrot, due to the Pirates then-16 consecutive losing seasons while the Penguins went on to lose in the Stanley Cup Finals to the Detroit Red Wings earlier in the year. (The Pens would win the Stanley Cup the following year.) The following year, all three mascots took part in a groundbreaking of an expansion of the National Aviary in Pittsburgh, with Steely McBeam tossing dirt at the Parrot's feet.

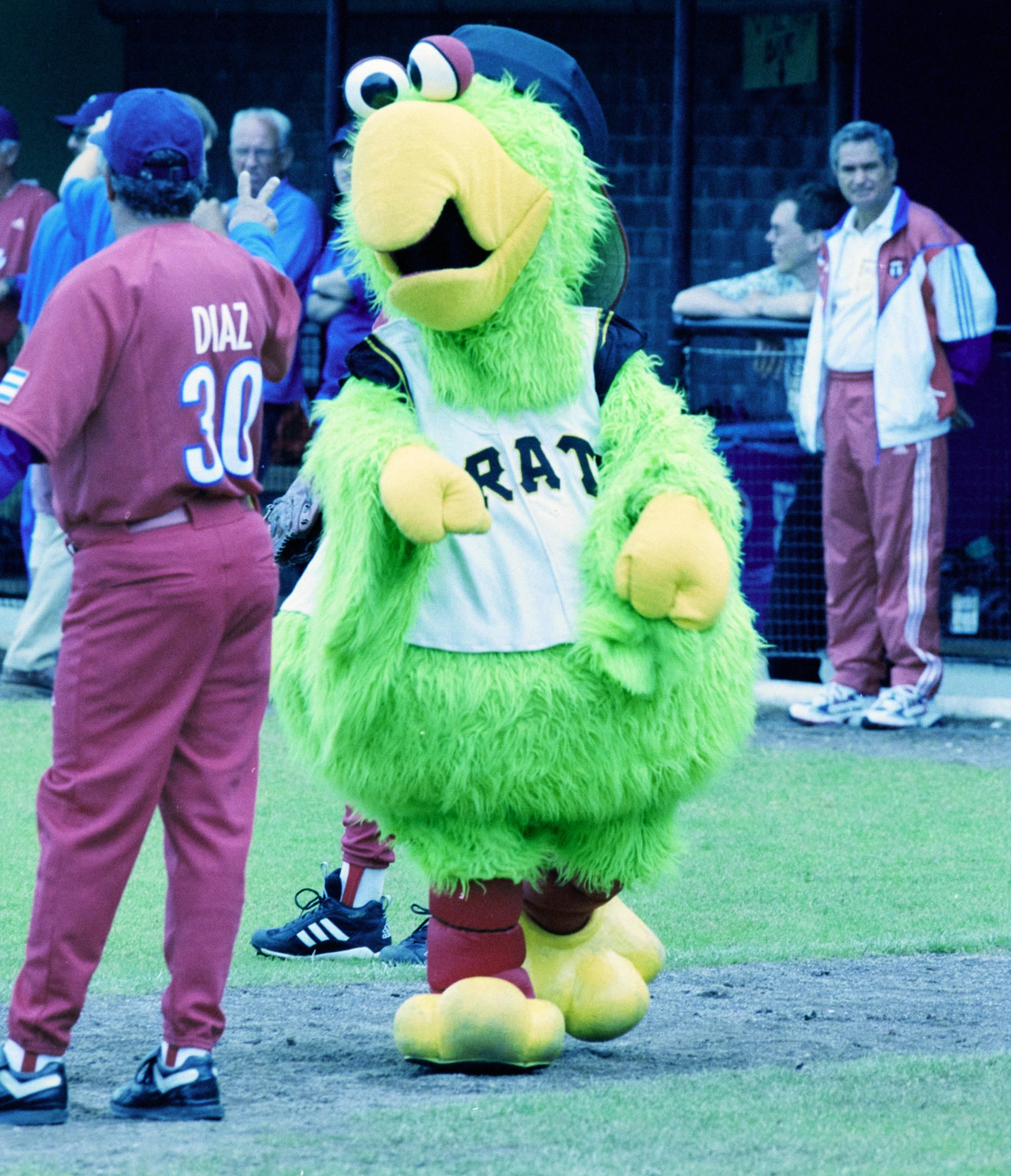
The Parrot in the Netherlands in 2001

In some cases, the Parrot has accompanied the Pirates on road trips if the game is in close proximity to Pittsburgh. For instance, the Parrot appeared at two games for the Pirates during a weekend interleague series against the Cleveland Indians in Cleveland in 2012, with the Parrot having friendly interactions with the Indians mascot, Slider, and even assisting Slider in interfering with Cleveland's Hot Dog Race, much like what the Parrot does with the Great Pierogi Race.

According to the Pirates official website, the mascot hopes to eventually be inducted into the Mascot Hall of Fame. He was nominated in 2025 and also in 2026, but was not chosen for induction either years.

== Cocaine scandal ==
Kevin Koch was the original Pirate Parrot for seven years after its debut in 1979, selected over 97 other applicants for his energetic nature and talented disco performance during his audition. Popular among fans for his lively dancing, Koch reportedly lost 17 pounds his first season due intense physical activity and sweating.

In 1985, it was discovered that Koch had used cocaine during several games and introduced players to cocaine by serving as middle man between drug dealers and players. Koch resigned that year and has expressed regret for doing cocaine and sharing it with the players. Despite the scandal, the Pirates kept the Parrot.
