= Great Pierogy Race =

Pittsburgh-originating mascot race

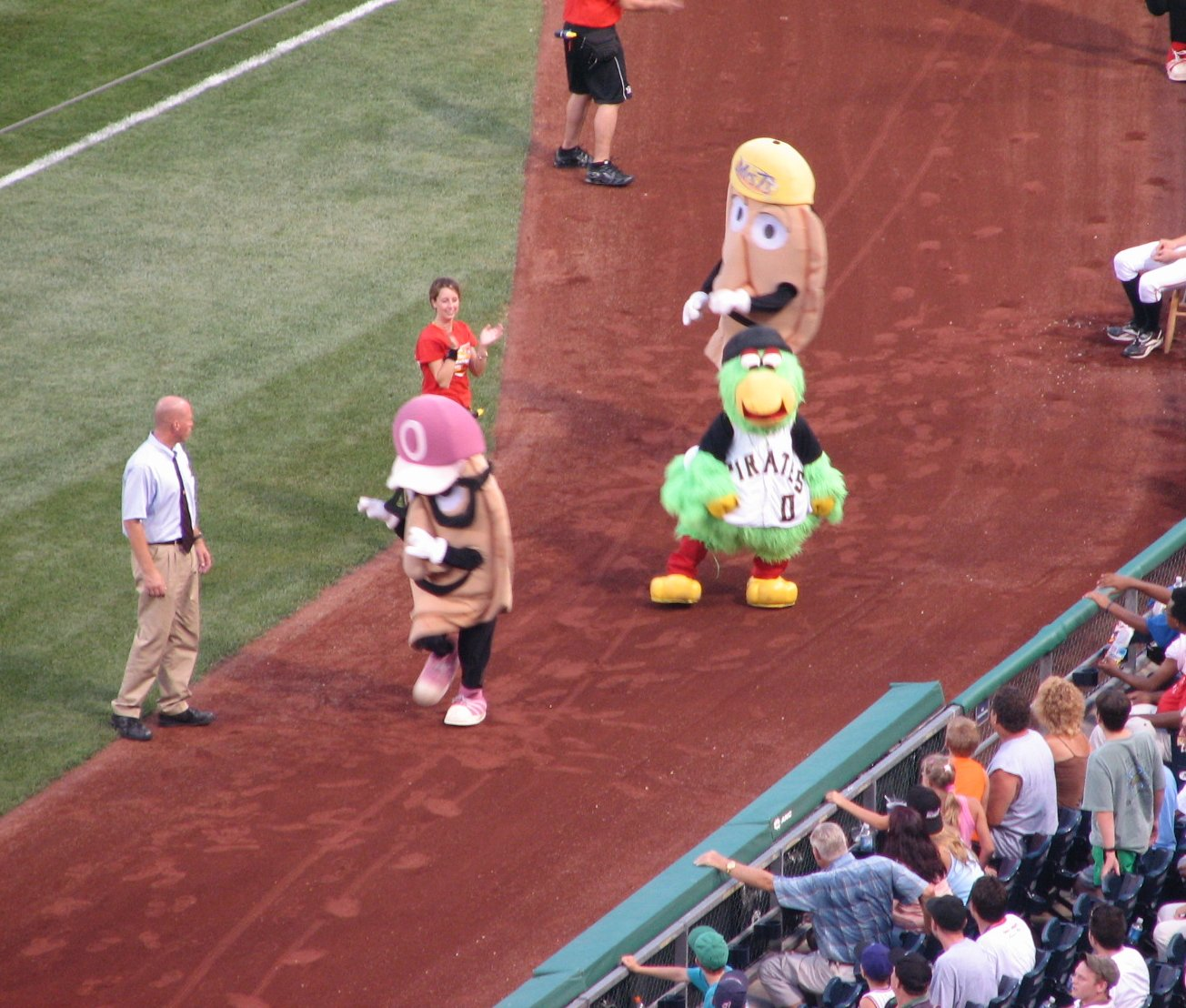
A pierogi race featuring (from left) Oliver Onion, Cheese Chester, and the Pirate Parrot.

The Great Pittsburgh Pierogi Race N'at, commonly called the Great Pierogi Race, is an American mascot race between innings during a Pittsburgh Pirates baseball game that features up to seven contestants racing in giant pierogi costumes: Potato Pete (blue hat), Jalapeño Anna (green hat), Cheese Chester (yellow hat), Sauerkraut Saul (red hat), Oliver Onion (purple hat), Bacon Burt (orange hat), and Pizza Penny (checkerboard red and white hat).

The pierogi travel once a year to American Family Field to take on the Milwaukee Brewers' racing sausages (the inspiration for the Pirates' version of the promotion) when the Pirates play the Brewers as well as to Nationals Park to take on the Washington Nationals' racing U.S. Presidents when the Pirates play the Nationals. Similarly, both the Brewers and Nationals bring their respective characters to PNC Park when they play in Pittsburgh.

The pierogi usually race in between the fifth and sixth innings and are often introduced to the opening tune to "Run Like Hell" from the Pink Floyd album The Wall and, since 2019, "Sabotage" by the Beastie Boys.

The races are televised on SportsNet Pittsburgh.

== History ==
=== 1999–2008 ===
To follow other MLB teams who had mascot races, Coordinator of In-Game Entertainment Eric Wolff was tasked to create a similar feature for the Pittsburgh Pirates in 1999 at Three Rivers Stadium, then the Pirates' home park. Not being a Pittsburgh-area native, Wolff struggled with knowing or creating something original for the city, stating, “The only thing here are old steel mills, beer, and too many fireworks.” While at a local friend’s family home for dinner on Easter Sunday, the traditional homemade potato and cheese stuffed pierogi were served with butter and sautéed onion. Wolff had never seen or tasted pierogi, so after listening to the family friend's mother and daughter explain the history of the regional specialty, the friends created the plan for Wolff (still not sold on the idea) to pitch the characters (using Pittsburghese “n’at”) with unique names to Wolff’s boss (jalapeño was added later and named for a member of the family, Hannah, although the flavor was not a traditional pierogi variety; another pierogi from “the homeland,” made with plum, didn’t make the lineup as it was deemed unappealing to mass audiences). The additional three pierogi characters were Potato Pete, Sauerkraut Saul, and Cheese Chester. The concept was approved and quickly became a fan favorite, and beanbags bearing the likeness of the different characters are given to children at certain ballgames as a promotion. A year or two after the Pirates moved to PNC Park, Oliver Onion was added and Potato Pete dropped, though Potato Pete continued to make occasional appearances.

In previous years, the race mainly took place as an animated sequence on the video board, showing the pierogi running through different sections of Pittsburgh and an announcer speaking Pittsburgh English to cover the race. The race culminated in the contestants running into the ballpark from right field, toward the visitors' dugout. Occasionally, the Pirate Parrot influenced the outcome of the race by distracting or knocking over contestants. A winner is determined and the leaderboard updated after the race. Often, a "humorous" disclaimer such as "No pierogies were harmed in the race" follows the leaderboard. A champion is crowned at the end of every season. At times, the Pirates will have faster runners wear costumes of pierogi that are behind in the races in order to keep the season-long competition "close." in effect making the races somewhat fixed. The event is sponsored by Mrs. T's Pierogies.

=== 2009–2013 ===
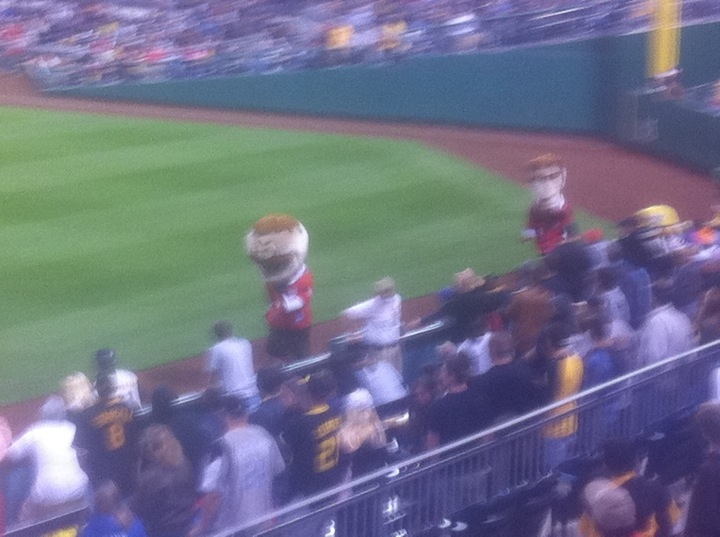
Teddy Roosevelt and Abraham Lincoln of the Presidents Race running the Great pierogi Race at PNC Park during a Pirates–Nationals game on April 23, 2011. Jalapeño Hannah won this race.

The animated sequence was dropped completely at the beginning of the 2009 season, and the "Yinzer" announcer was replaced in 2013 by PNC Park in-game host/co-public address announcer Joe Klimchak. Now, the race begins near where the tarp is rolled up on the third-base side, and the pierogi race around the warning track until the Clemente Wall in right-field. The race has lost many of the occasions of the Pirate Parrot influencing the ending; the races are generally won by normal means, although strange incidents do occur.

In 2008 and 2009, the pierogi appeared twice at Washington D.C.'s Nationals Park in the nightly Presidents Race. The first night in 2008, the four pierogi were chased by President Teddy, wielding a large aluminum foil fork and knife. The second night, the pierogi faced off with the presidents in a relay race. The relay race was repeated in 2009, with Potato Pete TKO-ing Teddy Roosevelt with a flying tackle, which was replayed repeatedly on sport shows. The Presidents appeared again at PNC Park during the Pirates series against the Nationals in April 2011, racing against the pierogi.

In 2010, the Pirates fired one of the pierogi racers after he made critical comments of the team on Facebook, a story that received national headlines. Andrew Kurtz, 24, of New Brighton, Pennsylvania, had criticized the team's decision to give then-manager John Russell and Pirates GM Neal Huntington contract extensions in the midst of a 12-game losing streak. The Pirates later rehired Kurtz after the team discovered that his boss in charge of the race didn't follow proper disciplinary action within the organization. Russell himself would be fired after the Bucs finished a Major League–worst 57–105 record for 2010.

=== 2014–present ===
==== Return of Potato Pete ====
During the race on July 23, 2014, where the Pirates were playing the Los Angeles Dodgers, Cheese Chester broke his foot while competing. Later on, during the game, the Pirates announced via their scoreboard that Cheese Chester was placed on the 15-day disabled list, and Potato Pete would return to take Chester's place for the time he'd miss due to the injury. The Pirates posted on their Twitter account a picture of Cheese Chester with crutches and confirmed it was indeed a broken foot, and he would miss six to eight weeks. It would be the first time that Potato Pete has competed in this event since the 2001 season; it would also mark the first appearance of Potato Pete at PNC Park since his encounter with Teddy Roosevelt in 2009 and his first appearance of any kind since 2012, when he confronted Teddy at Nationals Park.

During Potato Pete's return, he won 16 races in a row to tie the other pierogi, while Cheese Chester made a "rehab start" during the Panera Bread Great American Bagel Race during the August 28, 2014, game between the Altoona Curve (the Pirates' Double-A affiliate) and the Richmond Flying Squirrels, competing against the bagels Blueberry Bob, Asiago Allie, and Cinnamon Crunch Cindy. (Coincidentally, Pirates pitcher Charlie Morton was himself making a rehab start in the game.) It was considered the first "MLB Mascot Rehabilitation Assignment." Cheese Chester then spent the next two days confronting Potato Pete at PNC Park until the two agreed that whoever won a one-on-one race after the Pirates game against the Cincinnati Reds on August 30 would race with the rest of the pierogi the rest of the season, while the loser would be out for the season. Cheese Chester won his spot back after Potato Pete built a sizable lead but tripped after taunting Cheese Chester, allowing Cheese Chester to win the one-on-one race and return to the season-long competition.

For the 2015 season, all five pierogi started part of the Great Pierogi Race regularly, although on April 18, 2015, Potato Pete was "locked" inside a freezer as punishment after he cheated again.

==== Introduction of new pierogi ====
During the Pirates first homestand of the 2015 season, the team hinted over the course of several days on its official Instagram account that a new pierogi would be joining the Great Pierogi Race. After being interviewed by the Pirate Parrot and later ordered to race around PNC Park, the pierogi was introduced as Bacon Burt. In addition to his orange cap, Bacon Burt has a moustache. Bacon Burt would win in his debut race April 19, 2015, coincidentally while the Pirates were hosting the Brewers, taking Potato Pete's spot.

Along with introducing their annual new food offerings at the concessions at PNC Park, the team introduced its second female pierogi, Pizza Penny, on March 30, 2017.

==== Virtual pierogi races ====
During the 2020 season, played without fans in the stands due to the ongoing COVID-19 pandemic, the Pirates announced a virtual fan experience on July 25, 2020, that allowed fans to interact with staple in-game activities via social media and the MLB Ballpark app. During each home game, the team published a video of the race on the Ballpark app. All six pierogi from the previous season participated in the races, filmed at various locations near PNC Park, in rotating groups of four. The videos featured guest announcers from local radio and television stations, including WPXI, KDKA-FM, and KDKA-TV.

==== Roster details ====
The 2022 season ended with Sauerkraut Saul having zero wins.

As of 2023, the current Great Pierogi Race lineup consists of six contestants: Potato Pete, Jalapeño Hanna, Cheese Chester, Sauerkraut Saul, Oliver Onion, and Bacon Burt.

== See also ==
- Sausage Race
- Presidents Race
