= Cacti Park of the Palm Beaches =

Baseball park in West Palm Beach, Florida

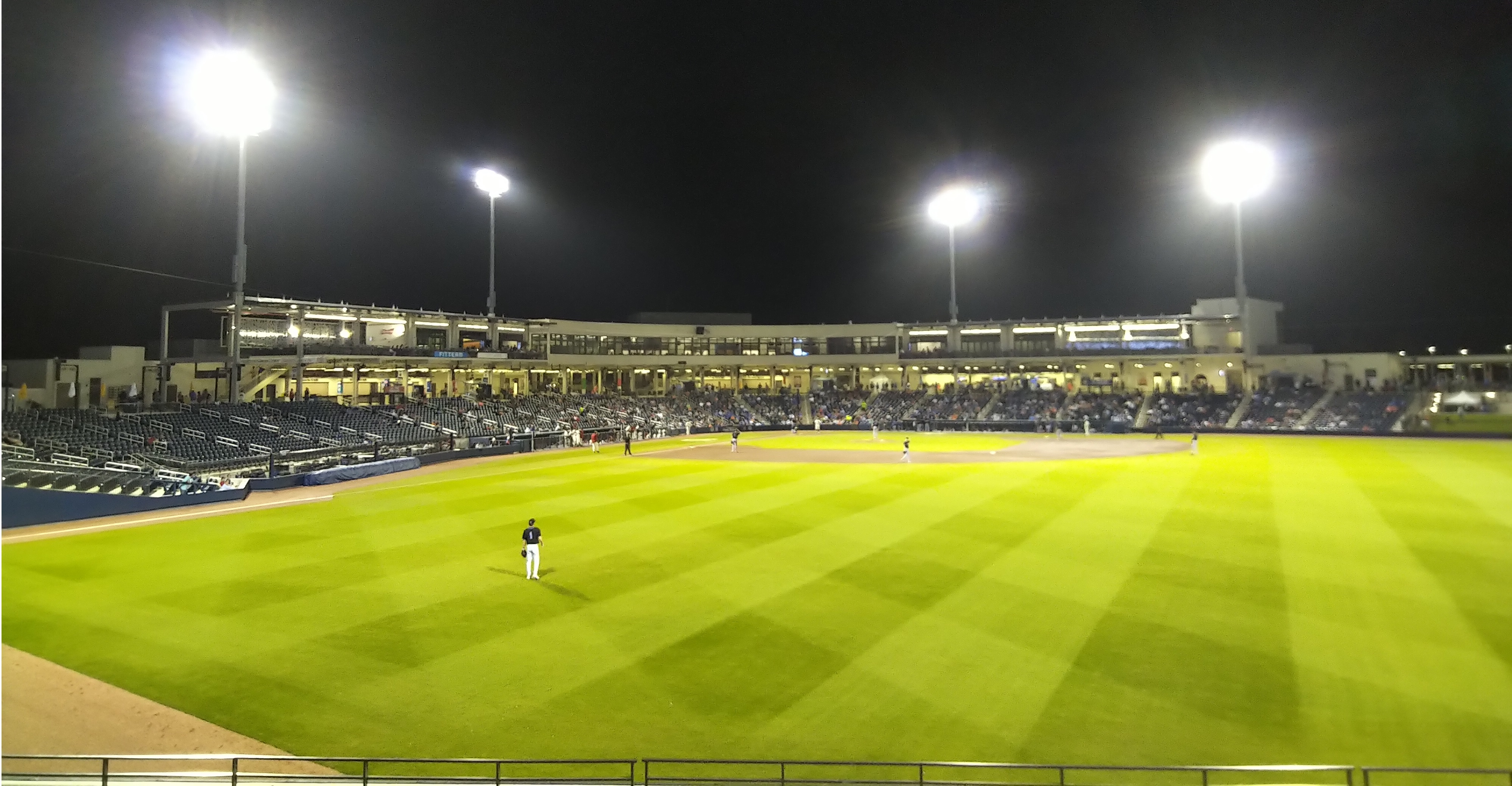

- The stadium's location in Florida Cacti Park (the United States)
- Interactive map of Cacti Park of the Palm Beaches
- Former names: The Ballpark of the Palm Beaches (2017, 2022–2023); FITTEAM Ballpark of the Palm Beaches (2018–2021)
- Address: 5444 Haverhill Road; West Palm Beach, Florida; United States
- Coordinates: 26°45′19″N 80°06′46″W
- Operator: Houston Astros, Washington Nationals
- Capacity: 6,500 (fixed seats); 7,858 (total)
- Surface: Grass
- Field size: Left Field: 329 ft (100 m); Left-Center Field: 389 ft (119 m); Center Field: 408 ft (124 m); Right-Center Field: 375 ft (114 m); Right Field: 330 ft (100 m)

Construction
- Groundbreaking: November 9, 2015
- Opened: February 28, 2017
- Cost: $148.6 Million
- Architect: HKS, Inc.
- Project manager: Marc Taylor Inc. (MTI)
- Structural engineers: Bliss & Nyitray, Inc.
- General contractor: Hunt Construction Group

Tenants
- FCL Astros (FCL) 2017–present FCL Nationals (FCL) 2017–present Houston Astros (MLB) (spring training) 2017–present Washington Nationals (MLB) (spring training) 2017–present

Website
- cactipark.com

CACTI Park of the Palm Beaches, formerly called The Ballpark of the Palm Beaches, is a baseball park located in West Palm Beach, Florida. The stadium has a capacity of 6,500 people in fixed seats with room for 1,000 more on the outfield berm. The stadium hosts the Houston Astros and Washington Nationals Major League Baseball teams annually for spring training. It also hosts the Florida Complex League Astros and the Florida Complex League Nationals of the Rookie-level Florida Complex League.

== Facilities ==
In addition to the stadium itself, the complex provides separate spring training facilities for the two teams. Each team has two major-league-size practice fields, four-minor-league-size practice fields, an agility field, a half field, batting cages, and pitching mounds. The Astros' training facilities are on the north and northeast side of the complex and their offices are behind the stadium's left-field corner, while the Nationals' facilities are on the south and southeast side with offices behind home plate.

In March 2020, the stadium became a coronavirus testing site for the City of West Palm Beach during the COVID-19 pandemic. It stopped offering testing in February 2021.

== Construction ==
A groundbreaking ceremony took place on November 9, 2015, and construction of the new facility was accelerated so that it could be completed in 16 months. Astros and Nationals pitchers and catchers officially reported for spring training at the new facility on February 14, 2017, followed by the rest of the players for both teams on February 17. Construction was not yet complete, but the teams were able to prioritize the parts of the facilities most important to spring training so that it met their needs by the reporting dates. As construction continued, both the Nationals and the Astros began their 2017 spring training schedules on February 25 with three straight road games before their first game at the new ballpark.

== Opening ==
With construction crews still putting the finishing touches on the stadium during the morning, the Nationals and Astros opened the Ballpark of the Palm Beaches with their first game there on February 28, 2017, with the Nationals playing as the home team. Commissioner of Baseball Rob Manfred cut a ceremonial ribbon, and a helicopter flyover took place during the opening ceremonies.

Before a crowd of 5,897, Nationals non-roster invitee Jeremy Guthrie threw the first pitch at 1:07 p.m. EST, to Astros first baseman Marwin González, who he eventually struck out. In the bottom of the first inning, Nationals second baseman Daniel Murphy doubled for the first hit in the ballpark's history, and a few minutes later scored its first run when Nationals right fielder Bryce Harper doubled to drive him home. In the top of the fourth inning, Astros designated hitter Carlos Beltrán hit the stadium's first home run, and catcher Derek Norris hit the first Nationals home run in the park's history in the bottom of the fourth. With two outs in the bottom of the ninth, outfielder Michael A. Taylor hit a walk-off solo home run to give the Nationals a 4–3 victory.

The first official regular season professional game at the complex was a Gulf Coast League game held on June 27, 2017, as the Gulf Coast League Astros hosted the Gulf Coast League Marlins. The Marlins won by a score of 14–9. The first official regular season professional game played inside the stadium itself was another Gulf Coast League game held on the evening of July 5, 2017, as the host Gulf Coast League Astros defeated their cross-complex rivals, the Gulf Coast League Nationals, by a score of 7–2.

== Naming rights ==
In 2024, rapper and businessman Travis Scott purchased the naming rights to the stadium, to promote his CACTI Hard Seltzer beverage. In 2018, a 12-year contract was agreed to by the Astros and Nationals with FITTEAM, a fitness beverage company located in Palm Beach Gardens.

== Culture and entertainment ==
Coincident with their 2017 move to The Ballpark of the Palm Beaches for spring training, the Washington Nationals announced that three former participants in the Presidents Race run during the regular season at Nationals Park in Washington, D.C. – Racing Presidents Calvin Coolidge ("Cal"), Herbert Hoover ("Herbie"), and William Howard Taft ("Bill") – had retired permanently to Florida, where they would compete against one another in races held during Nationals spring training games. The races take place during the fourth inning of Nationals games held at FITTEAM Ballpark of the Palm Beaches.
