= Boomer (mascot) =

Indiana Pacers' mascot

Boomer is the official mascot of the Indiana Pacers, a professional basketball team that plays in the National Basketball Association (NBA). He appears at each of the Pacers' home games, at special events for the NBA, as well as at other community & sporting events in central Indiana.

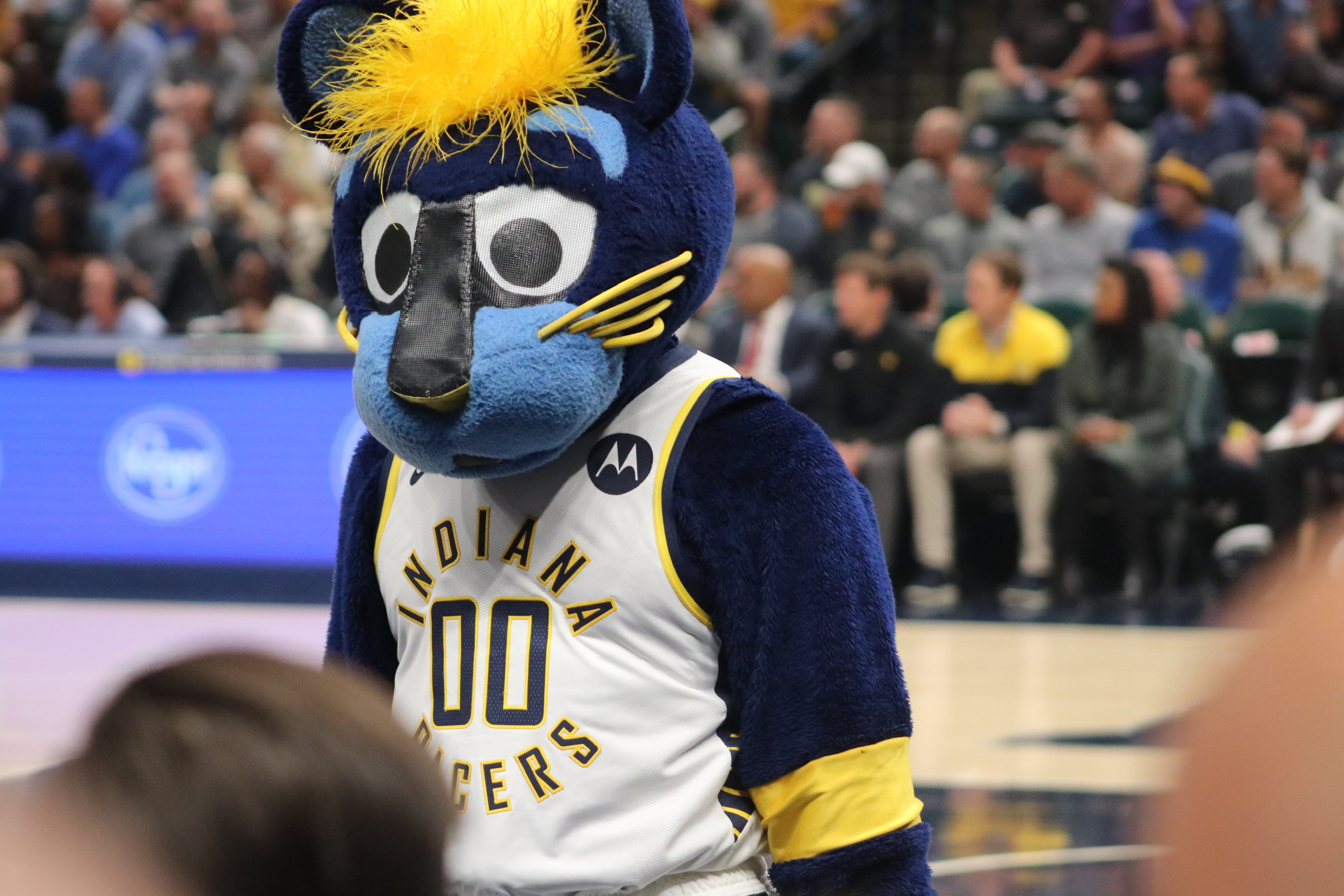
Boomer during the home season opener for the 2019–20 Indiana Pacers season.

Boomer was introduced before the start of the 1991 NBA season. Boomer is a 6 ft (1.8 m) tall energetic cat, sometimes called the "Pacers panther", who performs high flying dunks and dance moves in addition to firing up the crowd attending games. He wears a #00 Pacers jersey and is one of the more accomplished NBA mascots, being selected for several NBA All-Star Games including 2024 in Indianapolis.

In 2020, Boomer was selected to the Mascot Hall of Fame; the museum and children's center, based in Whiting, Indiana, was founded by David Raymond, who was the original Phillie Phanatic. He was inducted alongside mascot Blue from the Indianapolis Colts.

Bowser was a former mascot, in canine form, who worked in tandem with Boomer. The duo was broken up when Bowser was retired during the 2009–2010 season, after 8 years in the business.

Mini-Boomer is a smaller, more youthful version of Boomer, presumably his "offspring", that performs with him at select games.

Pacers Power Pack are a group of young men and women who perform trampoline-assisted slam dunks with Boomer during the break before the fourth quarter of home games, as well as assisting him in firing up the crowd throughout the contests.
