= Mr. Met =

Mascot of the New York Mets

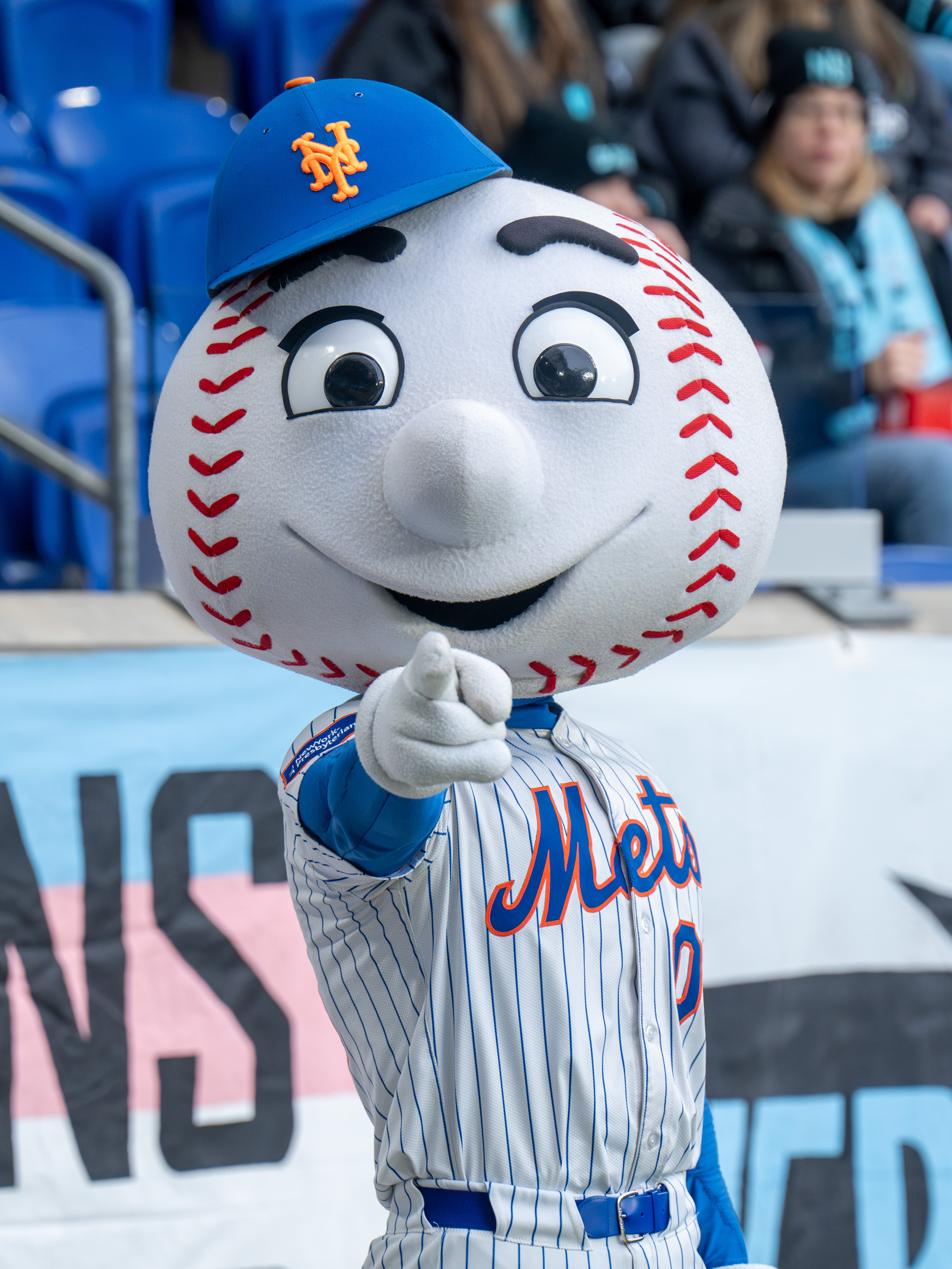
- Mr. Met in 2026
- Team: New York Mets
- Description: Man with a baseball for a head
- First seen: 1963
- Related mascot(s): Mrs. Met
- Website: www.mlb.com/mets/fans/the-story-of-mr-met

Mr. Met is the official mascot for Major League Baseball's New York Mets. Mr. Met first appeared in 1963 as a cartoon drawing in programs. When the team moved to Shea Stadium the following year, he came to life in the form of a costumed mascot—he is believed to be the first Major League Baseball mascot to appear in human form.

Mr. Met is a man with a large baseball for a head. He can be seen at Citi Field during Mets home games, has appeared in several commercials as part of ESPN's This is SportsCenter campaign, and has been elected into the Mascot Hall of Fame. In 2012, Forbes Magazine listed Mr. Met as the number one mascot in all of sports.

== History ==
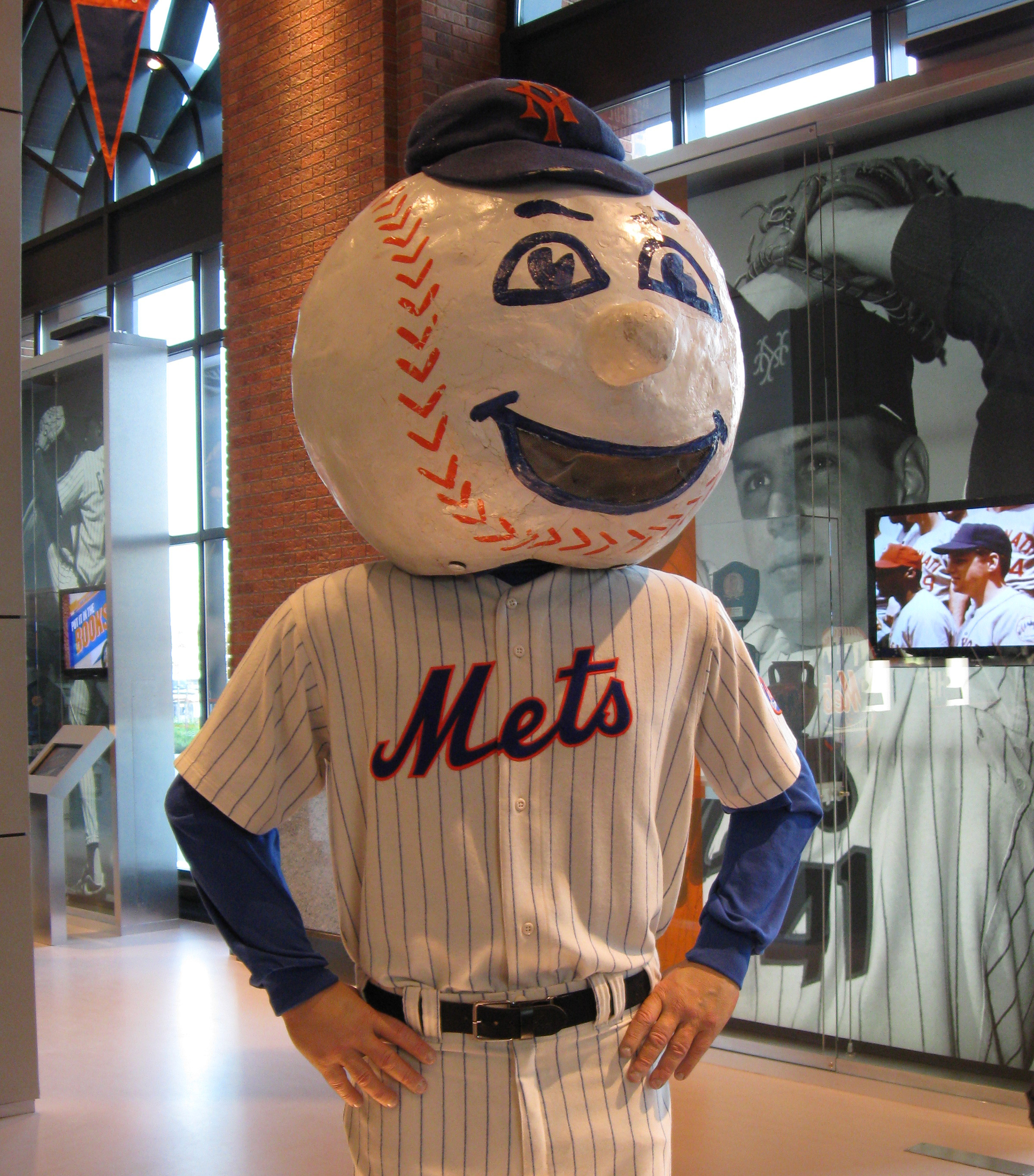
The second version of the Mr. Met head, as seen on display at the Mets Hall of Fame and Museum at Citi Field.

Mr. Met was first introduced on the cover of game programs, yearbooks, and on scorecards in 1963, when the Mets were still playing at the Polo Grounds in northern Manhattan. Comic book artist Al Avison was at least one of the artists who contributed to the character's design. When the Mets moved to Shea Stadium in 1964, fans were introduced to a live costumed version, portrayed by team ticket office employee, Daniel J. Reilly. Mr. Met is believed to have been the first mascot in Major League Baseball to exist in live-action (as opposed to artistically rendered) form. He was also the first person on the Mets to be represented by a bobblehead doll.

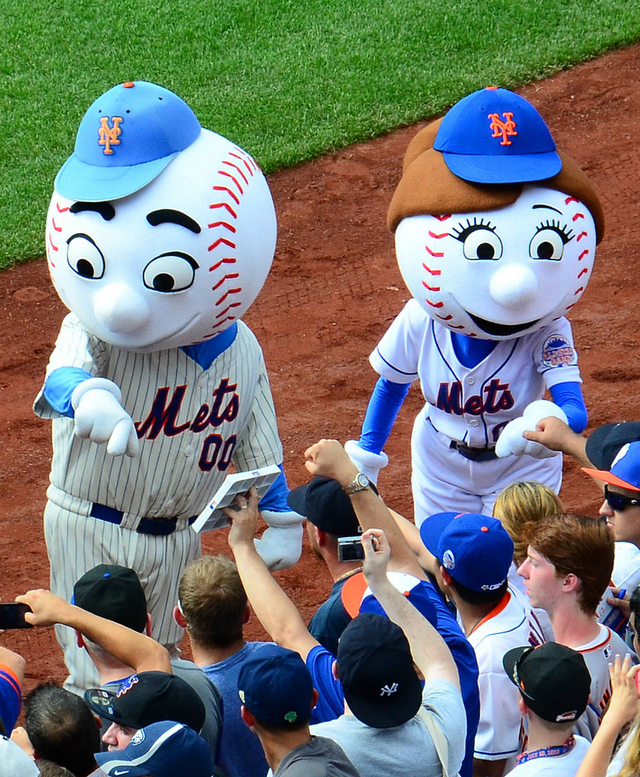
Mr. Met with Mrs. Met in 2013

In the 1960s, Mr. Met occasionally appeared in print with a female companion, Mrs. Met (originally called "Lady Met"), and less frequently with a group of three "little Mets" children; the smallest was a baby in Lady Met's arms. Mrs. Met was debuted in a short lived live costumed form in 1975 before being reintroduced in 2013.

In the mid-1970s, the Mets franchise began to abandon the Mr. Met mascot. In 1976, he appeared on the cover of the New York Mets Official Yearbook. In 1977 and 1978, Mr. Met and Lady Met appeared on the cover of the Mets Shea Stadium Official Schedule. After that time, he was not utilized in their advertising and he remained absent for almost 20 years. He was phased out prior to the upsurge in mascot popularity caused by The Famous Chicken and the Phillie Phanatic in the late '70s. In 1979, after the Mets discontinued use of Mr. Met, the team briefly experimented with a new mascot named "Mettle the mule" that was a living animal that would parade along the foul lines prior to a game.

In 1992, long time Mets fan Lois Kaufmann, of Queens, New York, wrote a compelling appeal for his reinstatement and asking the Mets to resurrect the mascot. The team did not act quickly or grant Lois her request to be Mr. Met. However, in 1994, they did follow her advice and revived Mr. Met as part of a promotion with Nickelodeon. After a long absence, Mr. Met was quickly re-embraced by New York Mets fans and has since remained a constant part of the franchise.

Mr. Met is prominently featured in signage all over Citi Field. He was also heavily used in Shea Stadium signage, as seen in this photo.

On April 14, 2002, the Mets held a birthday party for Mr. Met at Shea Stadium. It was attended by costumed mascots from all around Major League Baseball and by Sandy the Seagull, mascot of the Brooklyn Cyclones, a Mets farm team.

In the 2003 season, first baseman Tony Clark was the first Mets player ever to wear #00, Mr. Met's number. In June of that season, he switched to #52 when Queens schoolchildren asked him what had happened to Mr. Met.

Mr. Met was elected into the Mascot Hall of Fame in the class of 2007. When Mrs. Met became the first female mascot elected to the hall, in the class of 2026, this made the Mets the first team to have two mascots in the hall.

Beginning on August 14, 2009, throughout their series against the San Francisco Giants, the Mets wore throwback jerseys featuring a Mr. Met patch on the right sleeve.

Currently, Mr. Met can be seen at Citi Field during and after games. He is usually found near Mr. Met's Kiddie Field where fans can meet and pose for pictures with him. He can be hired for special events and private parties. Mr. Met is also featured on Mets Money, which are $1, $5 and $10 denomination gift certificates accepted at concession stands and souvenir shops at Citi Field. The design is somewhat reminiscent of standard U.S. currency, but instead features images of Mr. Met attired and posed similarly to the historical official (Washington, Lincoln or Hamilton) featured on the respective bill.

The second version of the Mr. Met head is now on display at the New York Mets Hall of Fame and Museum at Citi Field.

In 2013, the Mets introduced batting practice caps featuring Mr. Met on the front. In 2014, a Mr. Met sleeve patch was featured on the Mets' blue alternate home and road jerseys. In 2015, a far more detailed Mr. Met backstory was written by a longtime fan in cooperation with the team and published by Mascot Books.

== Performers ==
Mr. Met has been portrayed by many people over the years. Dan Reilly was the first person to wear the Mr. Met costume, starting in 1964. In 2007, Reilly wrote a book about his experiences with the team, called The Original Mr. Met Remembers.

Mr. Met was portrayed from 1994 through 1997 by AJ Mass, currently a fantasy sports writer for ESPN. Mass has written several books and articles on his experiences portraying Mr. Met.

Matt Golden portrayed Mr. Met from 1999 to 2011.

On May 31, 2017, Mr. Met was heading back to the clubhouse after a Mets loss when he engaged in a heated exchange with an opposing fan. The argument ended with Mr. Met giving the finger towards the fan, which was caught on video. The Mets then changed performers for Mr. Met.

== In popular culture ==
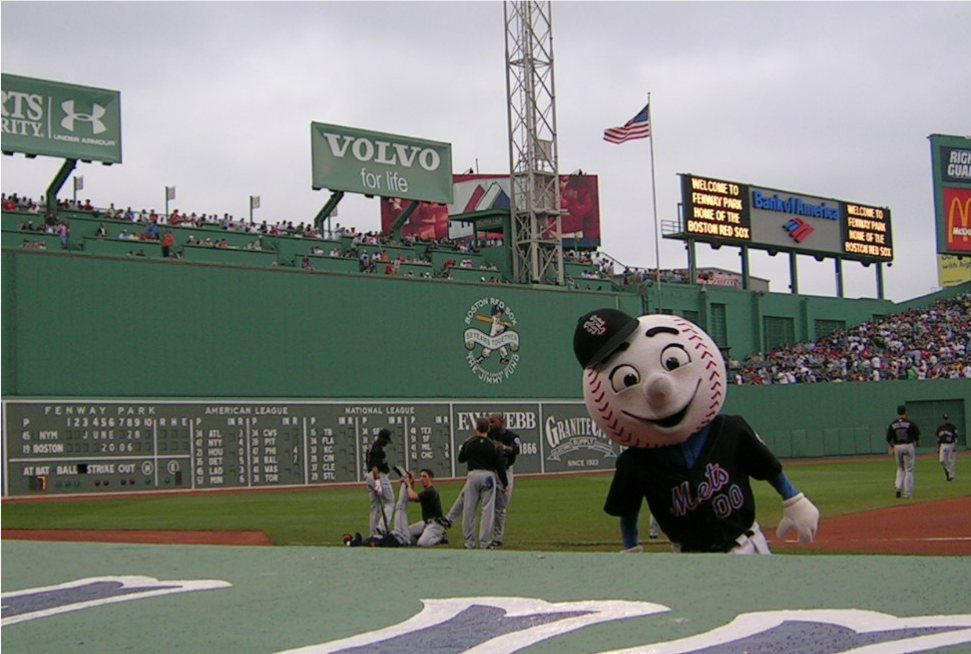
Mr. Met at Fenway Park

In a 2003 This is SportsCenter ad, when the show ends, everyone rushes out of the studio, creating a massive traffic jam. It then shows Mr. Met and Lady Met driving home on the freeway (with the Met children in the back), with Lady Met subtitled as saying they were glad to get out early. The New York Mets theme song, "Meet the Mets", is on their car radio. (A shorter version with just the Mets family has Mrs. Met accusing Mr. Met of making eyes at one of the female ESPN sportscasters.)

In 2009, Mr. Met appeared in another This is SportsCenter ad, which Mr. Met is talking with Stuart Scott at a microwave. When Josh Hamilton shows up to use the microwave, Mr. Met angrily gestures at him and walks away. Hamilton is confused until Scott reveals that some of the balls Hamilton hit in the 2008 Home Run Derby were actually relatives of the mascot.

In 2007, Mr. Met became a spokesman for MTA New York City Transit, appearing on several advertisements and safety messages within the New York City Subways and buses.

He was also featured in commercials for MLB 06: The Show, a video game for Sony's PlayStation 2, where a camera crew followed him around as he performed his daily duties, such as buying coffee and picking up his laundry. In 2010, he began appearing in commercials for Citibank that aired during Mets broadcasts, inducing Mets fans to join him in a "Let's Go Mets" cheer during mundane activities such as business meetings.

He has his own Build-A-Bear Workshop store, but instead of at Citi Field, it's located at the Mets' flagship store on Manhattan's Fifth Avenue.

Mr. Met was featured on the remake of The Odd Couple. In it Oscar Madison was to throw out the first pitch. His estranged father (Garry Marshall) is with him and the senior Madison gets Oscar so mad that he hits Mr. Met in the head. The Mets get Oscar to, as a publicity stunt, apologize to Mr. Met.

In 2019, Mr. Met appeared in an episode of Madam Secretary. Newly elected President Elizabeth McCord, anxious about throwing a ceremonial pitch at a Mets game, dreams she knocks out Mr. Met instead.

Mr. Met and the Phillie Phanatic did a MasterCard commercial in 2013 to raise money for ending cancer. According to his 2019 Topps Opening Day Baseball Card, the "hustling humanoid [still] loves getting selfies taken with fans and raising money for charitable causes."

In 2026, Mr. Met appeared alongside Spider-Man and Juan Soto in a commercial to promote the film Spider-Man: Brand New Day.

== See also ==
- List of Major League Baseball mascots
