= David Raymond =

American sports personality

- Born: February 7, 1956 (age 70)
- Education: University of Delaware
- Occupation: Mascot
- Years active: 1978–1993
- Known for: Phillie Phanatic; Mascot Hall of Fame
- Website: daveraymondspeaks.com

David Raymond (born 1955 or 1956 (age 70–71)) is an American sports personality best known as the original portrayer of the Phillie Phanatic. He is considered to have revolutionized the mascot industry and was the Phanatic from 1978 to 1993. Afterwards, he started a mascot business and founded the Mascot Hall of Fame.

== Early life ==
Raymond is the son of legendary University of Delaware football coach Tubby Raymond. He attended Newark High School where he played football as an end and his team's kicking specialist; in 1973, he was named first-team All-Blue Hen Conference as a specialist while making 2 of 3 field goals and 10 of 13 extra points, and averaging 34 yards per punt. He participated in the Delaware Blue-Gold All-Star Game. Raymond then attended the University of Delaware and played for the Fightin' Blue Hens football team under his father, being the starting punter from 1976 to 1977.

== Career ==
Raymond as the Phillie Phantic in 1987

Raymond's father was friends with Ruly Carpenter, the owner of the Philadelphia Phillies of Major League Baseball (MLB), and was able to get Raymond an internship with the team in 1976, working in the promotions department. He was described as "'sort of a gofer' in the Phillies front office, helping with promotions and selling tickets, getting noticed as an affably goofy guy." He returned to the team in 1977.

In 1978, he received a call "out of the blue" from the Phillies and "thought he was going to be fired." Rather, he was offered the opportunity to portray the team's new mascot, the Phillie Phanatic, a large, green, flightless bird. He said "They tapped me because they knew I couldn't say no. 'Hey, stay for the games – we'll pay ya.' 'OK.' And that was it ... They charged me to dress up like a 300-pound green, furry muppet and entertain the same Philadelphia fans who booed Santa Claus and the Easter Bunny! What was I thinking?"

Raymond first portrayed the Phanatic in April 1978. ESPN noted: "His job description: hex pitchers, taunt managers, pop wheelies on an ATV, devour foul balls in his prominent proboscis and dance like the fictional, lunatic Galapagos Island bird he was portraying." He ultimately served as the Phanatic for 16 years and helped it become one of the most popular and well-known mascots in sports; Raymond is considered to have revolutionized the mascot industry, with The New York Times stating that he "practically invented the modern sports mascot". As the Phanatic, Raymond was recognized by several publications as the "Best Mascot in Sports" and the "Best Mascot Ever". He stayed with the team as they made three appearances in the World Series, retiring after the 1993 season.

After his tenure as the Phillie Phanatic, Raymond started his own business designing mascots, the Raymond Entertainment Group. He helped design over 130 different mascots, including Gritty of the Philadelphia Flyers. He founded the Mascot Hall of Fame, a museum in Whiting, Indiana, dedicated to the best sports mascots, and created the "Mascot Boot Camp", an event for developing mascots.

Raymond now works as a consultant and is a "sought-after speaker on how to bring fun into the workplace". He was inducted into the Delaware Sports Museum and Hall of Fame in 2024.
