= Youppi! =

Canadian sports mascot

Youppi
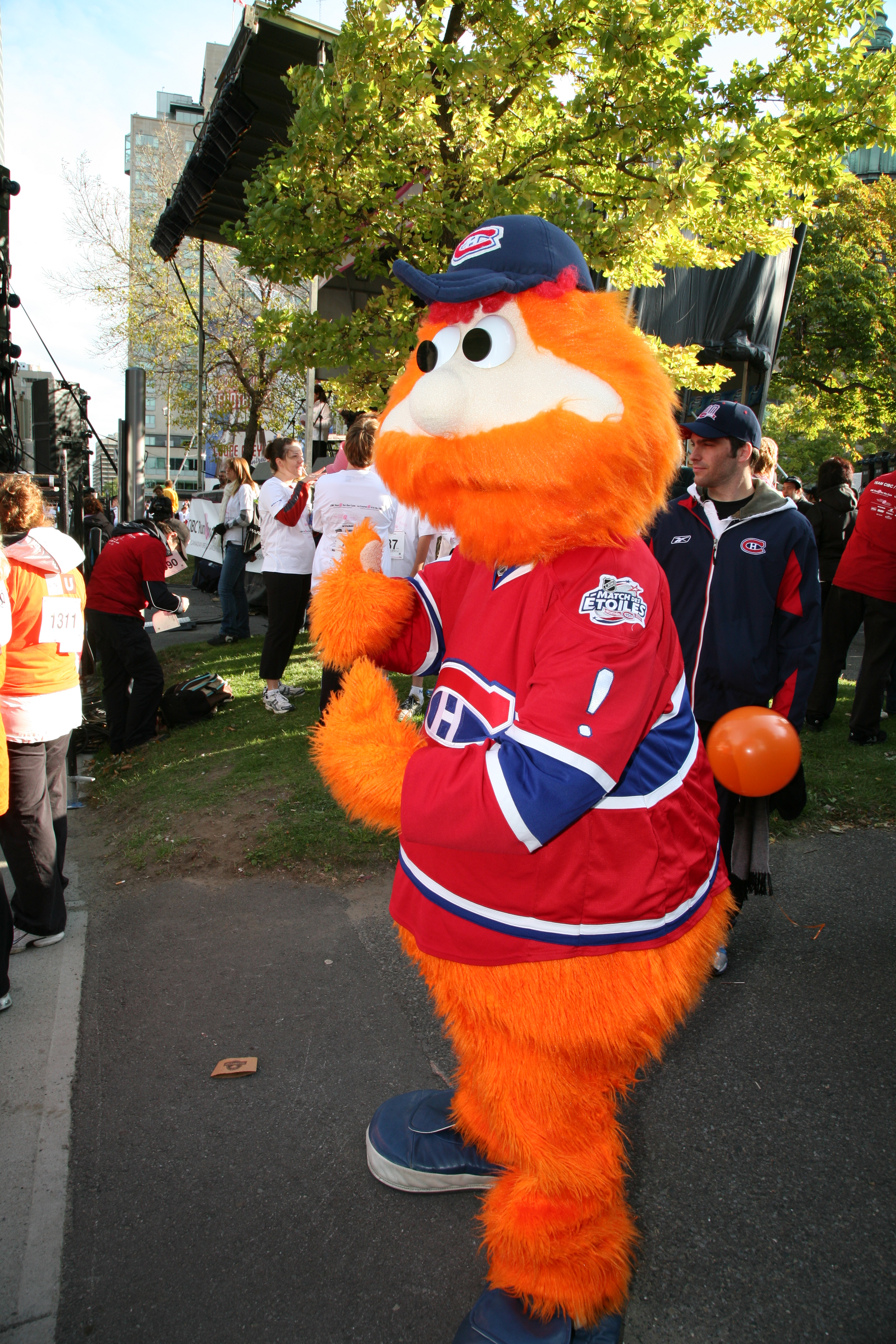
- Youppi as the Canadiens' mascot
- Team: Montreal Canadiens (formerly Montreal Expos)
- Description: Furry orange creature
- Origin of name: French word for "Yippee!"
- First seen: 1979 (Expos); 2005 (Canadiens)
- Last seen: 2004 (Expos)
- Related mascot(s): Souki
- Hall of Fame: voted December 2019 inducted June 2020

Youppi (sometimes branded as Youppi!) (French pronunciation: [jupi] or French pronunciation: [jʊp.pi], French for Yippee!) is the official mascot for the Montreal Canadiens, and former longtime mascot of the Montreal Expos. Youppi's jersey has an "!" instead of a number.

== History ==
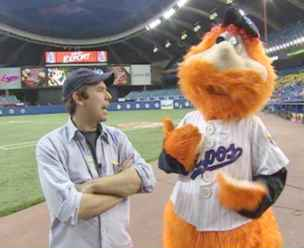
Youppi as the Expos' mascot

Youppi, a creation of Acme Mascots, Inc. (a division of Harrison/Erickson, Inc.), was commissioned by Montreal Expos vice-president Roger D. Landry. Originally leased by the baseball team in 1979, the mascot was eventually purchased by the Expos and represented them until they moved to Washington, D.C. after the 2004 season. With instructions from Landry and Rodger Brulotte, Youppi was designed by Bonnie Erickson, formerly a designer for Jim Henson, and the designer of Miss Piggy, Statler and Waldorf and other Muppet characters. Youppi's orange color was chosen as a reference to Rusty Staub, a former player for the Expos. The orange, hairy giant was a popular figure at the Olympic Stadium prior to the Expos' relocation to Washington, D.C.

=== Notoriety ===
Youppi was the first mascot to be thrown out of a Major League Baseball game. During the 1989 Expos season, on August 23 while atop the visitors' dugout in the 11th inning, Youppi took a running leap, landing hard and noisily on its roof, and then snuck into a front row seat. Los Angeles Dodgers manager Tommy Lasorda complained to the umpires and Youppi was ejected by Bob Davidson, though he later returned, confined to the home team's dugout roof, as Montreal eventually lost 1–0 in 22 innings. Youppi was also a frequent joke punchline of notoriously sarcastic Atlanta Braves broadcaster Skip Caray. Pitcher Bill Lee referenced Youppi during interviews in Ken Burns's Baseball documentary.

Youppi is one of only three mascots featured as displays at the Baseball Hall of Fame. The others are the Phillie Phanatic of Philadelphia, another design by Erickson, and the Famous Chicken from San Diego.

The Montreal-based political cartoonist Terry Mosher, better known as "Aislin", depicted or referenced Youppi on several occasions, including a prescient 1988 cartoon drawn at a time when the Expos were having a poor season. It depicted then-general manager of the Canadiens Serge Savard receiving a phone call from Youppi, presumably seeking employment.

Youppi was voted to the Mascot Hall of Fame in December 2019, and was inducted in June 2020. Youppi is the first, and to date only, mascot of a Canadian team to receive the honor.

=== From baseball to hockey ===
After the Expos moved to Washington, D.C., and became the Washington Nationals, the Nationals initially stated that Youppi would still be a part of the team in some capacity. However, the team adopted a new mascot, the eagle "Screech". For months after the move, the fate of Youppi hung in the balance. Negotiations were held with ten groups, including the Montreal Alouettes.

On September 16, 2005, the Montreal Canadiens announced that Youppi would become the first official mascot of the organization, and the first mascot to ever switch between any two major sports leagues in North America. Prior to Youppi, the Canadiens had no mascot. The terms of acquisition were reportedly in the six figures. Youppi now sports the Canadiens' bleu-blanc-rouge (blue, white and red) jersey. Youppi's first game in the Bell Centre was on October 18, 2005.

On February 19, 2012, at the Canadiens' first home game after the death of Montreal Expos great Gary Carter, Youppi wore the Expos colours in Carter's memory.

On May 16, 2014, on the eve of the Canadiens series against the New York Rangers in the 2014 Eastern Conference Finals, New York City native Jimmy Fallon, the host of NBC's Tonight Show, which is taped in New York, made a bet with the Montreal Canadiens that if they won the series, Fallon would wear a Montreal jersey during his opening monologue. However, if the Rangers won the series, Youppi would have to wear a Rangers jersey around Montreal and post at least ten pictures of him doing so on the Canadiens' Twitter account and also change their avatar to a pic of Rangers goalie Henrik Lundqvist playing guitar. The Rangers won the series on May 29 in six games. As such, on June 1, the Canadiens honoured their bet and a dejected Youppi was photographed around Montreal in a Rangers jersey with Fallon's name on the back, and the last photo, as Fallon stated, featured him riding the mechanical bull at Montreal bar Chez Serge.

=== METAL! ===
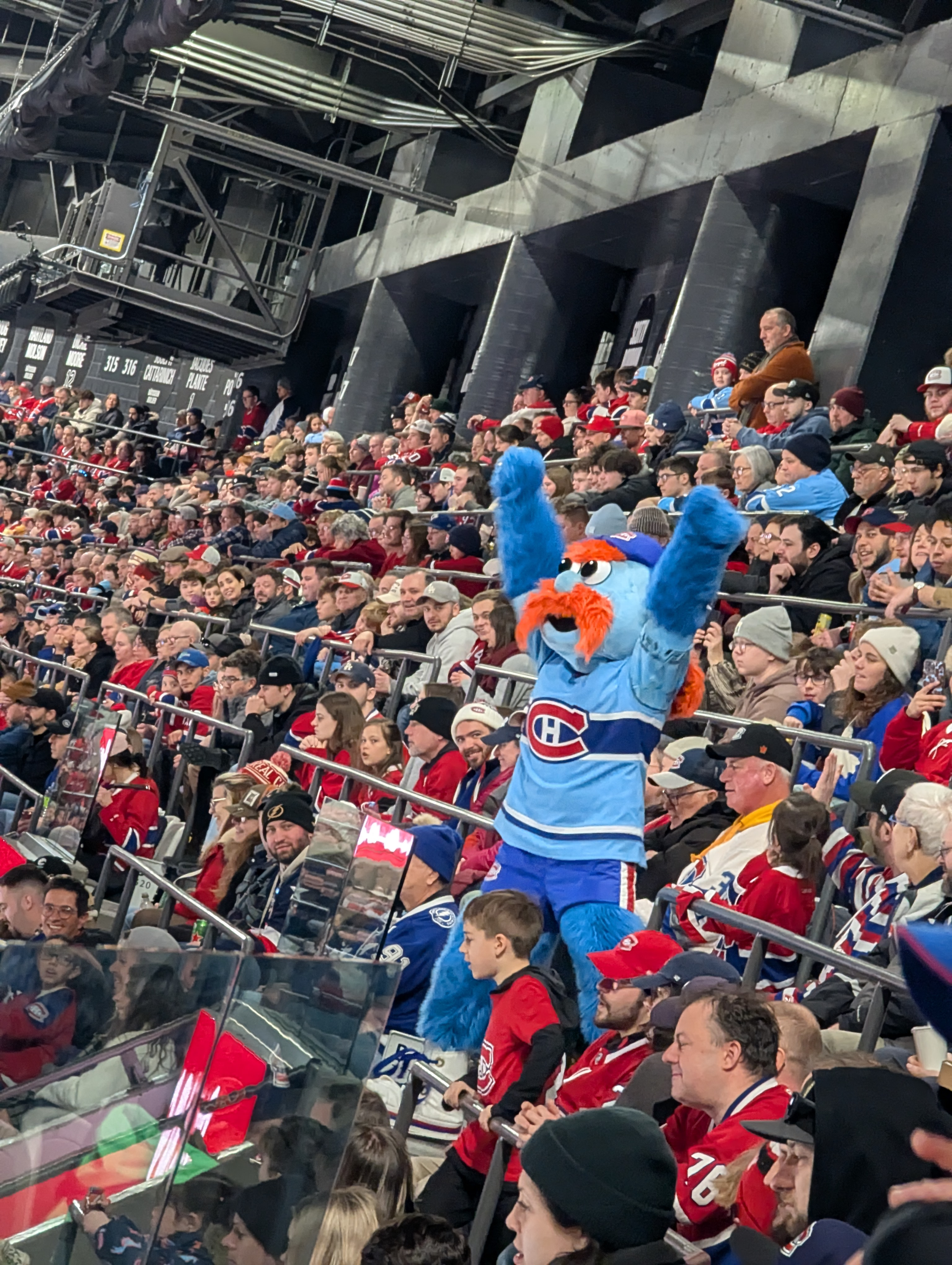
Metal in the stands at a game.

In 2022, to promote the team's reverse retro jerseys, the team created METAL!, a heavy metal-obsessed blue creature, who claims to have been Youppi's "twin brother" and the Canadiens mascot from 1979 to 1993, even though there is no evidence of the latter statement. According to the Habs' announcement, METAL! is claimed to have fallen asleep in an ice machine in the Montreal Forum basement after a party celebrating the Stanley Cup win in 1993, and only emerged in the summer of 2022, when the machine was unearthed during renovations. He wears "¡" on his jersey (a "reverse" of Youppi's "!" number).

METAL! was announced to be "retired" ahead of the 2024–25 NHL season, following the conclusion of the NHL's "reverse retro" jersey program. He still occasionally appears at some Canadiens events.

== Youppi portrayers ==
In the 26 seasons that Youppi was working with the Expos, only 5 men portrayed the mascot: Denis Desaulniers, Jean-Claude Tremblay, Claude Hubert, Jean-Simon Bibeau and Sylvain Ouellette.

=== Denis Desaulniers (1979–1983) ===
Denis Desaulniers was the first to wear the costume following the shift from Souki to Youppi. Inspired by the popularity and irreverence of the San Diego Chicken, Desaulniers auditioned for and received the part at 25 years old. During his career as Youppi, Desaulniers strived to create a warm soul and fun-loving attitude for the character.

Desaulniers also introduced one of Youppi's most iconic moves: punching himself in the nose. He claims this was to stay in character while adjusting the head of the costume so he could see. Underneath the head of the mascot, he wore a motorcycle helmet with a thick layer of styrofoam to protect his head, which would cause the mascot's head to fall forward frequently.

=== Jean-Claude Tremblay (1983–1985) ===
Jean-Claude Tremblay had his first interaction with the Expos after being hired to fix the mascot's costume. At the time, Tremblay was doing corporate mascot gigs to make ends meet while working full-time at his brother's art shop. Once the Expos' team discovered Tremblay's talents as a mascot, he was offered the opportunity to succeed Desaulniers.

Tremblay was responsible for many changes to Youppi's costume, including more securely-attached eyes and a swap from the scruffy old material to washable parts following complaints (including his own) of the mascot's smell.

After 3 seasons, Tremblay quit his role as Youppi to focus on his real passion: creating mascots. He is credited with creating mascots such as the Tampa Bay Rays' Raymond and the Indianapolis Colts' Blue.

=== Claude Hubert (1985–1991) ===
Claude Hubert was involved with mascots for around 20 years; he worked for many Canadian sports teams, such as the Montreal Dragons and the Montreal Machine.

As Youppi, Hubert was responsible for the first and only incident wherein a mascot was expelled from a Major League Baseball game. As Youppi, Hubert hopped on top of the away team's dugout during an Expos v. Dodgers game and, following continued antics, was confronted by Tommy Lasorda. (Hubert claims to have already known of Lasorda's distaste for mascots following his infamous "tussle" with the Phillie Phanatic.) After the scuffle began to escalate, Bob Davidson, the umpire during that game, made the decision to eject Youppi, who was eventually readmitted following chants from the crowd and a promise to remain on the Expos' side of the field.

=== Jean-Simon Bibeau (1988–1990, 2003–present) ===
This was not Bibeau's first experience with athletic recognition, as he was already holding a USA NCAA record for goals scored in a season while playing hockey with the Plattsburg Cardinals at this time.

By 1995, Bibeau directed all of Youppi's activities for the Expos, and would continue following Youppi's transition from baseball with the Expos to hockey with the Montreal Canadiens to the present day. Bibeau shared the full responsibilities of Youppi with Hubert.

=== Sylvain Ouellette (1996–2003) ===
The last to portray Youppi during his time as a baseball mascot, Sylvain Ouellette was previously working as an entertainer at nightclubs. While working in nightclubs, he met Vincent Guy Aubry, a DJ who often worked at the Olympic Stadium during Expos games. After hearing the Expos were looking for a mascot, Aubry mentioned Ouellette to his superior at the stadium. Although Ouellette was not a baseball fan at the time, his love and passion for entertaining landed him the job.

During the Expos' two seasons in Puerto Rico, Ouellette proved especially valuable due to his Spanish proficiency and experience with Latin dancing and culture.

== See also ==
- List of National Hockey League mascots
- List of Major League Baseball mascots
