= Gritty =

Mascot for the Philadelphia Flyers

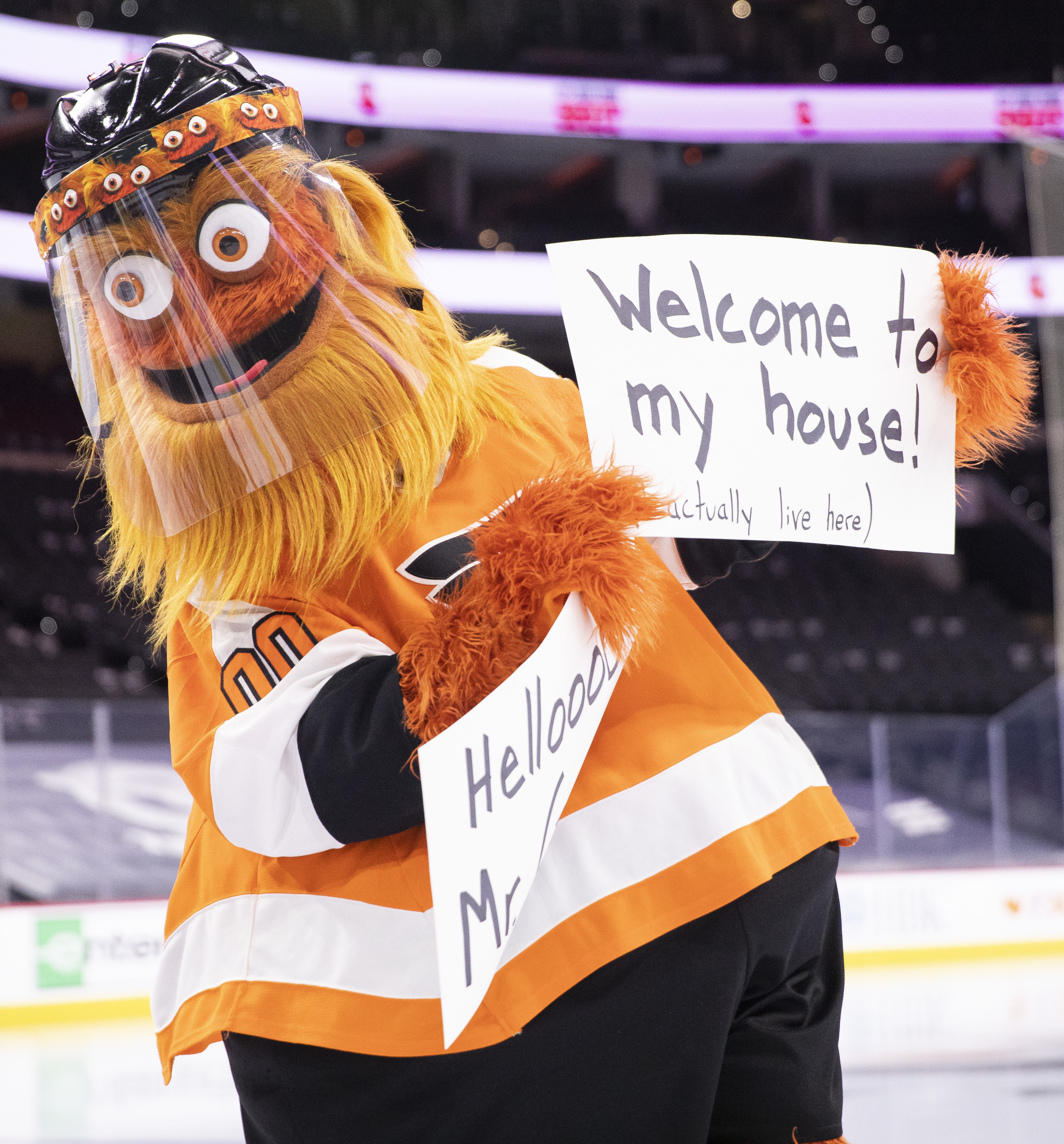
- Gritty in 2021
- Team: Philadelphia Flyers
- Description: Large furry orange creature in Flyers regalia
- First seen: September 24, 2018
- Related mascot(s): Phillie Phanatic, Youppi!
- Website: NHL.com/flyers/fans/gritty

Gritty is the official mascot for the Philadelphia Flyers of the National Hockey League (NHL). He is a 7-foot-tall (2.1 m) furry orange creature with googly eyes who wears Flyers gear. Gritty has been compared to the Phillie Phanatic, the mascot for the Philadelphia Phillies baseball team. He was created by Brian Allen of Flyland Designs with help from David Raymond, the first man to portray the Phillie Phanatic.

Gritty was introduced on September 24, 2018. According to his official biography, Gritty emerged after construction at the Xfinity Mobile Arena, the Flyers' home arena, disturbed his secret hideout. Within the months following his debut, Gritty became an Internet sensation and made appearances on several talk shows.

== Creation ==
Prior to the 2018–19 NHL season, the only two National Hockey League teams without an official mascot were the Philadelphia Flyers and the New York Rangers. The Flyers' first mascot, Slapshot, lasted only for the 1976–77 season.

The impetus behind Gritty's creation started when the Flyers' marketing department attended the mascot events at the 2016 NHL All-Star Game in Nashville, Tennessee, and realized that they were missing out on all the marketing and community outreach programs that the league's mascots were generating for their respective teams. The Flyers then commissioned Brian Allen of Flyland Designs in Bellefonte, Pennsylvania, to design Gritty in August 2018. David Raymond, who portrayed the Phillie Phanatic, consulted on Gritty's creation. The Flyers organization wanted Gritty to have a rather intimidating appearance, as "someone you'd high-five but not hug", according to Allen.

== History ==
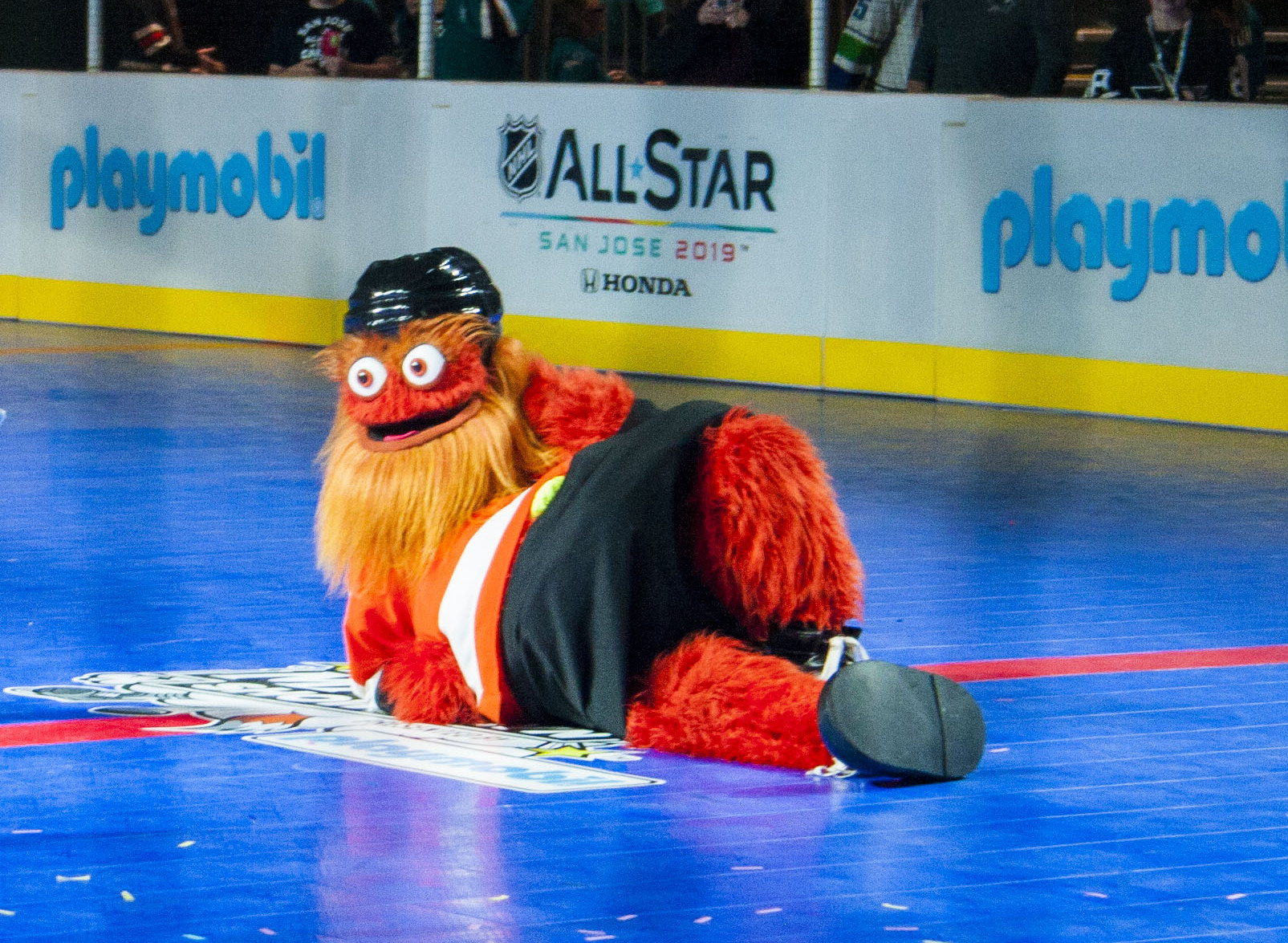
Gritty at the 2019 NHL All-Star Game

Gritty was introduced on September 24, 2018, and appeared on The Tonight Show Starring Jimmy Fallon several days later. Gritty was active on social media from his debut: his odd appearance and stunts on Twitter, such as seeming to threaten the mascot of the Pittsburgh Penguins and recreating Kim Kardashian's "Break the Internet" photograph, contributed to his rise in infamy. Within days, Gritty's Twitter account had more followers than any other NHL mascot. In his first on-ice appearance, Gritty fell while firing T-shirts into the crowd from a T-shirt cannon. In his second appearance on ice, Gritty body-checked contestants in a goalie race during an intermission and shot a Flyers staff member with a T-shirt cannon.

On October 13, 2019, the first ever "Gritty anti-runners 5K" took place. This 5K race included Gritty's favorite things along the track, including hot dogs, silly string, and a shrine to Claude Giroux.

In November 2019, during a fan meet-and-greet between Gritty and Flyers season ticket holders, a fan reported that the Flyers employee portraying Gritty punched their 13-year-old son in the back. After an internal investigation by the Flyers led to no other witnesses of such abuse, the fan reported the incident to the Philadelphia Police Department, which led its own investigation. On February 3, 2020, the Flyers employee portraying Gritty was officially cleared of any wrongdoing and charges were not filed.

Gritty introduced the Philadelphia Fusion, an Overwatch esports team, during its 2019 and 2020 home-stand matches.

In May 2020, due to the COVID-19 pandemic in Pennsylvania, Gritty began wearing a face shield. In September, the Philadelphia Department of Public Health released a promotional video featuring Gritty to encourage wearing face masks in public, and in December the department and the NHL cleared Gritty to resume public appearances at Flyers games.

Gritty and Sir Patrick Stewart appeared in the opening skit of a special post-Super-Bowl episode of The Late Show With Stephen Colbert, on February 3, 2019 where he is called "Gritwald" more than once, implying that "Gritty" is just a nickname. Gritty appeared in the Family Guy episode "Cootie & The Blowhard", which aired on November 7, 2021 on Fox. Gritty appeared in ABC's Philadelphia-set sitcom Abbott Elementary in the season two premiere, "Development Day", which premiered on September 21, 2022. Gritty made a professional wrestling appearance at WWE's Extreme Rules event held on October 8, 2022, getting beaten by The Miz backstage who was looking for Dexter Lumis. Eventually, after Lumis put Miz to sleep, Gritty attacked him and left. Gritty appeared in season sixteen of FX's Philadelphia-set sitcom It's Always Sunny in Philadelphia in episode five, "Celebrity Booze: The Ultimate Cash Grab". The episode premiered on June 28, 2023. Gritty appeared in the Albie's Elevator episode: "Big Orange Fuzzy Thing". Gritty appeared on the Philadelphia-set finale of the thirty-sixth season of the CBS reality competition show The Amazing Race, which aired on May 15, 2024.

=== Filmography ===
Year	Title	Notes
2019	The Late Show With Stephen Colbert	Episode: "Sunday, February 3rd, 2019, post-Super Bowl LIII"
2021	Family Guy	Episode: "Cootie & The Blowhard"
2022	Abbott Elementary	Episode: "Development Day"
2023	Albie's Elevator	Episode: "Big Orange Fuzzy Thing"
2023	It's Always Sunny in Philadelphia	Episode: "Celebrity Booze: The Ultimate Cash Grab"
2024	The Amazing Race	Episode: "The Longest Minute of Your Life"

== Reception ==
Observers brought attention to his appearance, which could be construed as frightening, while The Guardian described him as an "acid trip of a mascot." Response to Gritty's introduction was immediate and sharply mixed, with many fans on social media expressing bewilderment and some fright at his appearance. Public perception of Gritty became increasingly positive as Gritty's antics, which subverted the cuddly, family-friendly appearance and demeanor of other NHL mascots, gained more attention on social media. Gritty was lampooned on Last Week Tonight with John Oliver and Saturday Night Live.

Philadelphia residents embraced Gritty shortly after his debut as representing the city's "rough and tumble character". The Philadelphia City Council passed a formal resolution in 2018 honoring Gritty, declaring that he honored the city's spirit and passion. Within two months, the mascot amassed almost 200,000 Twitter followers. Gritty was the top league mascot in a 2019 vote of the NHL Players' Association.

Gritty has been employed as a leftist icon, as activists identified with the mascot's "cheerful, unkempt, maniacal demeanor", and googly-eyed, anarchic mirth. Gritty appeared on a banner at a Philadelphia protest against Donald Trump a week after his debut and was spread through leftist online forums and Internet meme groups, which depicted Gritty with themes of anti-capitalism, socialism, and anti-fascism. Philadelphia City Council member Helen Gym described the Trump vs. Gritty phenomenon: "One orange horror has been met with another." When Philadelphia played an important role in determining the 2020 United States presidential election, social media users depicted Gritty as the city personified, defeating outgoing incumbent Trump, which included appropriating Trump's statement that "Bad things happen in Philadelphia!".

Philadelphia composer Melissa Dunphy adapted text from Philadelphia City Council member Helen Gym's "A Resolution" for her choral composition "A Gritty Resolution". The piece is a humorous ode to the city's mascot and was commissioned and performed by the Philadelphia a capella group PhilHarmonia in 2024.
