= Mrs. Met =

Mascot of New York Mets baseball team

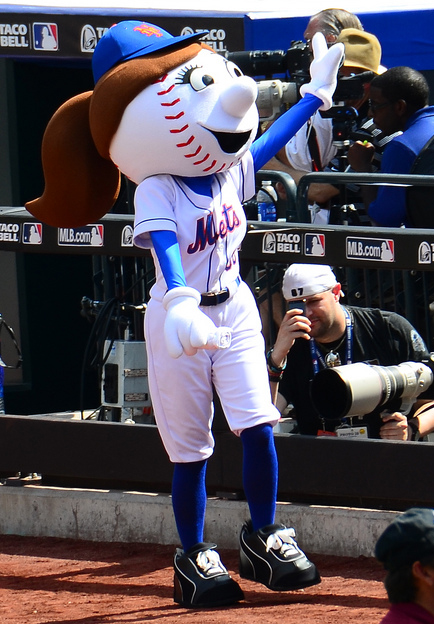
- Mrs. Met in 2013
- Team: New York Mets
- Description: Woman with a baseball for a head; companion of Mr. Met
- Website: https://www.mlb.com/mets/fans/the-story-of-mr-met

Mrs. Met (previously referred to as Lady Met) is an official mascot of Major League Baseball's New York Mets. She is the companion of Mr. Met and is among the oldest of the MLB's mascots. In 2026, Mrs. Met became the first female mascot to be elected into the Mascot Hall of Fame.

== Origin and early years ==
Lady Met was introduced by the Mets organization in the mid-1960s, soon after the Mets’ inaugural season. She is one of Major League Baseball's oldest mascots. Like her male counterpart, Lady Met was a human with a large baseball head. Unlike Mr. Met, however, Lady Met had hair. She appeared in print advertisements and pennants in cartoon form, and she also took the form of various toys and trinkets, including small figurines, pins, and cloth dolls. She would sometimes appear with three “little Mets”.

In the 1970s, following the real life marriage of Lady Met performer Lynn Farrell to the performer inside the Mr. Met costume, the Mets organization started referring to Lady Met as Mrs. Met, and she appeared as a live mascot at home games at Shea Stadium. Her head at the time was a plaster-of-paris ball that a character actor would wear around the stadium during the singing of the National Anthem and in the 5th and 7th innings.

Mr. and Mrs. Met were both phased out by the Mets in the 1980s. Mr. Met came back to the team in 1994, but Mrs. Met would remain out of the public eye for some years to come.

== Revival ==
In the early 2000s Mrs. Met re-appeared in the media with a spot on a commercial for the ESPN news show, SportsCenter. Mrs. Met was seen in the front passenger seat of a sports utility vehicle as the Met family left a Mets game. While she spoke to Mr. Met (in subtitles), three little Met children sat in the second row.

The Mets organization reportedly revived Mrs. Met very briefly in 2005. But it wasn't until 2013 that the team brought Mrs. Met back to Queens in earnest. That year, the Mets were set to host the Major League Baseball All-Star Game at Citi Field. A few weeks before the game, the Mets announced that a new Mrs. Met mascot would meet with fans and appear during the All-Star Game festivities. A senior Mets official reported that Mrs. Met had been “working as an event planner and was ready to return to full-time work now that her children are grown.” In addition to her on-field appearances, Mrs. Met appears for non-game-day events. Her first name is Jan.

Mrs. Jan Met became the first female mascot elected to the Mascot Hall of Fame, in the class of 2026. This made the Mets the first team to have two mascots in the hall (the other being Mr. Met, who was in the class of 2007).
