= The Coyote (mascot) =

Mascot of the San Antonio Spurs

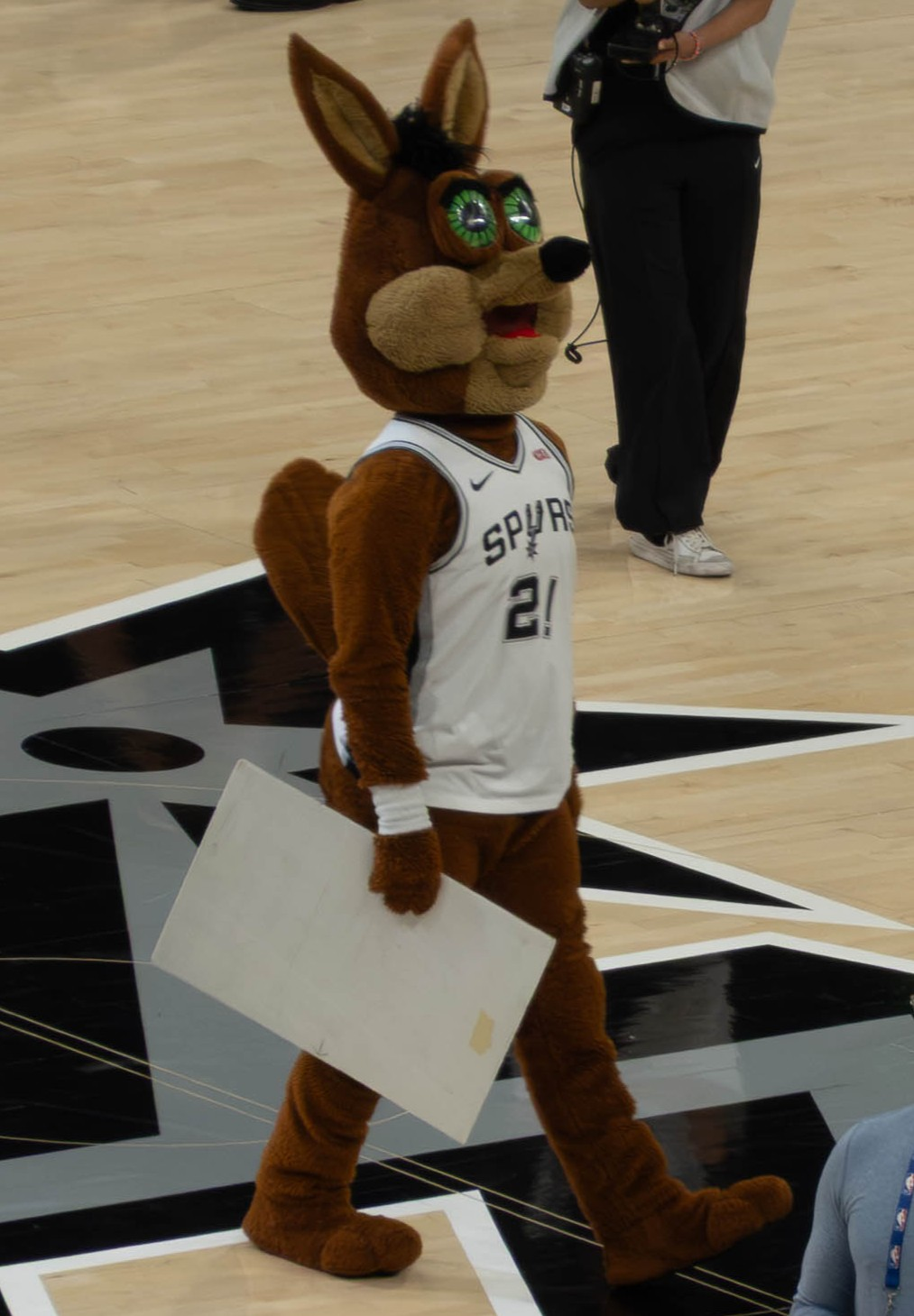
The Coyote holding a sign at a San Antonio Spurs game.

The Coyote is the official mascot of the San Antonio Spurs, a professional basketball team in the National Basketball Association (NBA). First introduced in 1983, he was inducted into the Mascot Hall of Fame in 2007.

== History ==
The Coyote was first introduced in public at a San Antonio Spurs game on April 13, 1983. He's known for his slapstick comedy routine, including impromptu interactions with game officials during time-outs, rehearsed skits and dance numbers with the Silver Dancers (the Spurs cheerleading team), as well as for his trick filled antics, such as riding a unicycle, pulling his eyes off, dribbling a ball with his feet or spinning a ball on a pen.

Outside of his presence at games the Coyote performs at over 400 community appearances per year, which is noted as being more than any other mascot in the NBA. Over the years he has also been featured in numerous local San Antonio area TV commercials and appeared on national morning shows, including Live with Regis and Kathie Lee.

The Coyote concept was created by Tim Derk, who also performed the role for the first 21 years — appearing in more than 1,100 games and making over 4,000 community appearances — before suffering a stroke that forced him to leave the job on February 13, 2004. During his time as Coyote, Derk was credited with inventing the T-Shirt Cannon Derk went on to be named Manager of Mascot Development by Spurs Sports & Entertainment six months later.

The Coyote won several awards for his performances throughout the years. In 2006, he was named Best Mascot of the Year 2005 by the website Gameops.com. In 2007, he was inducted into the Mascot Hall of Fame, in recognition of his hard work on and off the court. In 2014 and 2020, he was named Best Mascot of the Year by his fellow mascots.
