= Roger Landry =

Canadian businessman (1934–2020)

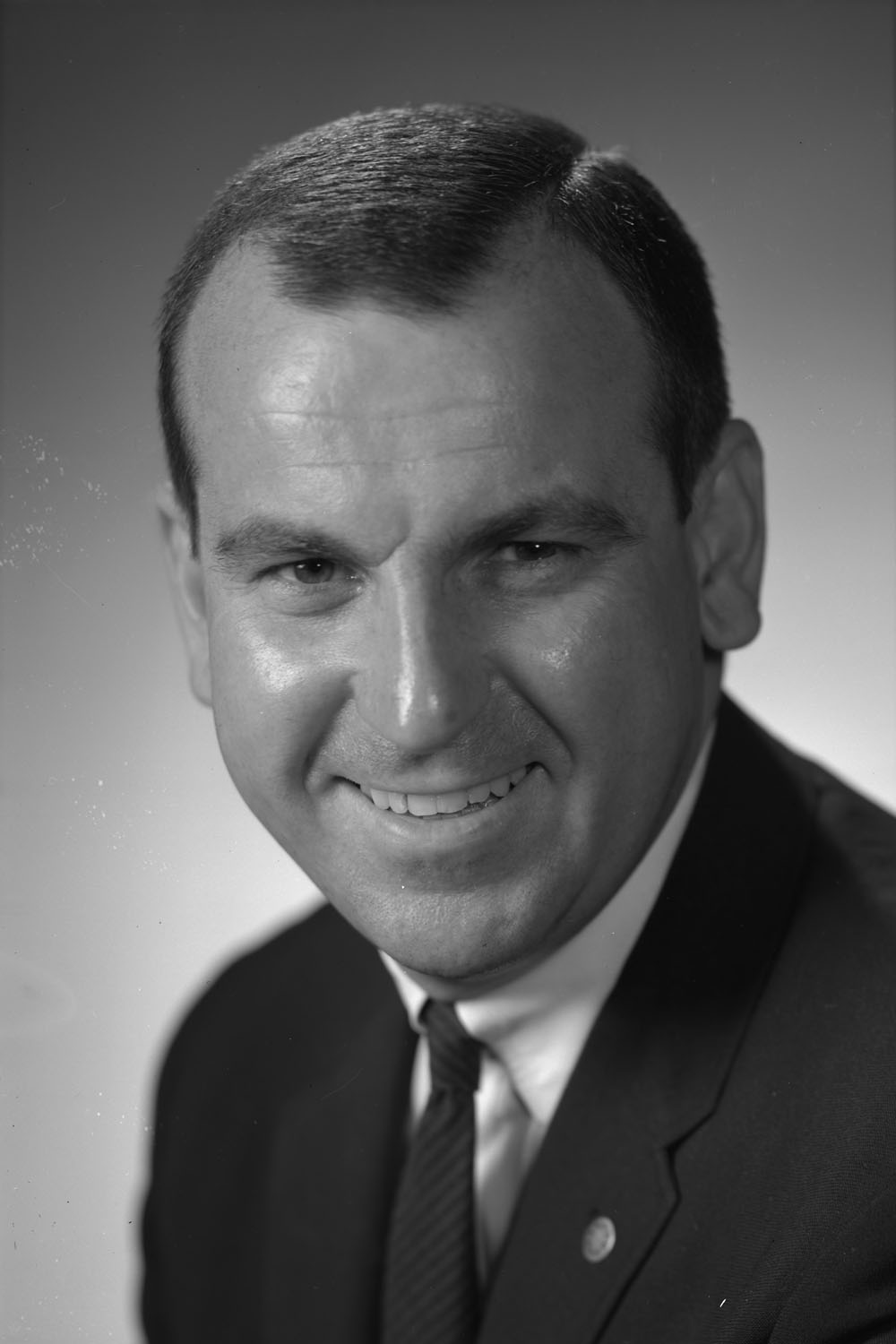
- Landry in 1966
- Born: January 26, 1934; Montreal, Quebec
- Died: February 1, 2020 (aged 86)
- Known for: President and publisher of La Presse
- Awards: Order of Canada

Roger D. Landry CC OQ (January 26, 1934 – February 1, 2020) was a Canadian businessman who was president and publisher of La Presse.

Born in Montreal, he was educated in Montreal, Paris, and London. He started his career with Bell Canada working with the Quebec government and helped to design a mobile telephone network for the Sûreté du Québec. In 1965, he was named assistant director of public relations for Expo 67 and later was the director in charge of receiving heads of state and important visitors.

In 1970, he founded a public relations firm and later joined ITT-Rayonnier as vice-president of administration. In 1977, he became the Vice-President of Marketing and Public Affairs for the Montreal Expos and helped to create the mascot Youppi.

From 1980 to 2000, he was the president and publisher of the Montreal newspaper La Presse.

He published his first novel Le Sans tache in 2002.

== Honours ==
- In 1986, he was made a Member of the Order of Canada.
- In 1989, he received the Grande médaille de Vermeil from Paris.
- In 1990, he was promoted to Officer of the Order of Canada.
- In 1996, he was promoted to Companion of the Order of Canada.
- In 1992, he was made an Officer of the National Order of Quebec.
- In 1995, he received Award of Merit by the B'nai B'rith Foundation
- In 1998, he was made a Chevalier de l'Ordre de la Légion d'honneur by the French government.
- In 2002, he was elected president of the colonels and lieutenant colonels of the 34th and 35th Infantry Brigades of the Canadian Army.
- He was an honorary Colonel in the Les Fusiliers Mont-Royal.
- He received an honorary Doctor of Law honoris causa of McGill University.
- He received a Doctor of Literature of the Université de Sherbrooke.
- He received a Doctor of Administration of the Royal Military College of Canada.
