= Mascot Hall of Fame =

Hall of fame for North American sports mascots

- Established: 2005
- Location: Online
- Type: Hall of fame
- Founder: David Raymond
- Website: mascothalloffame.com

The Mascot Hall of Fame is an online museum for sports mascots. Prior to this, it operated a physical location between 2018 and 2024 as an interactive children's museum. It was founded by David Raymond who was the original Phillie Phanatic from 1978 to 1993, along with co-founder Christopher Bruce.

Mascots were first elected to the hall of fame in 2005. Subsequent elections occurred in 2006, 2007, and 2008. No additional elections took place until 2017. Regular inductions did not begin until 2022.

Mascots are elected into the Mascot Hall of Fame by the voting public and are reviewed by an executive committee made up of performers, sports executives, and other individuals intimate with the mascot community. The mascots go through a nomination process that ends with the executive committee selecting six finalist in each category to be placed on the ballot for consideration.

Over the years, the Mascot Hall of Fame has added additional awards, including Best Corporate Use for Brand, and Best Live Mascot.

To be eligible for the Mascot Hall of Fame, a mascot must have existed for a minimum of 10 years. They must also impact both their sport and community, inspire their fans, and consistently give memorable and groundbreaking performances.

== History ==
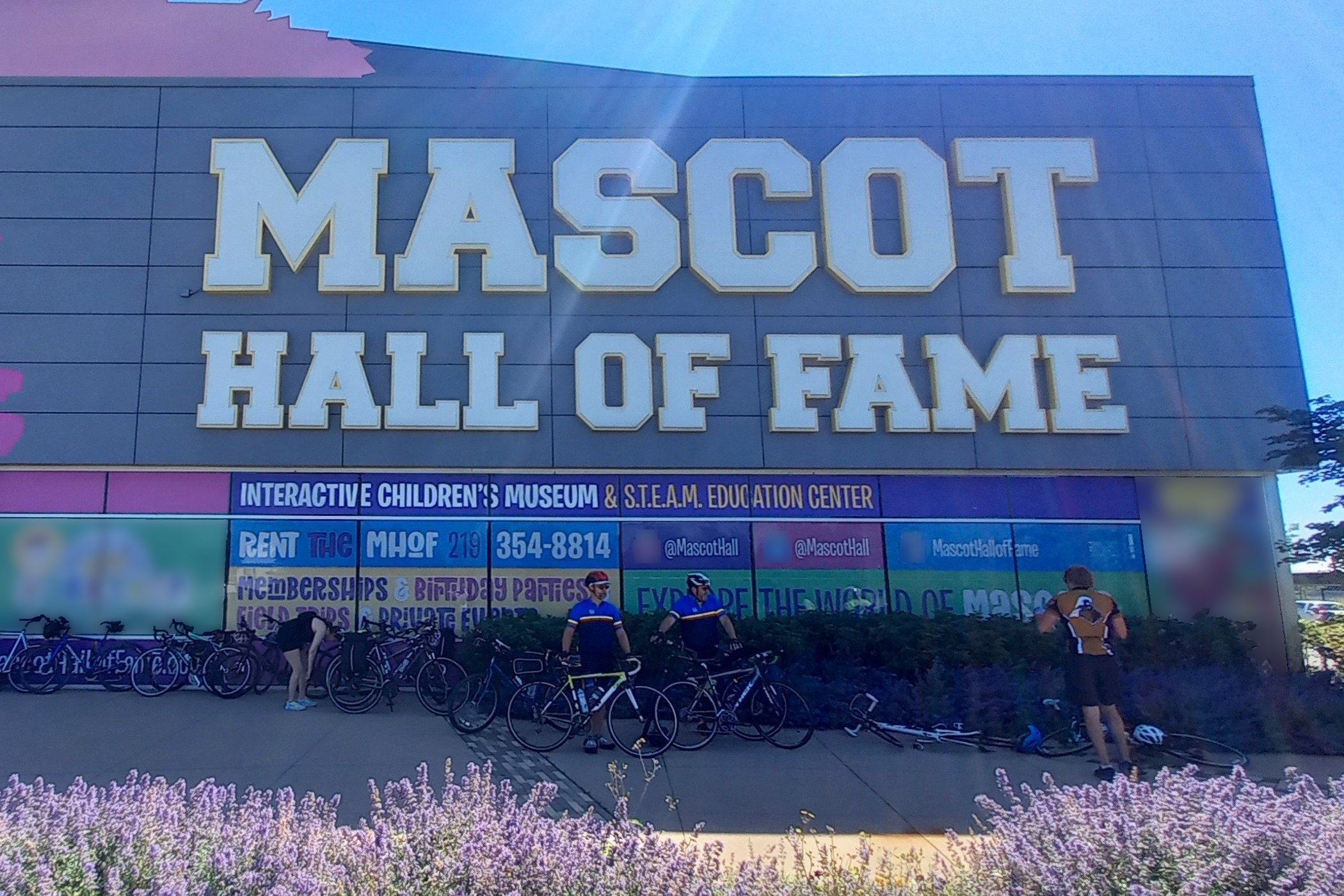
Former Mascot Hall of Fame museum, June 2024

The Mascot Hall of Fame was founded as an online-only hall by with an induction ceremony taking place each year in Philadelphia, Pennsylvania. However, in September 2014, Raymond's mascot company signed a memorandum of understanding with the City of Whiting, Indiana, to develop a permanent Mascot Hall of Fame on the south shore of Lake Michigan. The educational, STEAM based, fully interactive museum opened December 26, 2018. On July 22, 2024, the hall of fame announced that the Whiting, Indiana museum would close on September 14, 2024. The organization will continue online and are actively searching for a new location to host the museum.

Raymond has stepped back from day to day engagement with the Hall which is now run by his co-founder and curator of the Hall, Christopher Bruce.

Mrs. Met became the first female mascot elected to the Mascot Hall of Fame in the class of 2026. This made the New York Mets the first team to have two mascots in the hall (the other being Mr. Met, who was in the class of 2007).

== Inductees ==
Name	Organization	Location	Description	Sport	Division	Inducted
Phillie Phanatic	Philadelphia Phillies	Philadelphia, PA	Green flightless bird	Baseball	MLB	2005
Suns Gorilla	Phoenix Suns	Phoenix, AZ	Gorilla	Basketball	NBA	2005
The Famous Chicken	San Diego Padres (unofficial)	San Diego, CA	Chicken	Baseball	MLB	2005
Aubie the Tiger	Auburn University	Auburn, AL	Tiger	Various sports	NCAA	2006
Bucky Badger	University of Wisconsin–Madison	Madison, WI	Badger	Various sports	NCAA	2006
Clutch	Houston Rockets	Houston, TX	Bear	Basketball	NBA	2006
Jazz Bear	Utah Jazz	Salt Lake City, UT	Bear	Basketball	NBA	2006
K. C. Wolf	Kansas City Chiefs	Kansas City, MO	Wolf	American football	NFL	2006
YoUDee	University of Delaware	Newark, DE	Blue Hen Chicken	Various sports	NCAA	2006
Big Red	Western Kentucky University	Bowling Green, KY	Furry red blob	Various sports	NCAA	2007
Brutus Buckeye	Ohio State University	Columbus, OH	Buckeye nut	Various sports	NCAA	2007
The Coyote	San Antonio Spurs	San Antonio, TX	Coyote	Basketball	NBA	2007
Lil' Red	University of Nebraska–Lincoln	Lincoln, NE	Inflatable boy	Various sports	NCAA	2007
Mr. Met	New York Mets	Flushing, NY	Humanoid with baseball head	Baseball	MLB	2007
Rocky the Mountain Lion	Denver Nuggets	Denver, CO	Mountain Lion	Basketball	NBA	2008
Slider	Cleveland Guardians	Cleveland, OH	Furry purple creature	Baseball	MLB	2008
Smokey	University of Tennessee	Knoxville, TN	Bluetick Coonhound	Various sports	NCAA	2008
Nittany Lion	Pennsylvania State University	State College, PA	Mountain Lion	Various sports	NCAA	2019
Benny the Bull	Chicago Bulls	Chicago, IL	Bull	Basketball	NBA	2019
Tommy Hawk	Chicago Blackhawks	Chicago, IL	Hawk	Hockey	NHL	2019
Sluggerrr	Kansas City Royals	Kansas City, MO	Lion	Baseball	MLB	2019
Blue	Indianapolis Colts	Indianapolis, IN	Horse	American football	NFL	2020
Boomer	Indiana Pacers	Indianapolis, IN	Cat	Basketball	NBA	2020
The Oriole Bird	Baltimore Orioles	Baltimore, MD	Baltimore oriole	Baseball	MLB	2020
Youppi!	Montreal Expos and Montreal Canadiens	Montreal, QC	Furry orange creature	Baseball and Hockey	MLB and NHL	2020
Globie	Harlem Globetrotters	Harlem, NY	Court jester	Basketball	Independent	2022
Southpaw	Chicago White Sox	Chicago, IL	Primate fuzzy green dude	Baseball	MLB	2022
Otto the Orange	Syracuse Orange	Syracuse, NY	Orange	Various sports	NCAA	2023
Slugger	Portland Sea Dogs	Portland, ME	Sea Dog (Harbor seal)	Baseball	MiLB	2023
Jaxson de Ville	Jacksonville Jaguars	Jacksonville, FL	Jaguar	American football	NFL	2024
Lou Seal	San Francisco Giants	San Francisco, CA	Seal	Baseball	MLB	2024
Monte	Montana Grizzlies and Lady Griz	Missoula, MT	Grizzly Bear	Various Sports	NCAA	2024
Orbit	Houston Astros	Houston, TX	Furry green alien	Baseball	MLB	2024
Blitz	Seattle Seahawks	Seattle, WA	Sea Hawk	American football	NFL	2025
Fredbird	St. Louis Cardinals	St. Louis, MO	Cardinal	Baseball	MLB	2025
Sebastian the Ibis	Miami Hurricanes	Miami, FL	American white ibis	Various Sports	NCAA	2025
S.J. Sharkie	San Jose Sharks	San Jose, CA	Great White Shark	Hockey	NHL	2025
Toro	Houston Texans	Houston, TX	Bull	American football	NFL	2025
Cocky	South Carolina Gamecocks	Columbia, SC	Gamecock	Various Sports	NCAA	2026
Cosmo the Cougar	BYU Cougars	Provo, UT	Cougar	Various Sports	NCAA	2026
Goldy Gopher	Minnesota Golden Gophers	Minneapolis, MN	Gopher	Various Sports	NCAA	2026
Miles	Denver Broncos	Denver, CO	Bronco	American football	NFL	2026
Mrs. Met	New York Mets	Flushing, NY	Humanoid with baseball head	Baseball	MLB	2026

== Gallery ==
The Phillie Phanatic with the Montreal Expos' Andrés Galarraga in 1987

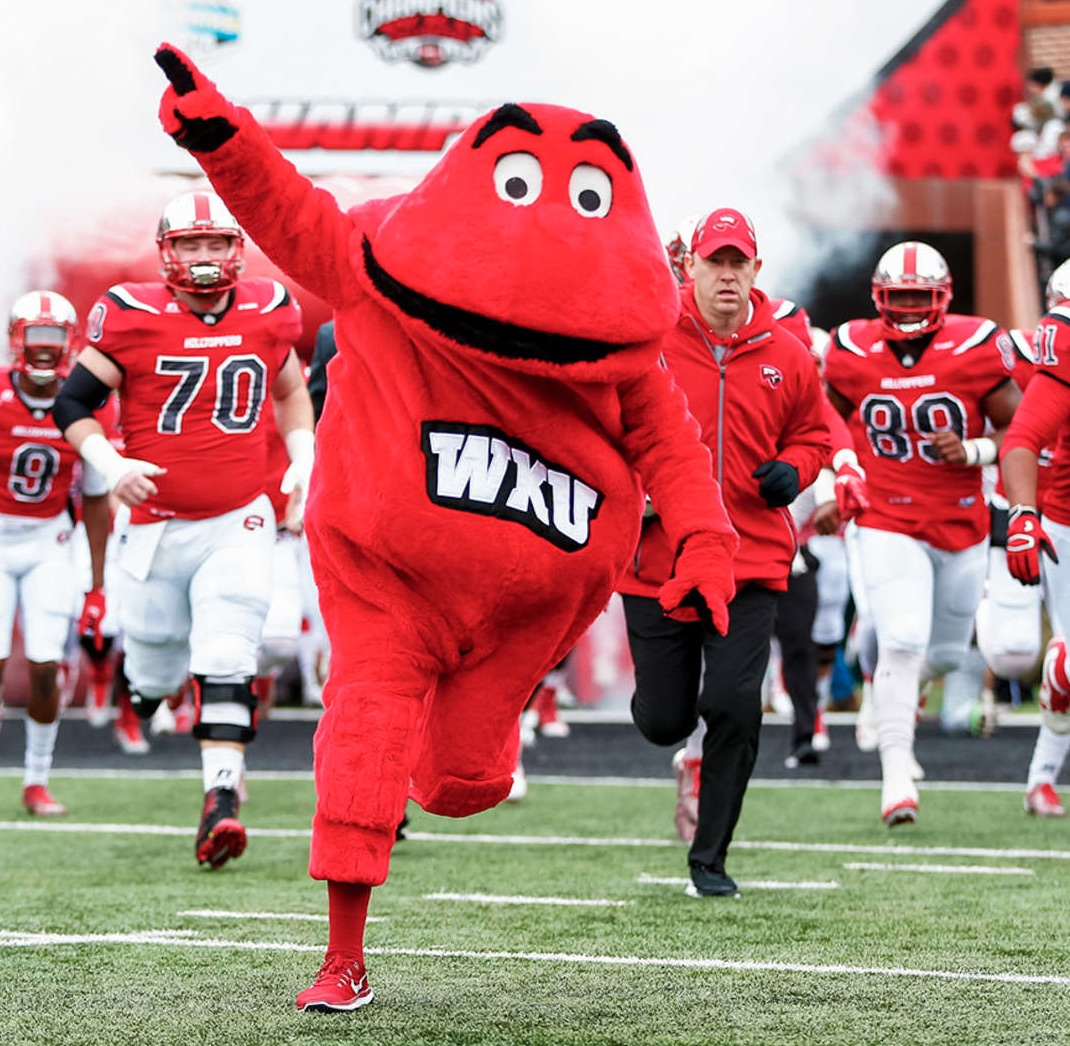
Western Kentucky's HOF mascot Big Red

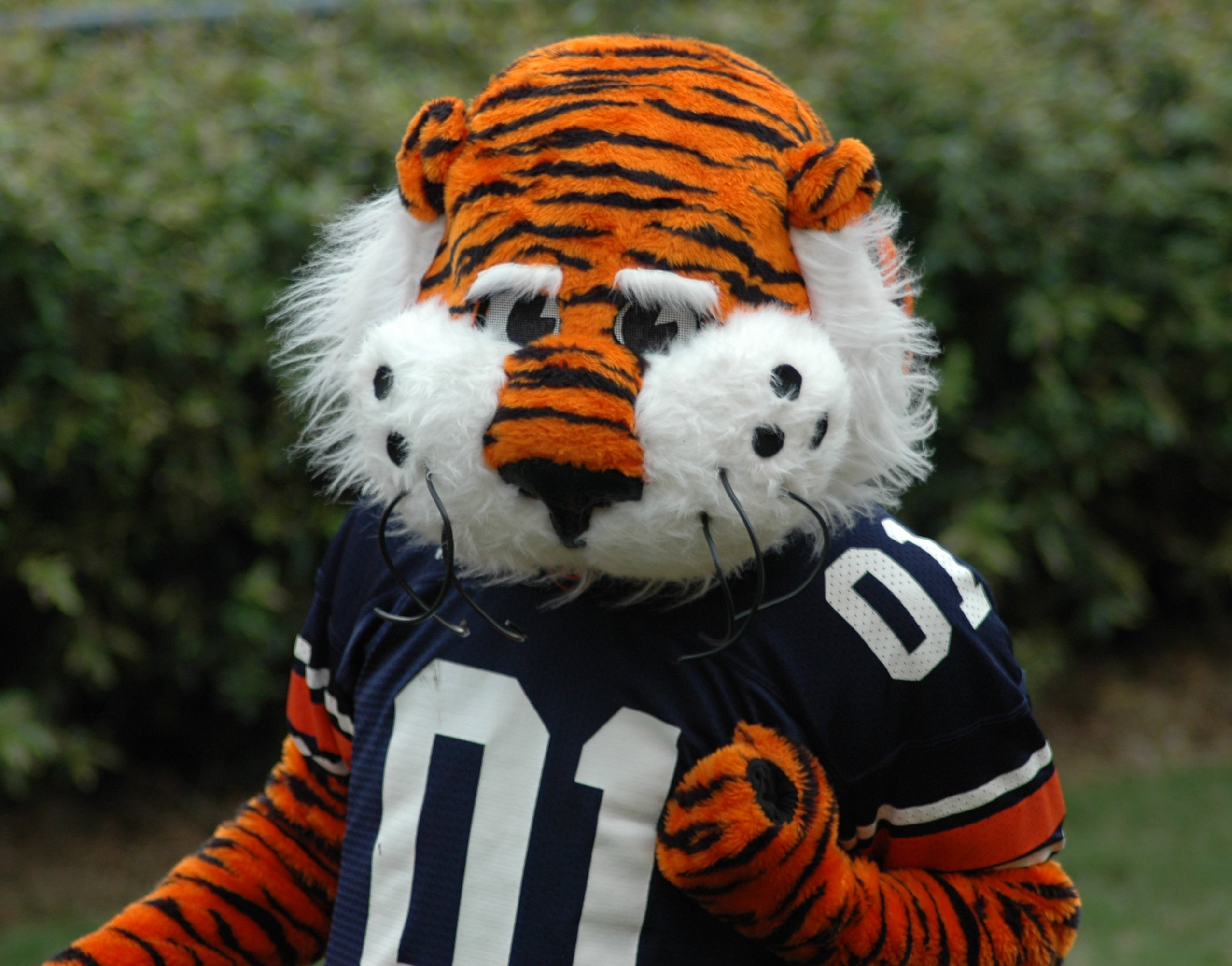
Aubie, Auburn University's mascot

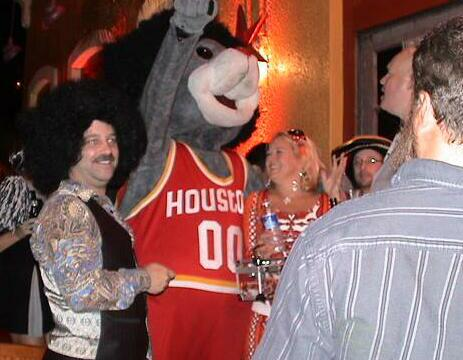
Clutch the Bear, the mascot of the Houston Rockets, on Halloween 2005

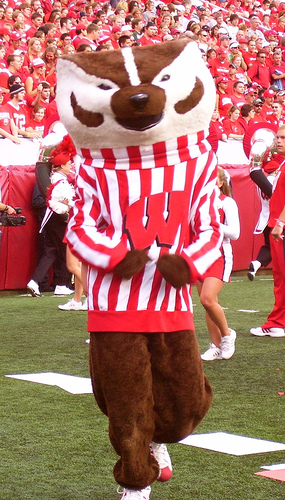
Bucky Badger, University of Wisconsin-Madison's mascot

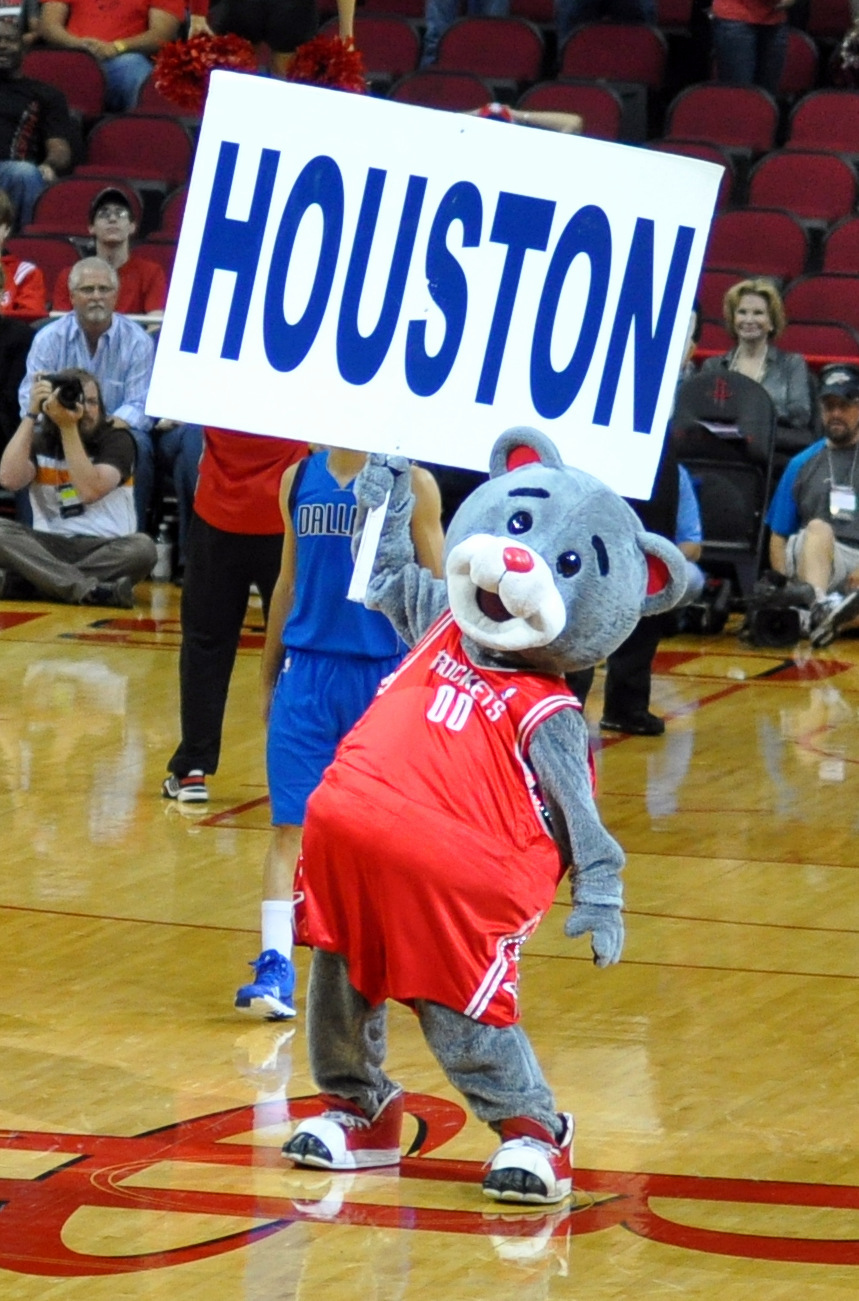
Clutch in 2013

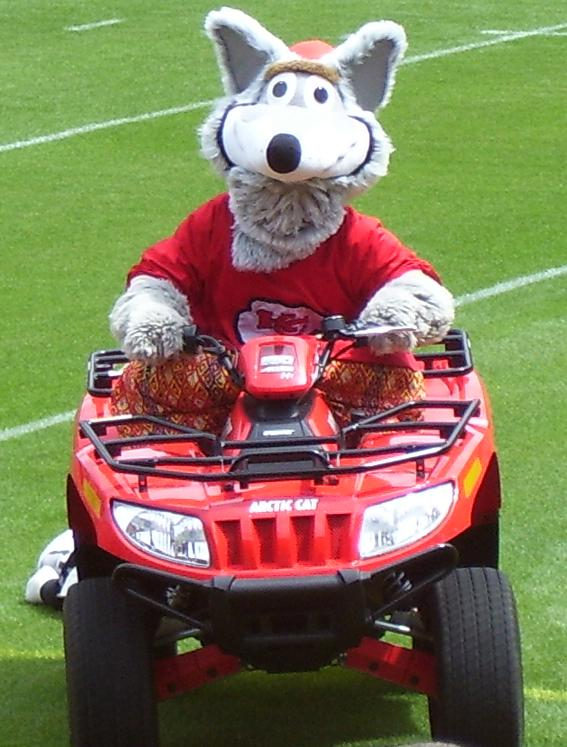
K.C. Wolf, the mascot of the Kansas City Chiefs

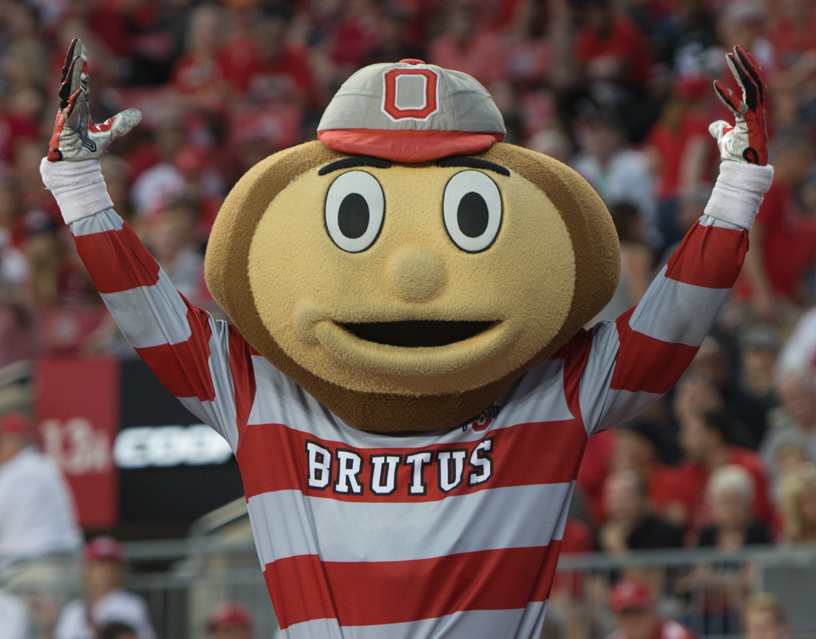
Brutus Buckeye, Ohio State University's mascot

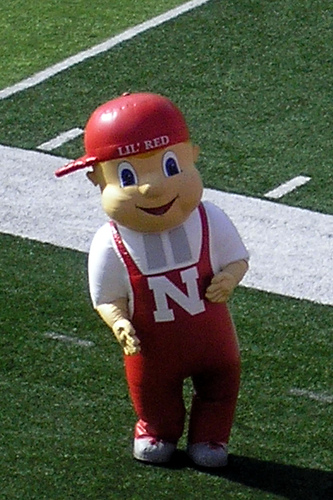
Lil' Red, University of Nebraska's mascot

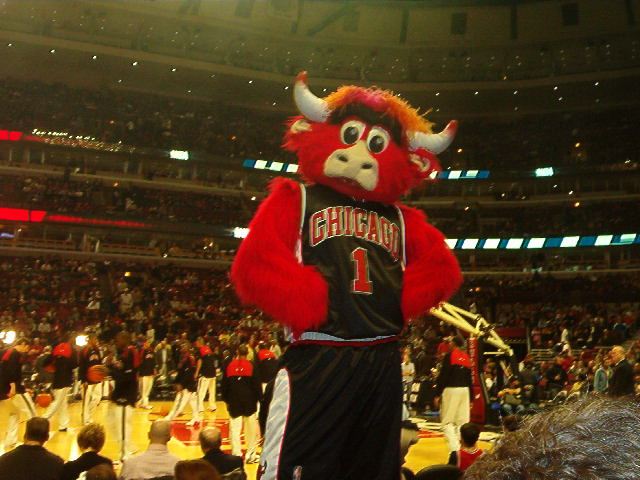
Benny the Bull, the mascot of the Chicago Bulls

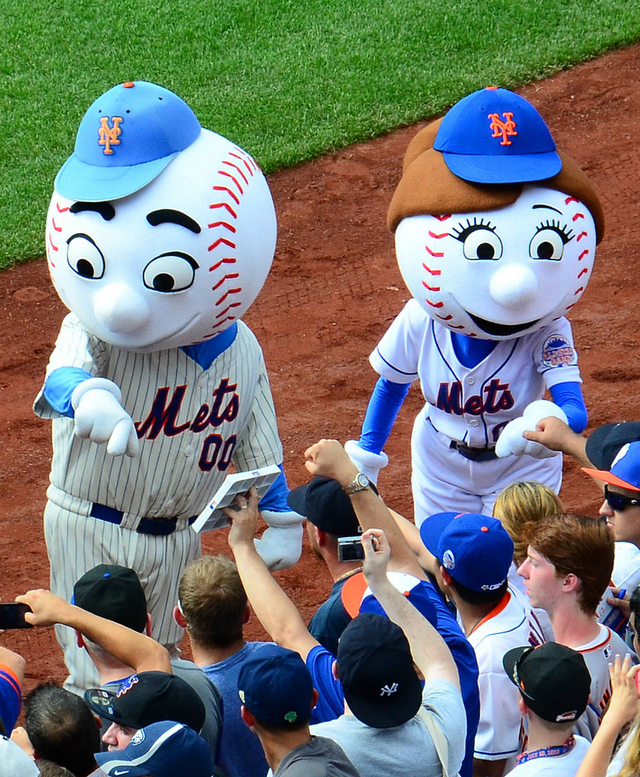
Mr. Met and Mrs. Met, the mascots of the New York Mets

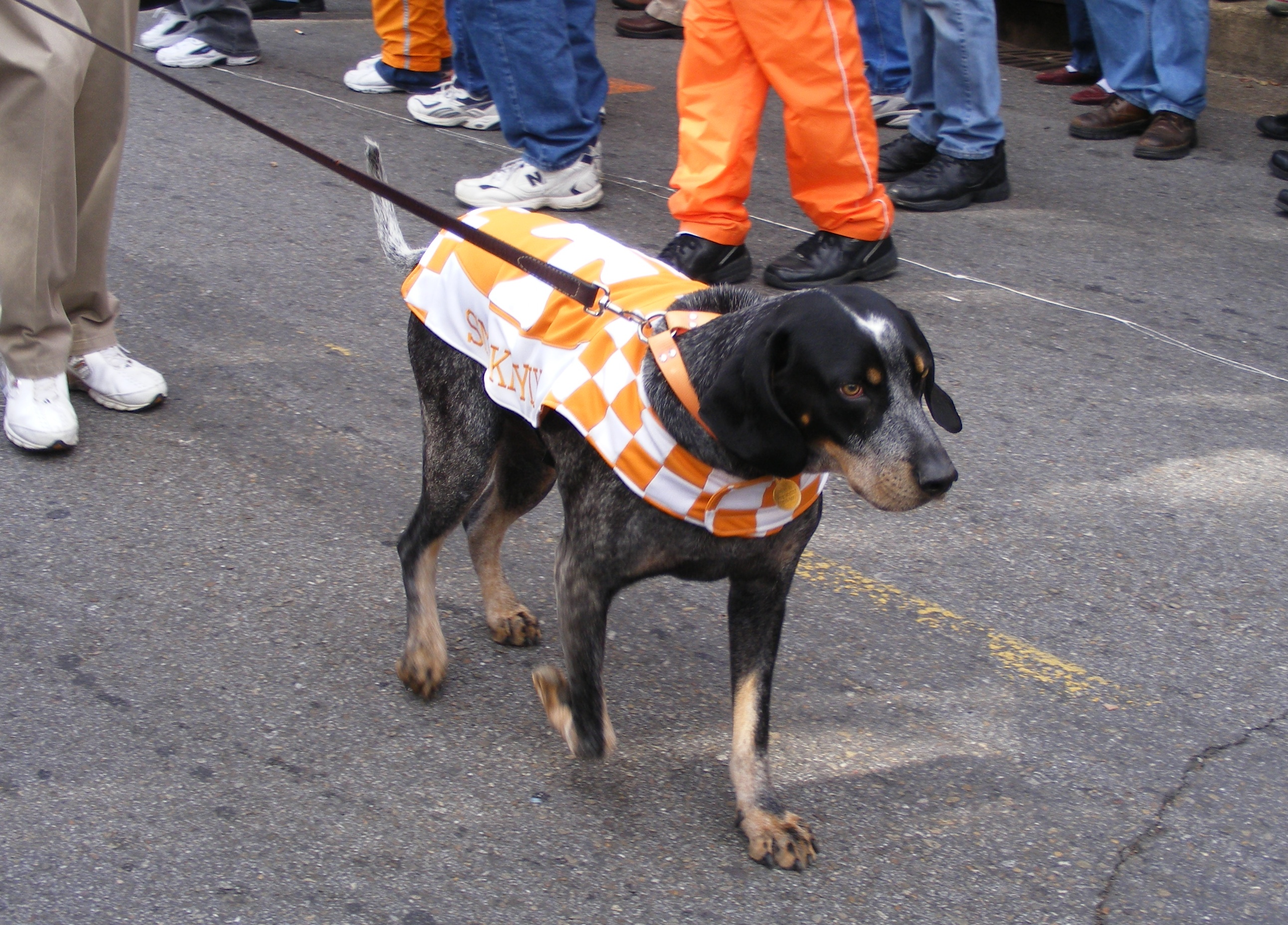
Smokey IX, former mascot of the University of Tennessee
