= Blue (NFL mascot) =

Mascot for the NFL's Indianapolis Colts

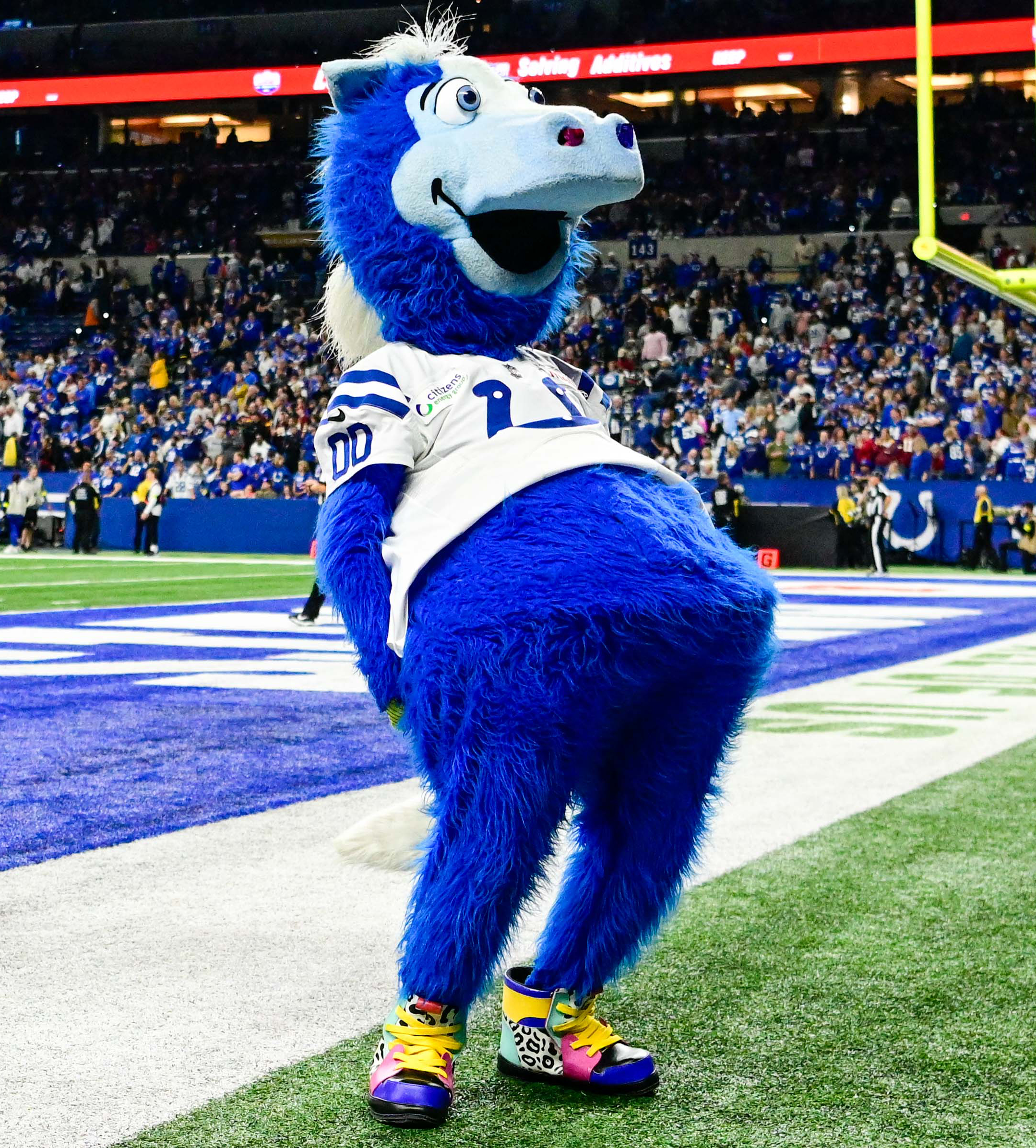
Blue at Lucas Oil Stadium in 2022

Blue is the official mascot of the Indianapolis Colts professional American football team of the National Football League. He is an anthropomorphic blue horse who wears a white Colts jersey with a horseshoe on the front. He was first introduced on September 17, 2006, in the Colts' first home regular season game against the Houston Texans at the RCA Dome, in which they won 43–24. The Indianapolis Colts would go on to win Super Bowl XLI at the end of Blue's first season, defeating the Chicago Bears for their second Super Bowl title.

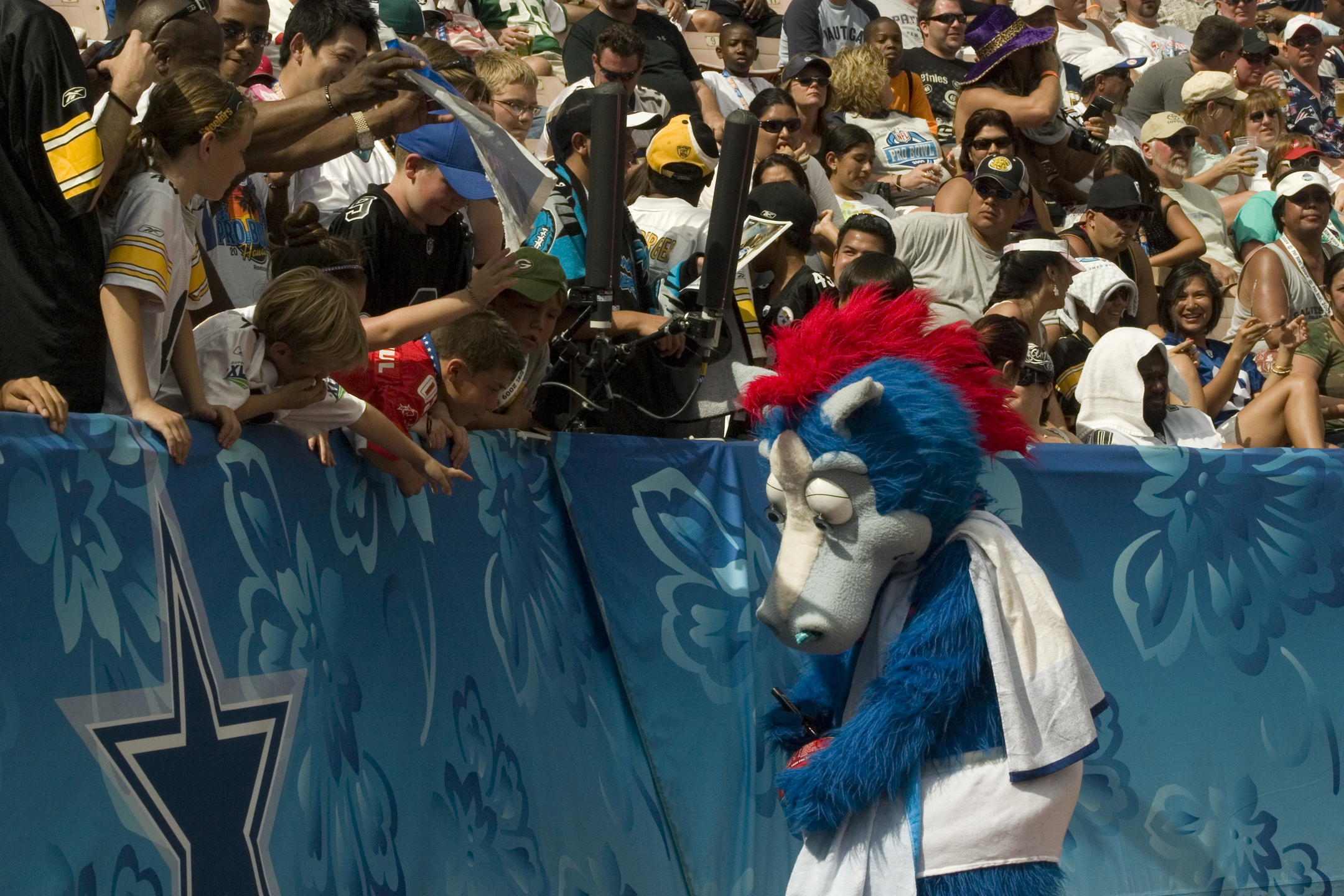
Blue signing an autograph at the 2009 Pro Bowl

Before Blue was introduced, the team had two inflatable football player mascots, only known as "#1" and "#2". Before them, they had an anthropomorphic football character known as Spike, and the team's initial mascot was Huddles, a gray horse.

In 2016, the 32 NFL mascots voted for Blue to receive the inaugural NFL Mascot of the Year award. Blue was once again voted Mascot of the Year in 2019, 2023, 2025, and most recently, 2026. He was also awarded Skit of the Year in 2017, 2018, and 2019, and he represented the Colts at the Pro Bowl in 2009 and 2011.

Blue was inducted into the Mascot Hall of Fame in 2020; the museum and children's center, based in Whiting, Indiana, was founded by David Raymond, who was the original Phillie Phanatic. Blue was the second NFL mascot inducted into the Mascot Hall of Fame, after Kansas City Chiefs' mascot K.C. Wolf was inducted in 2006.

Blue is popular on social media, with a TikTok following of almost 9 million as of September 2025. His popularity comes from short-form comedy sketches, recurring bits such as pieing and trickshot attempts.

== Relationships ==
Since Peyton Manning has played for both the Denver Broncos and Indianapolis Colts, Blue and the Broncos' mascot, Miles, are portrayed as having a strained relationship. In a 2017 Papa John's commercial featuring both characters, Miles showed signs of aggravation towards Blue while Manning was attempting to introduce the two mascots to each other, causing Blue to be nervous.
