= Phillie Phanatic =

Mascot of the Philadelphia Phillies

- The Phanatic in March 2016
- Team: Philadelphia Phillies
- Description: Large, furry, green creature
- Origin of name: Fanatical Philadelphia fans (stylized as "Phanatic" to match the city of Philadelphia)
- First seen: April 25, 1978
- Hall of Fame: 2005
- Website: Official Website

The Phillie Phanatic is the official mascot for the Philadelphia Phillies Major League Baseball team. He is a large, furry, green creature with a party horn tongue. He performs various routines to entertain fans during baseball games at Citizens Bank Park and spring training, and makes public relations and goodwill appearances for the Phillies.

The Phanatic has repeatedly been ranked among the best and most recognizable sports mascots, including being named number one in multiple polls and rankings.

== Creation ==
During the winter after the 1976 season, the Phillies' Marketing Director Dennis Lehman and Promotions Director Frank Sullivan thought the team needed a mascot similar to the Padres' San Diego Chicken and created the Phanatic in partnership with Harrison/Erickson, the design company of Wayde Harrison and Bonnie Erickson. Erickson had previously designed Miss Piggy and Statler and Waldorf for Jim Henson's Muppets.

Instead of a number on the back of his jersey, he wears a star and was named for the fanatical fans of the team. According to Bill Giles, the Phanatic was created to attract more families to the Phillies' home, Veterans Stadium.

The Phanatic replaced "Philadelphia Phil" and "Philadelphia Phillis", a pair of siblings dressed in 18th-century garb to invoke the city's revolutionary spirit from 1776. The pair were in the team logo from 1976 through 1978, and were part of the team's "Home Run Spectacular" at The Vet from 1971 through 1979. They reappeared with their replacement as the Phillies celebrated their final year at Veterans Stadium in 2003, including opening day and the final game.

The Phanatic debuted on April 25, 1978, at The Vet, when the Phils played the Chicago Cubs. He was formally introduced to the public on the locally produced children's show Captain Noah and His Magical Ark by then-Phillies player Tim McCarver, who was doing promotional work for the team.

In his book Pouring Six Beers at a Time, Giles wrote of the worst decision of his life when it came to the creation of the Phanatic. The design would cost $5,200 for both the costume and the copyright ownership, or $3,900 just for the costume with Harrison/Erickson retaining the copyright. Giles chose to just buy the costume. Five years later, when Giles and his group of investors bought the team from Ruly Carpenter, the franchise paid $250,000 to Harrison/Erickson for the assignment of the copyright.

== Portrayers ==
The Phanatic was originally portrayed by David Raymond. In 1976, Raymond had a summer internship within the team's front office. He returned in 1977. Raymond was asked to portray the mascot in 1978, which he did until 1993. Raymond's father is Delaware Blue Hens Hall of Fame coach Tubby Raymond. David Raymond was inducted into the Delaware Sports Hall of Fame in 2024. Since 1993, Tom Burgoyne has portrayed the Phanatic, although in public – in order to retain the illusion that the Phanatic is a real creature – Burgoyne maintains that he is only the Phanatic's "best friend".

A major change occurred in the Phanatic's portrayal because Raymond is left-handed while Burgoyne is right-handed – despite Raymond's desire that his replacement be left-handed.

=== Appearance change ===
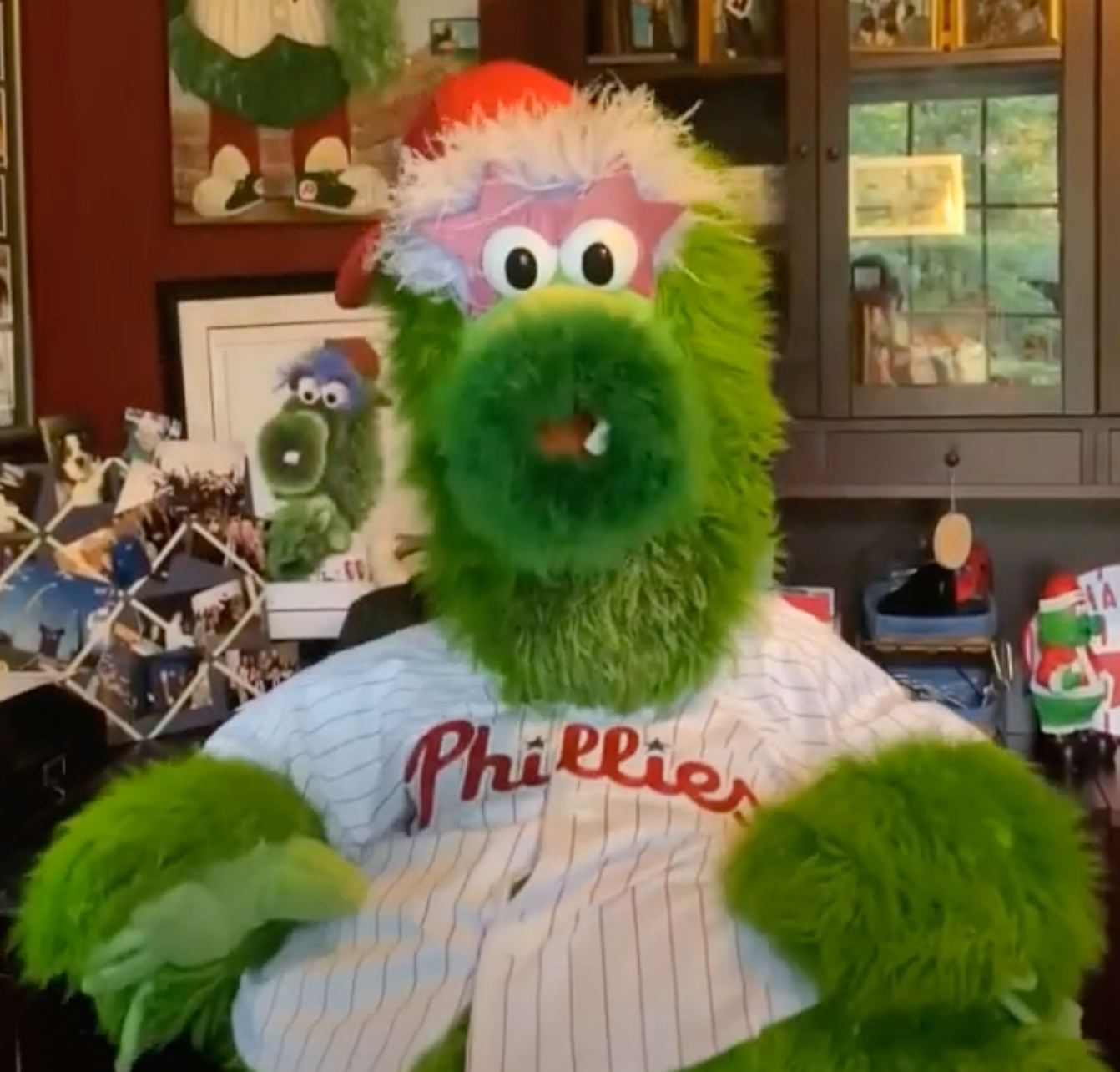
The altered Phillie Phanatic used in 2020 and 2021

On August 2, 2019, the Phillies filed a lawsuit against the Phanatic creators for exercising their rights to renegotiate the 1984 licensing assignment according to copyright law. In response, in 2020, the Phillies unveiled an updated Phanatic, which included lighter-green fur, arm-scales, star-shaped eyelids, powder-blue feathers, a longer tail, a shorter nose and red shoes.

The Phillies regained the rights to original Phanatic beginning in the 2022 season after a settlement with Harrison/Erickson, the mascot's copyright owners and the creators.

== Performance ==
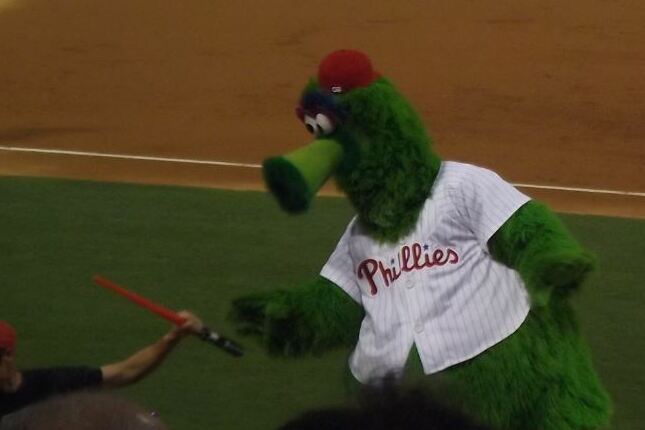
When the Phillies hosted a "Star Wars night" in August 2014, the Phanatic got in on the fun by using a lightsaber atop the visitors' dugout.

The Phanatic rides around on an ATV. During games, the Phanatic wanders the stadium, greeting fans and humorously mocking supporters of the opposition. The Phanatic performs a number of regular routines on the field before the game and between innings. Some of these routines are:

- Taunting the visiting team by dancing provocatively in front of their dugout, mocking the actions of their players, and smashing or stomping on an object, such as a batting helmet, representing the team.
- Standing on the roof of the Phillies dugout between halves of the seventh inning for "The Phanatic Dance" and remaining on the dugout roof for the home half of the inning to "hex" the opposing pitcher.
- Warming up in the bullpen.
- Shooting hot dogs into the stands using a pneumatic gun attached to his ATV.
- Visiting the various broadcast booths and committing various pranks on the broadcasters such as pouring popcorn or spraying Silly String on them, or serving them Philly cheesesteaks.
- Buffing the heads of any bald fans who happen to be sitting near him in the stands.

His mother, Phoebe Phanatic, occasionally appears on-field with the Phanatic. He also has a younger cousin Phred, and a girlfriend Phiona who are rarely seen. According to the Phanatic's official biography, his birthplace is the Galápagos Islands. In 2015, the Phillies introduced four inflatable mascots that act as sidekicks to the Phanatic. Known as the "Galápagos Gang", the mascots include Sid the Sea Lion, Bessie the Blue-footed Booby, Calvin the Giant Tortoise, and Iggy the Iguana.

The Phillie Phanatic with the Montreal Expos' Andrés Galarraga in 1987

The Phanatic's favorite umpire was the late Eric Gregg, a Philadelphia native, and he would greet him enthusiastically on the field when Gregg was in charge. Gregg would often play along with the Phanatic between innings, sometimes dancing with him or otherwise participating in his routines.

One week before the Phillies had their 2006 opener, the Phanatic was "dyed" red as part of the team's week-long promotion to "Paint the Town Red". He was "dipped into a special paint" made by a team sponsor MAB Paints (now Sherwin-Williams) and changed from green to red. He returned to his regular color in time for the season opener for that year. This was repeated for the 2007 season, as he became red at a Philadelphia Fire Department station to help raise funds for smoke alarms in Philadelphia, raising over $4,000. "Paint the Town Red Week" has been repeated prior to the 2008, 2009, 2010, 2011, 2012, and 2013 seasons.

There is a running gag where the Phanatic humorously mocks opposition players and they would steal his ATV keys in retaliation. However, the Phanatic's antics are not always popular with opposition players and coaches. During a September 1982 game, Cardinals outfielder (and former Phillies player) Lonnie Smith did not take kindly to the Phanatic's taunts and tackled the mascot mid game out of frustration. Dodgers' manager Tommy Lasorda in particular did not like the Phanatic's mocking of the Dodgers. In 1988, he assaulted the Phillie Phanatic during a nationally televised game after the Phanatic stomped on a life-sized dummy wearing Lasorda's uniform (reportedly provided by Dodger infielder Steve Sax).

The Phanatic also has the dubious distinction of being the most sued mascot in sports. In 2010, a woman filed suit claiming that the Phanatic injured her knee at a minor league game.

== In popular culture ==
In the 1970s, the Philadelphia Inquirer had a daily comic strip showing the adventures of the Phanatic.

The Phanatic appeared on the television series Where in the World is Carmen Sandiego? in the episode "Phind that Phanatic" where The Phanatic is kidnapped by Top Grunge.

The Phanatic appeared on the episode of the television series Jon and Kate Plus 8 titled "Baseball Game with Daddy", where Jon took Cara and all three boys to a Phillies game.

The Phanatic's head disappeared during the Phillies' "Final Pieces" charity sale and auction in 2004. Tom Burgoyne had taken off the costume for a break and found the head missing when he returned. One week later, someone anonymously called a local radio station claiming that he found the head and would bring it to the radio station. Police arrested and charged Bernard Bechtel with felony theft after he brought the $3,000 head to the station.

The Phillie Phanatic with fans at Veterans Stadium at a Camera Day pre-game event in 1987

The Phillie Phanatic in the stands of Veterans Stadium on Opening Day, 1986

The Phanatic appeared in the closing credits of the film Rocky Balboa (2006).

In March 2009, the Phanatic appeared on The Simpsons in the episode "Gone Maggie Gone", greeting a party of nuns disembarking from a ship at the future site of Philadelphia. In the episode "Dancin' Homer", there is a mascot that looks similar to the Phanatic, the Capital City Goofball.

In November 2009, the Phanatic was part of a bit on the Late Show with David Letterman called "Get to Know the Phillie Phanatic".

In 2010, the Phanatic appeared in the This is SportsCenter series of advertisements with Derek Jeter of the New York Yankees, where Jeter asks others in the ESPN locker room who used his razor, with the Phanatic's signature green hair sticking out from the blades.

The Phillie Phanatic dressed as Rocky Balboa during a game at Veterans Stadium on Opening Day, 1986.

The Phanatic was mimicked in an episode of It's Always Sunny in Philadelphia called "The World Series Defense". In the episode, Charlie's "Green Man" challenges that the "Phrenetic" (as it is referred to in the episode) should not be the only mascot for the Phillies. He is promptly put in his place by the "Phrenetic". In an interview with Angelo Cataldi, Tom Burgoyne revealed that Major League Baseball declined to allow the Phanatic to be used in the episode. Charlie references this at the conclusion of the episode, attempting to file a countersuit against Major League Baseball due to the fact that he has to call the mascot the "Phrenetic" when he knows its name is the "Phanatic".

On January 26, 2012, the Phanatic (credited to Tom Burgoyne) appeared as itself on an episode of the NBC sitcom 30 Rock called "The Ballad of Kenneth Parcell".

He and Mr. Met did a MasterCard commercial in 2013 to raise money for ending cancer.

In 2015, the podcast 99% Invisible did an episode about the evolution of mascots focusing on the creation of the Phanatic.

The Phanatic was on an episode of the show The Goldbergs in 2015 called "The Lost Boy", and made a cameo appearance on College GameDay when the ESPN show visited Philadelphia for a matchup between Temple and Notre Dame. It reappeared in a 2018 episode of The Goldbergs.

The Phanatic appeared on ABC's Schooled episode "Rocks for Jocks".

On June 1, 2022, the Phanatic was the subject of a Jeopardy! clue during an episode in which two of the three contestants, Ryan Long and Vanessa Williams, were from Philadelphia. In 2019, Alex Trebek told a contestant that he was "not a big fan" of the Phanatic.

== Honors ==
The Phanatic was voted "best mascot ever" by Sports Illustrated Kids. In January 2008, Forbes magazine named the Phanatic the best mascot in sports.

In 2005, David Raymond founded the Mascot Hall of Fame, and the Phanatic was inducted as a charter member. Since 2003, Burgoyne has written several children's books, published by the team, featuring the Phanatic.

In 2009, the Phanatic was one of several recipients of the Great Friend to Kids (GFTK) Awards, given by the Please Touch Museum (the Children's Museum of Philadelphia).

The Phillie Phanatic, along with Youppi! also designed by Erickson, the mascot of the Montreal Expos, and the San Diego Chicken, are the only mascots on display in the National Baseball Hall of Fame and Museum in Cooperstown, New York.

In 2010, an assortment of 5 feet (1.5 m) tall, 100 pounds (45 kg) fiberglass Phillie Phanatic statues were painted by artists and placed on display throughout Philadelphia from April through August with all proceeds going to Phillies' Charities.

In 2015, Good Morning America bestowed the honor of the best mascot in baseball on the Phanatic.

== Relation to other mascots ==
In 1989, Orlando's NBA expansion team, the Magic, was founded largely through the efforts of former Philadelphia 76ers General Manager Pat Williams. Williams introduced Stuff, another Bonnie Erickson design, a furry green dragon with similarities to the Phillie Phanatic, as the team's official mascot. When Williams staged the "birth" of Stuff at an Orlando event, the man inside Stuff was Dave Raymond.

The Hiroshima Toyo Carp mascot Slyly bears a resemblance to the Phanatic. Both characters were designed by Harrison/Erickson.

On September 24, 2018, the Philadelphia Flyers introduced their new mascot, Gritty, at the Please Touch Museum. On September 28, 2018, Gritty hung out with the Phillie Phanatic at Citizens Bank Park. Since then, the two have been featured on tee shirts, including the one Bryce Harper wore when he arrived at Citizens Bank Park.

== See also ==
- Citizens Bank Park
- List of Major League Baseball mascots
- Mascot Hall of Fame
