= This Is SportsCenter =

Television commercial series

This is SportsCenter was a series of comical television commercials that debuted in 1995 and was run by ESPN to promote their SportsCenter sports news show, based on the show's opening tagline. The ads were presented in a deadpan, mockumentary style, lampooning various aspects of sports, and sports broadcasting.

The New York office of advertising agency Wieden+Kennedy, of Portland, Oregon, wrote and produced the commercials until 2017, with ESPN taking production in-house since 2018. In 2022, ESPN's new creative partner, Arts & Letters, announced that it would revive the campaign in the beginning of 2023. On December 2, 2024, ESPN announced that it would be discontinuing the "This is SportsCenter" campaign after 30 years. The new campaign, entitled "My Life, My Team" will debut on ESPN's family of networks on December 30, 2024.

A few of the ads are available for free on iTunes while many ads are available for viewing through the official ESPN YouTube channel.

== Guest appearances by sports figures ==
A notable feature of the commercials is the seeming ubiquity of famous athletes on the ESPN campus. Some are even depicted doing menial, everyday tasks, usually while wearing their game uniforms. Athletes often have their idiosyncrasies parodied—for example, gymnast Kerri Strug being carried around ESPN headquarters because of her famous ankle injury.

== List of This is SportsCenter spots ==
=== 1994 ===
- In one of the earliest "This is SportsCenter" commercials, Roger Clemens and Cam Neely drive around asking people, to no avail, where they can locate SportsCenter. After a very long search they finally arrive only to find out it has been closed for Chris Berman's birthday.

=== 1995 ===
- In a 1995 commercial Dan Patrick interviews Keith Olbermann, who is performing surgery on Colts quarterback Jim Harbaugh, even though he is still awake; Harbaugh pointedly asks, "Aren't I supposed to be asleep?" just before the surgery appears to go south. Bob Ley suggests this incident may have violated journalistic ethics.
- In a 1995 commercial, WWF wrestlers King Kong Bundy, Shawn Michaels, Kevin Nash, and The Undertaker invade the studio, demanding reasons as to why professional wrestling highlights are not being shown on ESPN.

=== 1996 ===
- In a 1996 commercial, an ESPN producer discusses a fictional trade between SportsCenter and the soap opera Melrose Place, wherein Andrew Shue and Charley Steiner switch jobs; the ad features Shue at the SportsCenter desk discussing a working interview with NFL Commissioner Paul Tagliabue, then cuts to the Melrose Place set where Steiner is cleaning the pool and enthusiastically asks one of the female characters, Sydney Andrews played by actress Laura Leighton, if she wants to rub suntan lotion on his back.
- In a 1996 commercial, Detroit Red Wings legend Gordie Howe is reminiscing with Keith Olbermann and demonstrating stick and body checks while Olbermann is trying to work.
- Olympic gymnast Kerri Strug was featured in two commercials. In the first, she is carried around the ESPN offices, being handed off from person to person, finally being carried off by Michigan State mascot Sparty. In the second, Strug is talking incessantly while still being carried around, and no one is interested in holding her anymore.
- Former U.S. Senator and basketball player with the Princeton Tigers, New York Knicks, and the U.S. Olympic Team Bill Bradley is interviewed for a job by Keith Olbermann and Bob Ley, who skeptically question his qualifications to work at SportsCenter.

=== 1997 ===
- In a 1997 commercial Kenny Mayne and Stuart Scott run a training camp for rookies to teach them about having (what turns out to be) an arrogant attitude, yelling at a young Kobe Bryant and Keyshawn Johnson to yell out "I'm the man." Both turn in poor efforts.

=== 1998 ===
- In a 1998 commercial, Lou Duva and a crew of assistants come to Rich Eisen's aid during a commercial break as Eisen appears punch-drunk and fatigued; Duva hydrates Eisen with tea and gives him an aggressive pep talk. As the break ends, Eisen resumes the telecast as normal.

=== 1999 ===
- In a 1999 commercial aired in the midst of the Y2K fears, when the studio's electricity goes out (due to Y2K tests), amidst the ensuing mayhem – which includes Mark McGwire smashing a computer with his bat – Charley Steiner walks away, wearing face paint and a necktie as a headband, holding a lantern and screaming, “Follow me! Follow me to freedom!”
- In the SportsCenter studios, Rich Eisen is chatting with Bobby Labonte about his hair, when Labonte notices someone doing donuts in his #18 Interstate Batteries Pontiac in the parking lot. Labonte runs down to the lot to find the Georgetown Hoyas mascot, Jack the Bulldog, driving the car and screams at him. Eisen then pays off the mascot for the prank.

=== 2000 ===
- At the ESPN offices, Stuart Scott bumps into Tiger Woods, who asks if they're still on for lunch; Scott tells Tiger to meet him in the lobby at 12:30. Tiger walks away then followed by the huge crowd which usually follows him at any golf tournament he plays at. A shorter version of this ad sees Woods decline an invitation to sponsor Scott in a race, minus the crowd.
- The power goes out late at night at the ESPN studios; Dan Patrick goes backstage to find the cause of the power outage: apparently Lance Armstrong has taken a break from riding his bicycle connected to a generator.

=== 2002 ===
- A 2002 ad shows Dan Patrick and Stone Cold Steve Austin in the break room late at night, with Austin studying and being unable to stay awake. Patrick helps to wake Austin up with a chair shot to the back. Austin asks for one more, which Patrick obliges to do, and Austin thanks him and resumes his studying.

=== 2005 ===
- A 2005 ad included Pittsburgh Steelers quarterback Ben Roethlisberger saving people from the ESPN building while the fire alarm is ringing. Stuart Scott is talking outside the building with Scott Van Pelt asking "Does he know this is a drill?"

=== 2006 ===
- In 2006, a commercial aired which showed Danica Patrick's race car being towed from a parking spot, presumably outside SportsCenter studios, which was reserved for "D. Patrick". Danica runs outside after her car, only to run into Dan Patrick, one of SportsCenter's anchors. Some humorous debate over whose parking spot it really was follows.
- A 2006 ad features the Manning family taking a tour of the SportsCenter studio. John Anderson conducts the tour while brothers Eli and Peyton Manning engage in horseplay behind their parents and older brother's back. When their father, Archie, turns to look, the brothers stop and proceed to silently blame each other for the antics.
- Another 2006 ad features Chicago White Sox manager Ozzie Guillén trying to call to the bullpen during a game, but instead reaches Neil Everett at ESPN.
- Chad Johnson of the Cincinnati Bengals has a meeting with Stuart Scott, Steve Levy, and John Anderson to get ideas for his next touchdown celebration. While Scott's "old school" is rejected (Johnson responds to his trademark Boo-yah with "Boo-no"), as well as Levy's "sizzling bacon action" idea (Johnson: "If I did that in public I'd fine myself"), Anderson's idea of making the football disappear like a magician is met with approval. Johnson wraps the ad by asking, "Can I get a puff of smoke with that?," with Anderson agreeing.
- The hot-dog eating champion Takeru Kobayashi was featured in an ad where he finishes his lunch in the ESPN cafeteria in the 30-second span of the commercial.

=== 2007 ===
- A 2007 ad featuring Minnesota Twins catcher Joe Mauer and Scott Van Pelt having a conversation about Minnesota in the cafeteria.
- A 2007 ad featuring Boston Red Sox designated hitter David Ortiz is introduced to members of anchor John Buccigross's family. He greets each one by spitting into each of his batting gloves, slapping them together, and shaking the family member's hand, similar to his typical batting ritual.
- Another 2007 ad featuring David Ortiz shows Ortiz, anchor Stan Verrett, and Jorge Posada of the New York Yankees sitting at a conference table. The three are talking about hats, and how as a catcher Posada never wears his. Ortiz asks to see the Yankee's hat to bend the brim and break it in. As Ortiz puts it on his own head, Red Sox mascot Wally the Green Monster walks by, sees Ortiz in the Yankees hat, drops the video tapes he's carrying and is mortified, refusing to have anything to do with Ortiz, even though Ortiz pleads, "it's not what you think!"
- A 2007 ad features Cleveland Cavaliers player LeBron James arriving at ESPN offices and sitting in his cubicle in a standard office chair. He realizes something is wrong so he goes to Scott Van Pelt's neighboring cubicle and Van Pelt is sitting in a throne, (which he took from "King James" cubicle). Getting Lebron to ask, "Scott, did you possibly switch chairs with me?" Scott in the commercial said no, but after James' performance in Game 6 of the Eastern Conference Finals, Van Pelt during the SportsCenter he was on said, "LeBron, I really did take your chair."
- Another ad featuring James shows him struggling to fix an apparent paper jam in a copier. Stuart Scott walks by the room, sees James having trouble with such a menial task and says in a sarcastic tone "The chosen one, huh?"
- A 2007 ad features Yankees catcher Jorge Posada acknowledging cheers of "Hip, Hip, Jorge!" as he walks down the hall.
- A 2007 ad features Shaquille O'Neal dressed as a cop as he rescues Mike the Tiger from a tree (Shaq attended LSU). At the end Shaq asks Mike if he's all right and is handed a Vitaminwater for his efforts.
- A 2007 ad features Indianapolis Colts placekicker Adam Vinatieri passing through a metal detector multiple times, each time forgetting to remove one of his four Super Bowl rings from his person. Former Buffalo Bills quarterback Jim Kelly is seen in line behind Vinatieri, clearly frustrated with the delay. (Kelly never won a Super Bowl with the Bills, losing four straight in the early 1990s)
- A 2007 ad has Scott Van Pelt walking down the hallway only to discover Tony Romo having a party complete with the Dallas Cowboys Cheerleaders. Another ad features Romo answering phones at ESPN. He gives anchor Stan Verrett his messages, reading them off his armband, similar to how NFL quarterbacks have their playbook written on their arms during games.
- A 2007 ad features the Boston Celtics' new Big Three of Ray Allen, Kevin Garnett, and Paul Pierce asking anchor Scott Van Pelt for advice on selecting nicknames. (The name Van Pelt coined, the "Boston Three-Party", has actually been used in ESPN broadcasts.) A follow-up spot has Steve Levy heckle the trio as they walk through the SportsCenter offices in their Celtic uniforms. Levy shouts, "Hey fellas, did you call each other last night and talk about what you're gonna wear today?"
- A 2007 ad has LaDainian Tomlinson sorting mail in the mailroom in his jersey and his helmet. Steve Levy then comes to get his mail, and proceeds to tell LT that the mail is not his (LT wears a black visor, which in this case is supposed to be detrimental to his vision). A follow-up ad has LT playing a hand-held video game with Chris McKendry.
- A 2007 ad has Richard Simmons hired as SportsCenter's "conditioning coach".
- A 2007 ad sees Chris McKendry and Stan Verrett stuck in bumper to bumper traffic trying to enter the Bristol campus because a Mardi Gras float driven by Drew Brees cannot fit through the narrow entrance gate.

=== 2008 ===
- Two WWE wrestlers have appeared in the show's commercials. In 2008, WWE wrestlers John Cena and anchor Jay Harris have a conversation on why SportsCenter never airs pro wrestling highlights. Towards the end of the commercial, Harris believes that pro wrestling is not a real sport but Cena disagrees.
- A 2008 ad has Chris Chelios and anchor John Buccigross having a conversation about forty-something athletes in the studio hallway.
- A 2008 ad has ESPN employees being locked out of the studio as Dirk Nowitzki cannot seem to get the door open.
- A 2008 ad features Brian Kenny poking fun at NASCAR driver Matt Kenseth in the cafeteria simply because stock car racing has its roots in the southern United States (Kenseth is from Wisconsin).
- A 2008 ad has author Stephen King helping out with John Anderson's script.
- A 2008 ad features anchors Kenny Mayne and John Buccigross poking fun at University of Tennessee women's basketball coach Pat Summitt in the offices.
- A 2008 ad features anchor John Anderson recording a promo on ESPN's football demonstration field. However, he is interrupted by players from the Chicago Rush, who have scheduled the field for practice. A follow-up spot features Anderson having a group therapy session with the Chicago Rush.
- A 2008 ad has LSU football coach Les Miles giving a potential anchor a tour of the studio as if he was recruiting a high school player for a college team.
- A 2008 ad features Carolina Panthers wide receiver Steve Smith displaying his "incendiary" speed to anchor Kenny Mayne. A follow-up ad has Steve Smith getting his ankle checked by Brian Kenny.
- In a 2008 ad, Steve Levy and Jay Harris observe Manny Ramirez eating a snack in the break room, seemingly amazed by Ramirez's actions. Manny then picks up his cell phone and says, "Hola?", prompting Harris and Levy to burst out in laughter and marvel at "Manny being Manny!" This ad was never shown as part of a normal commercial cycle, as it did not come out before Ramirez was traded from the Boston Red Sox to the Los Angeles Dodgers; ESPN instead showed it during a broadcast of SportsCenter on the night Ramirez was traded, with anchors John Buccigross and John Anderson providing "commentary" on Levy's performance.
- A 2008 ad shows Michael Phelps, apparently fresh from a race, as he is soaking wet while in cap and suit, asking to use Stuart Scott's computer – which promptly shorts out as Phelps drips water all over the console. A confused Phelps asks, "What is it with the computers in here?" A second spot shows Phelps at his cubicle, which is next to Jay Harris; Phelps notices Harris has taken one of his Olympic medals and is using it as a coaster for his cup. He promptly restores it to his own shelf. A disappointed Harris can be heard muttering, "It's just a bronze."

=== 2009 ===
- A 2009 ad features anchor John Buccigross asking Albert Pujols to run some errands only to discover that Pujols is wearing a cockeyed shirt. Another ad featuring Pujols shows him at the photocopier when he is approached by John Anderson and Steve Levy. The anchors refer to Pujols by his nickname "The Machine." The scene is then shown through Pujols' eyes, his vision similar to a science fiction robot, scanning the room and displaying possible responses, one of which is to "eliminate" the anchors. He instead simply responds "Guys, I'm not a machine. I'm just Albert." The anchors walk away, dejected, and the copy machine speaks to Pujols, asking why he did not eliminate them, with Pujols telling the copy machine to shut up.
- A 2009 commercial features anchor Scott Van Pelt and Philadelphia Phillies shortstop Jimmy Rollins reviewing Van Pelt's videos in front of the camera. In the commercial, it is implied that just like baseball players, anchors also go through slumps, and like them, they also study their tapes to discover their flaws. In the commercial, a confused Van Pelt looks to Rollins for guidance in his "poor performances" which include talking to the camera with his head down on his desk, spinning on his chair, randomly flapping his arm, and elevating his head above the camera. The commercial ends with the phrase "The great ones always figure it out" with Jimmy Rollins clearly frustrated at Van Pelt's videos.
- In one ad Neil Everett is discussing with Roger Federer where Everett would rank in the top 10 of SportsCenter anchors if there were such a thing. Federer states, "I'm not sure you'd be in the top ten."
- Arizona Cardinals wide receiver Larry Fitzgerald appears in two spots: one has him asking anchor John Buccigross for his I.D., and the second has him walking around the SportsCenter office trying to convince anchor Jay Harris his haircut looks fine while catching falling objects before they hit the ground.
- A 2009 ad has Kasey Kahne offering anchor John Anderson a ride in his #9 Budweiser Dodge.
- A 2009 ad features Atlanta Falcons quarterback Matt Ryan tossing yogurt to anchors Hannah Storm and Josh Elliott. A follow-up has Josh Elliott asking Matt Ryan for his password, which consists of a complicated string of words and numbers, similar to the play calls in the NFL.

=== 2010 ===
- A 2010 ad has Olympic speed skater Apolo Anton Ohno delivering the highlights—on roller skates.
- Orlando Magic center Dwight Howard appears in two spots: one has him dribbling a basketball while sitting at his cubicle before encountering anchor Dari Nowkhah. A second and more recent spot has Howard entering the office shortly after Hannah Storm accidentally set the coffee machine on fire, dressed in reporter's garb and asking her what happened. She tells him that Superman had come in and put the fire out, and he says that she was lucky Superman was there (but never reveals his secret identity).
- A 2010 ad features Phoenix Suns guard Steve Nash and anchor Scott Van Pelt poking fun at Canadian culture.
- Another 2010 ad featuring Wayne Gretzky plays off of his time as an NHL head coach, where he runs SportsCenter like a hockey practice. Chris McKendry and John Buccigross are replaced in a "line change" with Jay Harris and Brian Kenny, then are sent back when Gretzky does not like what he sees. Before he sends Harris and Kenny back out, Gretzky gives both of them a pep talk and reminds Kenny to make sure his S's are crisp.
- A 2010 ad features Los Angeles Angels outfielder Torii Hunter shredding some papers while anchor Jay Harris mocks him, saying "Now that's what I call, a diamond in the rough."
- A 2010 ad features San Francisco Giants pitcher Tim Lincecum attempting to record an outgoing voicemail message on his phone, telling callers that they have reached "the Freak," "the Franchise," "the Freaky Franchise" and "Big Time Timmy Jim" but being dissatisfied with all. Finally he decides to record one beginning simply "this is Tim Lincecum" only to be interrupted by Karl Ravech walking by and saying "Hey, Big Time Timmy Jim!" A follow-up ad features Lincecum dunking the UMass mascot in the dunk tank.
- A 2010 ad features Landon Donovan translating an email in French that Chris McKendry got. It says "Bonne Journee". Translation: Have a nice day! A follow-up ad shows Donovan attempting to make a photocopy. When the machine does not work, Donovan kicks it, only to have a yellow card spit out. When he protests the yellow card a red card is then dispensed.
- A 2010 ad features Andre Ethier and anchor Stan Verrett talking about a new 3D camera ESPN has. Verrett claims it is more expensive than a spaceship. Verrett has a baseball bat and starts swinging it in front of the camera to show Ethier how it looks. Ethier then says "Let me see a real swing." Verret swings and breaks the camera. Ethier asks if they are going to be in trouble, and Verrett says yes.
- A 2010 ad features various anchors standing in line to use the men's restroom when it is closed for repairs. Wes Welker is the repairman. However, anchor John Buccigross gets impatient and uses the ladies' room.

=== 2011 ===
- A 2011 ad features Alexander Ovechkin looking through files. Steve Levy sees him and jokingly calls him a Russian spy. Levy then leaves, then the roof opens and Ovechkin is pulled up by Capitals goaltender (and fellow Russian) Semyon Varlamov. A follow-up ad features Ovechkin helping Chris McKendry putting up a note on the bulletin board.
- A 2011 ad features Kevin Durant serving himself a huge helping of lasagna in the cafeteria. SportsCenter anchor Jay Harris says "That's a lot of lasagna you have here, Kevin". Durant responds, "Who, me?"
- A 2011 ad features Steve Levy looking at the financial records and asks Brian Wilson if he had anything to do with the report.
- A 2011 ad features Ichiro Suzuki having trouble getting around the studio because of his difficulty with the English language until anchor John Anderson finds another way to help out.

=== 2012 ===
- A 2012 ad features Kentucky Wildcats men's basketball coach John Calipari help out with the anchor recruiting process.
- A 2012 ad features John Clayton after delivering his football insight on a SportsCenter segment, then after that segment ends, it is revealed that Clayton does the broadcast from his bedroom in his parents house, wearing a fake suit with a hidden ponytail and hops on his bed to eat old Chinese food and listen to heavy metal.
- Detroit Lions quarterback Matthew Stafford stars in two 15-second spots. In one spot, Stafford finds some stale Chinese food in the refrigerator and throws it in the trash only for the Georgia Bulldogs mascot to pull it out of the garbage. In the other, the mascot spills water but is being scolded by Stafford, who believes he's used the bathroom on the carpet.
- A 2012 ad features golfer Arnold Palmer making an Arnold Palmer (a drink of iced tea and lemonade) in the ESPN cafeteria, as Stuart Scott and Scott Van Pelt look on.

=== 2013 ===
- A 2013 ad features Baldwin the Eagle and Hooter the Owl, the mascots of Boston College and Temple respectively, crashing into a window repeatedly while several anchors look on.
- A 2013 ad features Hannah Storm telling viewers that SportsCenter anchors write their own material, but when a Harvard graduate goes in their office, the anchors ask for his help in writing. The scene cuts to Jeremy Lin assisting Jay Crawford in writing his material, using jargons like "trajectory matrix", "terminal velocity", "temporal matrix" in describing basketball terminologies. In the end, Lin tells Crawford, "You misspelled temporal".
- A 2013 ad features CC Sabathia and Steve Levy discussing the slimming nature of pinstripes, when Scott Van Pelt walks in wearing a new suit with horizontal stripes, which exposes him as being much bigger than expected. A follow-up ad features anchors John Anderson and Jay Harris eating lunch at the cafeteria when they mock Sabathia after Sabathia came to the table with a bunch of hamburgers.
- A 2013 spot features John Anderson asking Rickie Fowler if he is colorblind when he pours orange juice into his coffee.
- A 2013 ad features anchor Robert Flores saying that SportsCenter hired a "world-renowned chef", but laments that only Henrik Lundqvist seems to understand him. The scene cuts to the cafeteria, where The Swedish Chef is telling anchor Steve Levy the menu for lunch. Confused with the chef's "Swedish", he asks Lundqvist for translation. In the end, the Swedish Chef gets annoyed when Linda Cohn asks for a hamburger. A follow-up ad has Lundqvist showing up for "Casual Friday."
- A 2013 ad features the Denver Broncos mascot Miles and the Indianapolis Colts mascot Blue getting into a scuffle with Jay Harris playing peacemaker.
- A 2013 ad features Calvin Johnson of the Detroit Lions talking to Stuart Scott in the ESPN offices. Calvin hears a supervisor coming, and stating "I was never here..." transforms into a vending machine, a play on Calvin's real world nickname "Megatron". The supervisor asks Stuart if he has seen Calvin, which Stuart denies. When the coast is clear, Calvin transforms back into his normal form and thanks a clearly befuddled Stuart. A follow-up ad has Johnson giving Lindsey Czarniak a lift to the book shelf.

=== 2014 ===
- A 2014 ad features Pittsburgh Pirates outfielder Andrew McCutchen and several pirate-themed mascots (which includes the Pirate Parrot) invade a typical SportsCenter meeting. A follow-up ad features McCutchen making bubble gum in the breakroom while Adnan Virk looks on.
- A 2014 ad featured Bubba Watson and his caddy "playing through" an obstacle in the office, the Stanford Tree. A follow-up ad has Watson sharpening pencils all the way down to the size of golf pencils.
- A 2014 ad features a kid holding hands with United States midfielder Michael Bradley where the kid helps Bradley with carrying papers and holding his cup of coffee while he is in the bathroom.
- A 2014 ad features the rock group Metallica being out of work after Mariano Rivera retired since Rivera's entrance song is Enter Sandman.
- A 2014 ad features New York Giants wide receiver Victor Cruz and New Orleans Saints tight end Jimmy Graham along with NFL cheerleaders and mascots at a fantasy SportsCenter draft where they choose from among the show's anchors for their fantasy teams.
- Graham also stars in a second spot where he attempts to throw paper balls in a waste basket but accidentally hits anchor Sage Steele instead.
- A 2014 ad features Jay Harris with the University of Wisconsin offensive line, where they are unable to use "the big room" for their meeting, which is being used by two horse jockeys and a gymnast, causing Jay to use a much smaller room instead. (The joke being that Wisconsin is known for having very big offensive linemen)

=== 2015 ===
- A 2015 ad features the dancing sharks from Katy Perry's Super Bowl XLIX halftime show who are revealed to be John Anderson and Bram Weinstein.
- A 2015 ad featured bowler Pete Weber calling it a day by trading in his bowling shoes.
- A 2015 ad features anchors John Anderson and Bram Weinstein having a meeting with the GoodYear Blimp pilot about scheduling a flight while the Stanford Tree is hanging from the blimp.
- A 2015 ad features anchor Scott Van Pelt having a conference call while various mascots look on.
- A 2015 ad features boxer Manny Pacquiao taking a sip from a bottle of milk, only to spit it out when he found out that the milk expired.
- A 2015 ad features anchors John Buccigross and Kevin Negandhi playing around with various sports trophies much to anchor Hannah Storm's dismay.
- A 2015 ad has tennis player Novak Djokovic working as a cafeteria cashier of whom anchor Jay Crawford complains to by having to pay his hamburger, french fries and soda separately instead of getting a discount.
- A 2015 ad features Yasiel Puig bringing his walkup music to the ESPN Offices.
- A 2015 ad features Rob Gronkowski showing off his Super Bowl ring to anchors Neil Everett, Stan Verrett and Kenny Mayne. A follow-up ad features Gronkowski having trouble getting a snack from the vending machine while Everett mocks him.
- A 2015 ad features Ohio State Buckeyes football coach Urban Meyer handing out game balls to anchors Jay Crawford and Chris McKendry following the show.
- A 2015 ad features various anchors (including John Anderson and Lindsay Czarniak) having breakfast while the Kentucky Wildcats mascot and Arizona's Wilbur Wildcat get into a catfight.
- A 2015 ad features the SportsCenter crew honoring the longtime sports tradition of playing the national anthem before sporting events, in this case playing The Star-Spangled Banner before the start of SportsCenter. Just as the crew is getting ready to sit down, the Canadian national anthem O Canada starts playing, showing that the episode has Barry Melrose talking about hockey. As John Anderson is surprised to hear Melrose's appearance on the episode, this also pokes fun at ESPN's general lack of NHL coverage compared to other sports at that point.
- A 2015 ad features Neil Everett and Stan Verrett in line at the cafeteria with NBA star Stephen Curry. It just so happens that Chicken Curry is the special the day after Stephen has a big night. He promptly thanks the workers for making the Chicken Curry for him despite the fact the workers do not know who he is.
- A 2015 ad features NBA players Damian Lillard and Jeff Teague selecting anchors for their "SportsCenter All-Star Team."
- A 2015 ad features Houston Texans defensive lineman J. J. Watt taking his bodyguard instincts a bit too much.
- A 2015 ad features New York Mets pitcher Matt Harvey eating ice cream from a regular sized batting helmet while anchors Jay Harris and Lisa Kerney look on.
- A 2015 ad features UFC fighter Ronda Rousey getting ready for her upcoming match inside the conference room as she is battling a dummy which has anchor Linda Cohn's photo on it but Cohn does not seem to notice it.
- A 2015 ad features anchors Scott Van Pelt and Steve Levy along with bull riders J.W. Harris and Sage Kimzey recreating the Western-style campfire cookout made famous in classic Western films.
- A 2015 ad features Mike Krzyzewski communicating with Justise Winslow through a translator, with Krzyzewski communicating in English and Winslow in emoji.

=== 2016 ===
- A 2016 ad featured Carolina Panthers linebacker Luke Kuechly putting on an Iron Man mask in order to fool anchor Lindsay Czarniak.
- A 2016 ad featured the Los Angeles Laker Girls performing the "Harlem Shake" during "halftime" of a typical SportsCenter taping which spoofs halftime shows of football and basketball games.
- A 2016 spot features PGA golfer Jordan Spieth and his caddy discussing on whether to use a spoon or fork for Jordan's macaroni and cheese. They decide to use a spoon and anchor Stan Verrett does the same.
- A 2016 ad stars anchors Neil Everett and Stan Verrett as they are getting ready to do SportsCenter but Sir Purr and Miles have taken their seats. In a follow-up ad, Sir Purr tries to put a Broncos helmet on but his head is too big as he is mocked by anchor Kenny Mayne.
- A 2016 spot features anchor Jonathan Coachman getting the axe in a spot which spoofs coaching and managerial firings.
- A 2016 spot features Chicago White Sox mascot Southpaw watching a video on YouTube when anchor Kevin Negandhi asks him on when the report on athlete salaries was finished.
- A 2016 ad features jockey Victor Espinoza livid after he finds out that anchor Kevin Connors has taken his Triple Crown trophy.
- A 2016 ad features anchor John Anderson holding a news conference. The problem is that the conference room features a bunch of MLB mascots which includes Wally the Green Monster and the Philly Phanatic.
- A 2016 ad features Phoenix Mercury center Brittney Griner and anchor Stan Verrett debating the NBA vs. the WNBA.
- A 2016 ad features a curious fan watching tennis player Caroline Wozniacki's every single move but anchor David Lloyd saves her.
- A 2016 ad features numerous ESPN employees (including anchors Neil Everett and Cari Champion) being locked out of the ESPN's Los Angeles studios while Pittsburgh Steelers wide receiver Antonio Brown tries to fix the computer system. Another ad features Brown working the reception area much to Everett's dismay.
- A 2016 ad features swimmer Ryan Lochte being a victim of a practical joke allegedly performed by Miami Marlins mascot Billy the Marlin. Billy presumably put tuna fish all over Lochte's computer keyboard as a result.
- A 2016 ad pokes fun at baseball's "Throwback Day" as ESPN goes back to 1979 with its set and anchor fashions.
- A 2016 ad features Alabama football coach Nick Saban giving the SportsCenter crew (including anchors Jay Harris and John Buccigross) a pep talk before showtime.
- A 2016 ad features NASCAR Sprint Cup driver Carl Edwards cheering up a dejected John Anderson by performing his signature backflip, not once but twice.
- A 2016 ad features Pittsburgh Penguins center Sidney Crosby giving high-fives to anchors Jonathan Coachman, Jay Harris, David Lloyd and Sara Walsh as well as Penguins mascot Iceburgh.
- In a 2016 ad, ESPN celebrates "Foreign Exchange Week" as sports anchors from Australia, England, Japan and Mexico mingle with anchors John Anderson, John Buccigross, Jay Crawford and Jay Harris.
- In a 2016 ad, anchor Jay Harris gives Chicago Cubs mascot Clark the Cub a plush version of Murphy the goat in an effort to end the Cubs' 108-year World Series drought (Murphy was the name of the goat that Billy Sianis brought during Game 4 of the 1945 World Series).
- A 2016 ad features Golden State Warriors star Draymond Green becoming a victim of a practical joke played by anchors John Buccigross and Steve Levy.
- A 2016 ad features anchors Jay Harris and Kevin Negandhi decorating Chicago Cubs manager Joe Maddon and Cleveland Indians manager Terry Francona's cubicles while the managers get ready for the World Series.
- A 2016 ad featured Jay Harris erasing the 108-year World Series drought for the Chicago Cubs followed by UConn mascot Jonathan the Husky erasing 35 days "since the last workplace incident."

=== 2017 ===
- A 2017 ad features New Orleans Pelicans forward Anthony Davis blocking John Anderson's computer.
- A 2017 ad features Golden state Warriors forward Draymond Green and anchors John Buccigross and Steve Levy wearing unique outfits to work.
- A 2017 ad features Texas Longhorns mascot Hook Em being used as a coat hanger in the ESPN lobby.
- A 2017 ad features Chicago Cubs third baseman Kris Bryant mowing the yard at ESPN's Los Angeles campus while encountering anchor Stan Verrett.
- A 2017 ad features Cleveland Indians pitcher Andrew Miller getting a bunch of food (including fried chicken) for lunch before joining a very curious Jade McCarthy at the table.
- A 2017 ad features tennis player Andy Murray influencing ESPN employees to wear "short shorts" at work.
- A 2017 ad features UConn women's basketball coach Geno Auriemma being questioned by anchors Kevin Negandhi and Hannah Storm regarding his near-perfect coaching record.
- A 2017 ad features anchor Steve Levy trying to read Dallas Cowboys quarterback Dak Prescott's online diary but is stopped by Prescott.
- A 2017 ad features hot dog eating champion Joey Chesnutt showing off his talents in the cafeteria next to anchor Scott Van Pelt.
- A 2017 features Seattle Mariners mascot the Mariner Moose changing the office radio's dial.
- A 2017 ad features Boston Red Sox mascot Wally the Green Monster working as ESPN's meteorologist before being replaced by Seattle Mariners mascot the Mariner Moose.
- In a 2017 ad, a typical SportsCenter taping anchored by Michael Smith and Jemele Hill gets interrupted by a power outage.
- Golfer Rory McIlroy stars in two 2017 spots in which he co-starred with anchor Jay Harris. In the 30-second spot, McIlroy receives the Scripps National Spelling Bee Championship trophy and in the 15-second spot, the Vince Lombardi Trophy and the NASCAR Cup Series Championship trophy.

=== 2018 ===
- A 2018 ad featured Denver Broncos linebacker Von Miller feeding the San Diego Chicken some birdseed for lunch.
- A 2018 ad has Stephen A. Smith (Phil Murphy in the non-US version) and Neil Everett trying to make Greek-born Milwaukee Bucks basketball player Giannis Antetokounmpo feel welcome by smashing plates, shouting "Opa!" Giannis tells them that "nobody actually does that in Greece."

=== 2019 ===
- A 2019 ad featured Kansas City Chiefs quarterback Patrick Mahomes and several mascots crashing an ESPN employee potluck dinner.
- A 2019 ad features female pro wrestler Becky Lynch ordering coffee. When the barista asks, "Name?", Lynch, believing the barista should already know it, angrily gives a list of her accomplishments and her nickname ("The Man"), until the barista tells her he just needed her name to write down on her cup for her order. A second ad has Lynch walking down a hallway, giving a shove to the Rutgers Scarlet Knight as he walks by, much to the Knight's confusion. A third ad sees Lynch walking by a malfunctioned candy bar vending machine, where she initially raises her fist to seemingly punch the machine open, only to call for the Facilities Department for assistance instead. The ads began airing shortly after Lynch won the WWE Raw Women's Championship and WWE SmackDown Women's Championship after defeating Ronda Rousey and Charlotte Flair in the main event of WrestleMania 35.

=== 2023 ===
- A 2023 ad features Georgia Bulldogs football coach Kirby Smart designing plays for the SportsCenter crew (including anchors Linda Cohn and Stan Verrett) by giving them a pre-show speech in a parody of football coaches designing plays for their offense and defense.
- A 2023 ad featuring numerous anchors having a tough time breaking the pinata until Jose Altuve shows up.
- A 2023 ad features United States Women's National Soccer Team members Megan Rapinoe, Becky Sauerbrunn and Sophia Smith eating orange slices alongside anchor Nicole Briscoe while Syracuse Orange mascot Otto the Orange looks on.
  - An additional ad features Rapinoe, Sauerbrunn, and Smith with other ESPN staff in a boring meeting and prepare to leave when the clock strikes noon, only for a soccer official to signal for 9 more minutes of stoppage time.
- A 2023 ad features track and field athlete Sydney McLaughlin catching San Francisco 49ers mascot Sourdough Sam wearing her gold medal. She also stars in a 15-second spot where anchor Hannah Storm questions her speed.
- A 2023 ad features Houston Astros mascot Orbit riding on the escalator while encountering anchor Kevin Negandhi along the way.
- A 2023 ad features Tyson Fury fixing anchor Steve Levy's computer after it suffered a virus.
- A 2023 ad features anchor Matt Barrie being "fired" by Norby Williamson in a parody of coaches and managers getting fired for their teams' performance only to be "rehired" later.
- A 2023 ad features anchor John Buccigross poking fun at Boston Celtics forward Jayson Tatum's cubicle which happens to be colored green (including the chair).
- A 2023 ad features Vegas Golden Knights players Jonathan Marchessault and Jack Eichel in a "penalty cubicle" and get joined by Steve Levy, who got sent for "'Replied all' to a company-wide email." A second ad features Marchessault and Eichel washing the Stanley Cup in the breakroom's dishwasher.

=== 2024 ===
- A 2024 ad features golfer Jon Rahm telling the cafeteria cashier that he and his caddy get a seat in the back much to anchors John Buccigross and Kevin Connors' dismay. Rahm also appears in another spot where he and Steve Levy encounter Florida Gators mascot Albert in the break room; there is also a Spanish version of the latter ad in which Rahm discusses with Mexican anchor John Sutcliffe how to play a ball near Albert the Gator before coming to the agreement that Rahm should take a drop.
- A 2024 ad features Houston Astros shortstop Jeremy Pena being late for his meeting.
- A 2024 ad features Indiana Fever center Aliyah Boston, Las Vegas Aces center A'ja Wilson and Texas Rangers mascot the Rangers Captain dribbling in the lobby when they invite anchor Kevin Negandhi to play with them.
- A 2024 ad features swimmer Katie Ledecky and anchor Nicole Briscoe about to get some lunch in the cafeteria when they see that Miami Marlins mascot Billy the Marlin is guarding the buffet area. Ledecky also appears in another spot where she and anchor Kevin Connors are in the storage room looking for Ledecky's lost swim goggles.
- A 2024 spot features gymnast Simone Biles giving anchor Jay Harris some motivation tips on the set.
- A 2024 spot features Miami Dolphins quarterback Tua Tagovailoa, Miami Dolphins mascot T.D., Miami Marlins mascot Billy the Marlin, Vancouver Canucks mascot Fin and San Jose Sharks mascot S.J. Sharkie invading a typical SportsCenter preshow meeting that Norby Williamson is conducting which also includes anchors Kevin Connors, Molly Qerim, Sage Steele and Gary Striewski. After Tagovailoa and the mascots take the water bottles, Striewski asks Connors, "What are we gonna do for water?" Connors responds, "The drinking fountain after the meeting, I guess."
- A 2024 ad features South Carolina Gamecocks women's basketball coach Dawn Staley and anchor Jay Harris having a conversation about the differences between men's basketball and women's basketball. Staley then manages to slap Harris on the backside as Harris groans, "Oh, women."
- A 2024 ad features anchors Jay Harris and David Lloyd checking out Los Angeles Dodgers manager Dave Roberts and New York Yankees manager Aaron Boone's empty cubicles while the managers are in Los Angeles for the World Series. Harris then picks up a seemingly innocent baseball but is doused with chocolate syrup coming out of the baseball, embarrassing himself in the process.

== Sports practices ==
Many commercials in the series have derived their humor from parodying conventional professional sports practices, by applying them to working for SportsCenter:

- A spot from the early 2000s had Michelle Kwan sitting on a couch just off-set with Dan Patrick and Rich Eisen seeing their ratings, and finding out they're not popular in Texas. The ad was a parody of figure skaters receiving their scores from the kiss and cry area.
- One ad has former anchor Rich Eisen being "sent down to the minors" (in his case, working for a high-school TV service, where two students asked him to buy them some beer, a request he declined to honor).
- San Diego Padres closer Trevor Hoffman replaces anchor Kenny Mayne for the show's "Did You Know?" segment, similar to relieving the starting pitcher in a baseball game.
- The network drafting a "can't-miss" anchor prospect out of high school, only to see him flame out on the job ("Jimmy Key, what is he 45? I could hit him!") and ESPN discovering that "he just came out too soon", alluding to how some basketball players leave school early and "flame out".
- John Buccigross wearing the "anchor-cam", a parody of MLB catchers wearing a "catcher-cam" during ESPN and FOX's MLB telecasts.
- Charley Steiner being "traded" to Melrose Place in exchange for Andrew Shue.
- One rather infamous spot is the making of the SportsCenter swimsuit calendar, featuring Bill Pidto, Stuart Scott and Linda Cohn in various states of revealing swimwear.
- One ad featured Stuart Scott recalling various anchors' "Perfect Shows" ("Bob Ley had his in '89, Steiner in '91"), and how Dan Patrick "had one going last season". It then cuts to the set to show the various crew members and co-anchor Kenny Mayne refusing to speak or even make eye-contact with Patrick during commercial breaks, similar to how in baseball it is considered bad luck to talk in the dugout to a pitcher who takes a no-hitter or perfect game into the late innings. Patrick ultimately slips up though, declaring on air "That of course is the kind of thing that can't never happen in a playoff race", and he is crushed as an "umpire" in the control booth declares he has used a double negative. Scott wraps up the spot by saying "In the end, he just let it get away from him."
- A parody of post-game interviewing finds a dejected Kenny Mayne and an upbeat Dan Patrick asked about their performances in that evening's broadcast in "locker room" interviews.
- The carpet in the ESPN headquarters is replaced with grass to prevent injuries, a parody of the controversy over injuries sustained by football players competing on AstroTurf (in the ad, ESPN workers are shown tripping on the carpet). The anchors have to yell over the sound of the lawn mower cutting the grass in the studio.
- One spot from the mid-90s had SportsCenter being 'relocated', lampooning the trend of team owners threatening city (and in some cases state) governments with team relocation to get what they want. In the ad, Hair Club for Men founder Sy Sperling is depicted as the owner of SportsCenter, announcing at a press conference he is relocating to "the city of the future - Bristol, CT." He raves about free parking, more luxury boxes, and the availability of high-quality fruits and vegetables. Sperling wraps up the ad by saying, "I'd have loved to stay in California, but those bastards in Sacramento low-balled me", seeming to spoof the recent departure of both the Raiders and Rams from Los Angeles, both because of their unsatisfactory stadiums. In reality, SportsCenter was always based in Bristol since the show's inception in 1979.
- In a 1997 ad, Dan Patrick and Kenny Mayne are shown signing off a typical SportsCenter broadcast, and are then given sombreros, and they begin broadcasting the Spanish version of SportsCenter (with a mariachi version of the show's theme). While Bob Ley explains that they redo the show for overseas markets ("Same highlights, same anchors, different dialects"), they are also shown giving Russian and German versions a try, replete with national costumes, and the SportsCenter theme redone for those cultures.
- In a recent ad, Scott Van Pelt asks spelling bee champion David Tidmarsh to help him by spelling "Pujols". In true spelling bee tradition, Tidmarsh asks for the team (St. Louis Cardinals), country of origin (Dominican Republic), and for the word to be used in a sentence ("Pujols homered to win the game."), then slowly spells the word while Van Pelt cuts him off, saying "I found it online, got it."
- A 2005 ad begins with John Anderson commenting that Scott Van Pelt had been on a run of unbelievable shows, accompanied by footage of Van Pelt using numerous "big-syllable" words ("A-Rod exhibits inordinate aptitude in spheroidical aviation!"); Anderson then sadly reveals that Scott had been using "performance enhancers", showing Van Pelt's cubicle being raided by FBI agents who discover a thesaurus. Van Pelt attempts to flee and is wrestled to the ground by the agents, shouting out, "Unhand me, you rapscallion!" The ad spoofed the recent steroid controversy in baseball surrounding players such as Barry Bonds and Jason Giambi, with a dejected Anderson concluding, "We gotta win back a lot of trust."
- A 2006 ad shows Scott Van Pelt and Stuart Scott jumping and stretching before a show, similar to what NBA players do before games. The ad ends with both men easily taking off their "warm-up suits" revealing their show suits underneath.
- In one ad Stuart Scott discusses "rain delays" and says that every so often there is one. Then they cut to a show where a leak from a pipe above the stage causes a grounds crew to come out and lay a tarp on the set. The anchors and grounds crew members are seen calling loved ones and chewing gum similarly to baseball players and fans. Scott says "You just hope it lets up."
- A 2007 ad features how a SportsCenter video game is made (this ad is a take on the sports video game craze).
- A 2008 ad features a coin toss between anchors Jay Harris and Brian Kenny to determine who will start the show.
- A 2008 ad features how SportsCenter viewers can decide which highlights to air via text messaging. They can choose one of the three options: have John Anderson read the highlights, have Jay Harris read the highlights or have a roller-skating cockatoo dunk a basketball. In the end, they chose the latter.
- A 2008 ad has anchors Steve Levy and John Anderson answering phone calls from viewers in a parody of sports call-in shows (including ESPN Radio).
- A 2008 ad has Scott Van Pelt and Neil Everett being "represented" by Drew Rosenhaus at the cafeteria. Rosenhaus negotiates the cost of their lunches from $23.50 down to $15, using many familiar tactics of player contract negotiation (For example: "What if I guarantee we'll be back tomorrow and give you an option for Friday?") Rosenhaus also offers to throw in incentives for extra chocolate pudding, with Van Pelt quickly piping up, "I want sprinkles."
- Van Pelt appeared in another sports agent spoof alongside "megaagent" Scott Boras. In the ad, Boras (known throughout baseball for his hardline negotiating tactics) represents Van Pelt, demanding (among other things) that the company name a sandwich after him in the cafeteria since Scott "uses more five-syllable words than any other anchor". When Boras demands an incentive clause allowing Scott to wear a Snuggie on-air for a year should he win an Emmy Award, the ESPN execs agree to "everything but the Snuggie", to which a stone-faced Boras replies, "We're gonna need the Snuggie."
- A recent ad features John Anderson being taken in a company expansion draft by ESPN Deportes. On a show, all he manages is "Hola!"
- A 2008 ad features the pit crews of Jeff Gordon and Jimmie Johnson helping anchors Scott Van Pelt and Neil Everett getting ready for the next segment during the commercial.
- A 2008 ad has anchor John Buccigross getting the ax and rallying for his job in a shopping center in a parody of coaches and managers getting fired.
- A 2007 ad has Jimmie Johnson using a pickaxe to slowly destroy a speed bump in the ESPN parking lot, as you see his race car near him, obviously too low to pass the bumps.
- A 2009 ad featured anchor John Anderson discussing that SportsCenter does do halftime shows, but unfortunately when the announcer introduces the hip-hop group the Jabbawockeez, many ESPN employees including anchors Brian Kenny and John Buccigross get out of the studio believing that the dance team looked like ghosts.
- A 2009 ad has anchor Jay Harris giving fellow anchor Brian Kenny a pep talk in the digital center, telling him "to concentrate".
- A 2010 ad has anchor Stuart Scott discussing how SportsCenter anchors get along despite having "different" personalities.
- A 2010 ad features various anchors doing charitable work throughout Bristol, Connecticut.
- A 2011 ad features various SportsCenter anchors capitalizing on the Twitter craze.

== Sports mascots ==
Sports mascots and cheerleaders are usually present in most ads, implying they work behind the scenes at ESPN. They are often seen casually milling around in the background, but occasionally they take on an active role:

- In a 2003 ad, when the show ends, everyone rushes out of the studio, creating a massive traffic jam. It then shows Mr. Met and Lady Met driving home on the freeway (with the Met children in the back), with Lady Met subtitled as saying they were glad to get out early. The New York Mets theme song, "Meet the Mets", is on their car radio. (A shorter version with just the Mets family has Lady Met accusing Mr. Met of making eyes at one of the female ESPN sportscasters.)
  - Mr. Met subsequently would take a lead role in a 2009 ad in which he is talking with Stuart Scott at a microwave. When Josh Hamilton shows up to use the microwave, Mr. Met angrily gestures at him and walks away. Hamilton is confused until Scott reveals that some of the balls Hamilton hit in the 2008 Home Run Derby were his cousins.
- Boston University's mascot, Rhett, appears in two "on-campus" spots in 2001. In one, he frustrates ESPN's doctor, who is trying to find his pulse. In the other, he joins Curt Schilling, Jesper Parnevik, Kenny Mayne, Stuart Scott, Linda Cohn, and others in spreading "the wave" around Bristol.
- Wake Forest University's mascot, the Demon Deacon, appears in a commercial featuring David Wright of the New York Mets, wherein Wright, John Anderson, and Neil Everett lampoon the baseball practice of covering the mouth with the glove while speaking on the field so that the opposing team cannot read the speaker's lips — they discuss where they are to meet for a party later that evening while covering their mouths, Wright with his glove, the anchors with folders.
- Billy the Marlin, the Florida Marlins' mascot, which always has an open mouth, is startled to find his "girlfriend," Andrea Kremer, kissing another SportsCenter anchor.
- The San Diego Chicken, who is seen pulling practical jokes all over the ESPN building; it is revealed at the end of the commercial that inside the costume was Pete Sampras, playing against his image as being humorless and robotic.
- Syracuse University's Otto the Orange, who gets punched by Charley Steiner after Steiner is described as being a boxing enthusiast.
- Sparty, the Michigan State Spartans' mascot, receives the final handoff of gymnast Kerri Strug as she is carried around the studio. The image is an allusion to US gymnastics coach Béla Károlyi carrying the injured Strug to accept her team gold medal at the 1996 Olympics.
- Steve Irwin ("The Crocodile Hunter") wrestled with Albert E. Gator when he spotted the Florida Gators mascot stepping out of an elevator.
- Big Red, the mascot of Western Kentucky University, is confused over which restroom to use until Rich Eisen instructs it to "use the woods out back."
- Stuart Scott gets food for the Milwaukee Brewers Racing Sausages. The Hot Dog chooses a hot dog, which causes Scott to remark "That's sick", then the Italian Sausage asks for pizza; the Sausages also appear in a 2007 spot where they chase the SportsCenter anchors down the halls of the ESPN studios, parodying Pamplona's Running of the Bulls.
- Sam the Minuteman, the mascot for the UMass Minutemen, knocks a tennis ball away from Andy Roddick as Roddick bounces it off his racket into the air in a waiting room.
- The Stanford Tree stares at anchor John Anderson after he throws a crumpled up piece of paper in the garbage can. Anderson is guilted into taking the paper out of the garbage and puts it into the recycling bin. The Tree makes another appearance in another ad where Jason Heyward describes to several anchors, in grisly detail, how a tree is cut into making his bat, which causes the Tree to faint.
- The Boston Red Sox mascot, Wally the Green Monster, reacts in shock after seeing Red Sox star David Ortiz wearing a New York Yankees hat. Ortiz was really just trying to break in the hat for Yankees catcher Jorge Posada.
- Rutgers University's Scarlet Knight appears in the Y2K episode chasing and then stomping on the University of Connecticut Husky, who was attempting to steal trophies in the chaos.
- In a 2002 ad, anchors Scott Van Pelt and Rich Eisen are saying some nonsensical words; as it turns out, it is none other than Boston Red Sox mascot Wally the Green Monster controlling the teleprompter until he is stopped by a producer. It is also the only SportsCenter commercial where the closing graphic "This is SportsCenter" does not appear at the end of the commercial. Instead it is replaced by "This is Spilifantrr", a take on the spot.
- The Blue Blob, a mascot of Xavier University, is shown eating Jim Kelly's NFL Hall of Fame jacket after beating him in rock paper scissors. Kelly then asks for best 2 out of 3, the Blue Blob declines.
- Brutus Buckeye, mascot for the Ohio State University, appears in the background performing Richard Simmons' conditioning exercises. He falls down in the end.
- A 2008 ad features the New York Jets Flight Crew asking anchor Chris McKendry advice on romantic relationships with players.
- A 2008 ad features former NASCAR driver and ESPN NASCAR analyst Rusty Wallace eating lunch with the University of Delaware mascot YoUDee, but when Wallace cannot eat his entire lunch, he gives the rest of his lunch to YoUDee and the mascot is able to swallow the food in one gulp.
- A 2008 ad has the University of Kansas mascot Big Jay working at the answering service when John Anderson's voice is heard on the answering machine.
- A 2008 ad has the New Jersey Devils mascot NJ Devil on an elevator when Jay Harris asks: "Goin' up?" and the Devil shakes his head, implying the Devil is using the elevator to descend to Hell. Harris then steps out of the elevator.
- A 2009 ad shows the thermostat in the office with a sign saying "Do Not Touch". The Pittsburgh Penguins' mascot, Iceburgh comes over and turns the temperature down. As the "This is SportsCenter" title is shown, NJ Devil comes over to turn the temperature back up.
- A 2009 ad features the UMass mascot, Sam the Minuteman, in a commercial about Brett Favre's comeback. The segment begins with Josh Elliot finding out Favre is coming back and words spreads from the copy room to the mail room to Brian Kenny and finally to Jay Harris, who alerts Sam the Minuteman of the comeback. Sam puts two lanterns in the window as Scott Van Pelt and Stuart Scott walk by, trying to figure out if it was one lantern or two to signify a comeback.
- A 2009 ad features the Oregon Duck in the office typing on the computer, the duck stops typing as he hears real ducks quacking from a pond outside the office. The mascot then leans back in his chair and lets out a sigh as the "This is SportsCenter" title is shown.
- In a 2010 ad, anchor Hannah Storm is seen washing her hands when the Milwaukee Brewers' mascot, Bernie Brewer enters the ladies' room. Storm tells the mascot to use the men's restroom.
- A 2010 ad features the Tennessee Volunteers mascot Smokey being told by Vince Doria not to bring animals to the studio. A dejected costumed Smokey then walks away in disgust.
- A 2010 ad features Josh Elliott coming out of the studio. While on his way to his car, he sees the Chicago White Sox mascot Southpaw and asks him if he wants a ride. Southpaw declines the offer.
- A 2010 ad features Steve Levy drinking water out of a fountain. Boxer Floyd Mayweather then splashes himself with the water before the Michigan State mascot Sparty attempts to drink the water as the "This is Sportscenter" graphic is shown.
- A 2010 ad features Derek Jeter in the ESPN men's locker room about to shave when he notices green hair in his razor. He asks ESPN employees Stuart Scott, Karl Ravech and Josh Elliot if they used his razor to which all answer in the negative. The color of the hair in the razor is not acknowledged by any party, as the Phillie Phanatic walks by with a towel around his waist, seemingly exiting from a shower. Jeter greets the Phanatic, still baffled by who used his razor.
- A 2010 ad features anchors John Buccigross and Dari Nowkhah coming out of the men's room complaining how bad it smells and then the Colorado Rockies mascot Dinger comes out with toilet paper popping out of his butt.
- A 2010 ad features the Georgia Bulldogs mascot who runs through the cupboards of the ESPN kitchen until he finally finds some animal crackers.
- A 2011 ad features the Maryland Terrapins mascot Testudo arriving late at a pre-show meeting.
- A 2011 ad features the Pittsburgh Pirates mascot Pirate Parrot finding some crackers in the garbage after anchor Dari Nowkhah throws them away.
- A 2011 ad starts with Joey Votto and Karl Ravech washing their hands in the bathroom while Ravech raves about how he will win a mustache contest, as Cincinnati Reds mascot Mr. Redlegs emerges from a stall. Votto tells Ravech "good luck with that" while Ravech tells Mr. Redlegs he will win the contest.
- A 2012 ad features Bucky Badger, mascot for University of Wisconsin, looking at online pictures of Wilma Wildcat, mascot for University of Arizona, on his computer, then quickly minimizes it when Hannah Storm stops by, asking Bucky if a story he's working on will be ready. When Hannah leaves, Bucky promptly returns to looking at pictures of Wilma.
- A 2012 ad featuring anchor Jay Harris and Chicago Bulls mascot Benny the Bull playing darts.
- A 2013 ad features Michigan State University's Sparty and Rutgers' Scarlet Knight. The mascots are in the SportsCenter break room, making protein shakes. Sparty is putting protein shake powder in a blender container when anchor Jay Harris comes in with banana, yogurt and strawberries and asks "hey fellas, you using both blenders?". Both mascots stare at Harris awkwardly and Sparty deliberately turns on the blender. Harris leaves in frustration.
- A 2013 ad features the Western Kentucky mascot, Big Red, trying and failing to climb into Brad Keselowski's race car trying to get a ride home. Keselowski suggests that Red ride with Kevin Negandhi, who is leaving for the night, but Red continues to try to get in despite the fact he cannot fit.
- A 2014 ad has U.S. women's soccer players Hope Solo and Alex Morgan playing keepie uppie with T.D., mascot for the Miami Dolphins. Jay Harris asks to join in, and promptly loses control of the ball, much to the frustration of the others.
- As part of the buildup toward Super Bowl XLVIII, Jay Crawford and Steve Levy are in an elevator which is boarded by Miles, the Denver Broncos mascot. Shortly before the elevator door closes the Seattle Seahawks' mascot, Blitz, who promptly knocks a clipboard out of Miles' hands. Miles responds by touching all of the floor buttons on the elevator and leaving, with Blitz chasing him. Crawford and Levy lament that this was only the beginning of Super Bowl week and there is still more to come. The Super Bowl was in New York that year, which is just over 100 miles southwest of ESPN's home base.
- In a follow-up ad, Miles is in the men's restroom as he tries to put on a Seahawks jersey while being mocked by Stuart Scott following a lost bet.
- A 2015 ad has the Stanford Tree shredding some papers while being mocked by anchor Kevin Connors since paper is made from trees.
- A 2016 ad features anchor John Anderson holding a post-show press conference in a parody of pre-game and post-game news conferences. However, the "reporters" turned out to be mascots Wally, Mr. Met, Slugggrrr, Billy the Marlin, Clark the Cub and the Phillie Phanatic.
- A 2016 ad features Miami Marlins mascot Billy the Marlin allegedly pulling a prank on Olympic swimmer Ryan Lochte by tossing some tuna fish on Lochte's keyboard.
- A 2017 ad features a collection of mascots attempting to hold a conference call. Because all of them are mute, and respond only by nodding or shaking their heads, the person on the other end of the line mistakenly believes the phone line is dead.
- A 2017 ad features Boston Red Sox mascot Wally the Green Monster working as a meteorologist but he gets in the way of the forecast and ends up getting replaced by Seattle Mariners mascot the Mariner Moose.
- A 2019 ad features ESPN MLB insider Buster Olney grabbing some honey only to be confronted by Chicago Cubs mascot Clark the Cub.
- A 2023 ad features Olympic-gold medal-winning Sydney McLaughlin snatching her gold medal from San Francisco 49ers mascot Sourdough Sam's neck after she finds her medal gone.
- A 2024 ad features Olympic gold medal-winning swimmer Katie Ledecky and anchor Nicole Briscoe about to get some lunch when they see Miami Marlins mascot Billy the Marlin guarding the buffet idea (most notably the fish filets). However, fellow anchor Gary Striewski manages to pass Billy in the process, much to Ledecky and Briscoe's astonishment.
