= Linda Cohn =

American sportscaster (born 1959)

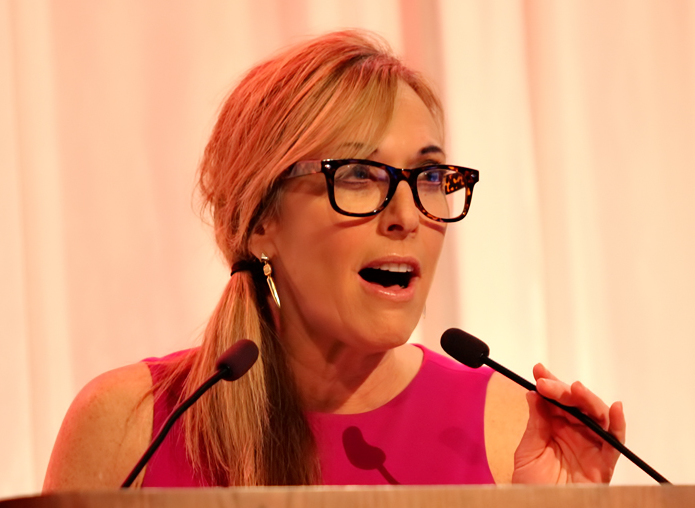
- Cohn in 2015
- Born: November 10, 1959 (age 67)
- Education: State University of New York at Oswego
- Occupation: Sportscaster
- Employer: ESPN (1992–2026)
- Spouse: Stew Kaufman (m. 1985; div. 2008)
- Children: 2

Linda Cohn (born November 10, 1959) is an American sportscaster best known for her tenure at ESPN, serving as an anchor on SportsCenter from 1992 to 2026.

== Early life and education ==
Cohn grew up in a Jewish family on Long Island, New York. As a child, she would watch sports on TV with her father, who is a huge sports fan. When she was 15, her mother found a hockey league where she could play with boys, although the boys were eight or nine years old. As a teenager, Cohn demonstrated talent at ice hockey as a goaltender, making her high school's boys team. Although she didn't make her high school hockey team as a junior, she ended up making the team as a senior. After graduating from Newfield High School in Selden, Cohn attended SUNY Oswego, where she was the goalie for the women's ice hockey team. She graduated with a bachelor's degree in arts and communications in 1981. Cohn was inducted to the Oswego State Athletics Hall of Fame in 2006.

== Career ==
=== Early years ===
Cohn debuted as a sports anchor for the Patchogue, New York-based radio station WALK-AM (also WALK-FM) in 1981 and worked there for four years. After leaving that station in 1984, she worked as a sports anchor for four other New York area radio stations until 1987, including a brief stint as an update person at WFAN in New York City.

=== 1987–1991 ===
In 1987, Cohn made sportscasting history by becoming the first full-time U.S. female sports anchor on a national radio network when she was hired by ABC. She anchored WABC TalkRadio from 1987 to 1989. In 1988, Cohn got her first television break, after being hired by what was at the time one of ESPN's top competitors, SportsChannel America. In 1989, she hosted a call-in radio sports show in New York.

Cohn was a reporter at the SportsChannel America Network before being hired by KIRO-TV in Seattle, Washington in October 1989 to work as a sports anchor there.

=== ESPN (1992–2026) ===
Cohn returned to the East Coast in 1992, when she was hired by ESPN to work on SportsCenter. She anchored her first SportsCenter on July 11, 1992, with Chris Myers. She has also been featured in many of the show's This Is SportsCenter commercials. Despite her success, Cohn was almost fired in 1994 because the network argued that she wasn't showing her love for sports on TV. The company gave her six months to improve and hired a video coach to help her out.

In addition to her work as a sports journalist, Cohn made a name for herself as a prognosticator during the 1997 NCAA basketball tournament. Her bracket that year for ESPN accurately predicted 15th-seeded Coppin State University’s shocking victory over South Carolina in the first round, to this day one of the greatest upsets in the tournament's history.

In 2005, Cohn signed a contract extension with ESPN, which added play-by-play for WNBA telecasts to her duties. On June 20, 2008, ESPN announced that Cohn would be a regular anchor for the new morning block of SportsCenter, which launched on August 11 that year. She was to have been the co-anchor, alongside Steve Berthiaume, of the first three hours of the block, from 6 to 9 a.m. ET on weekdays. Several weeks later, however, ESPN announced that the new SportsCenter morning block would be scaled back from nine to six hours.

She hosted her 5,000th edition of SportsCenter on February 21, 2016, a record for SportsCenter anchors. Cohn continues to regularly anchor SportsCenter from 1–3 p.m. ET Monday through Friday. She is also the host of the podcast "Listen Closely to Linda Cohn".

Cohn has reported, commentated, interviewed, written, and called play-by-play throughout her career at ESPN. Since 2016, she has co-hosted SportsCenter from Los Angeles on weekends with Neil Everett.

The network suspended Cohn for saying in an April 2017 radio interview that left-wing bias at the network had contributed to a loss of subscribers.

In mid-July 2018, ESPN issued a press release announcing that Cohn had "signed a new deal to remain with the company for years to come." The contract included continued anchor duties on SportsCenter and increased ice hockey coverage. Executive Vice President Norby Williamson noted that in her 26 years with the network, Cohn had "hosted more SportsCenters than anyone else." The deal says she will continue as primary host of In the Crease on ESPN+ as it expands to five nights a week during the NHL season and will contribute hockey-related interviews and features to SportsCenter and other ESPN platforms.

In June 2026, Cohn announced her retirement from ESPN after 34 years at the network, and more than 5,500 episodes of SportsCenter, a record.

=== Author ===
In 2008, Cohn released her memoir, Cohn-Head: A No-Holds-Barred Account of Breaking Into the Boys' Club, in which she recounts her passion for sports and her experiences working on SportsCenter.

== Personal life ==
Cohn has two children with her ex-husband Stew Kaufman. The couple divorced in 2008.

In 2014, Cohn was named one of the 25 most influential women in sports. She is a fan of the New York Giants, New York Mets, New York Knicks, and New York Rangers.

Cohn was a member of the 13-person panel that selected the Top 100 Players in Giants history.
