= KCST =

KCST may refer to:

- KCST, King's Crown Shakespeare Troupe at Columbia University
- Korean Committee of Space Technology, North Korea's space agency
- KCST-FM, a radio station (106.9 FM) licensed to Florence, Oregon, United States
- KCST-LP, a defunct low-power television station (channel 47) formerly licensed to Hoquiam, Washington, United States
- KCFM (AM), a radio station (1250 AM) licensed to Florence, Oregon, United States, which held the call sign KCST from 1988 to 2009
- KNSD, a television station (digital channel 40) licensed to San Diego, California, United States, which held the call signs KCST or KCST-TV from 1968 to 1988
