= KCFM =

KCFM may refer to:

- KCFM (AM), a radio station (1250 AM) licensed to Florence, Oregon, United States
- KCFM (FM), a radio station (99.8 FM) based in Hull, East Riding of Yorkshire, England
- Former callsign for KSD (FM), a radio station (93.7 FM) based in St. Louis, Missouri, United States
