= Michigan State–Penn State football rivalry =

American college football rivalry

Battle for the Land Grant
- Michigan State Spartans Penn State Nittany Lions
- First meeting: November 13, 1914; Michigan Agricultural, 6–3
- Latest meeting: November 15, 2025; Penn State, 28–10
- Next meeting: 2027
- Trophy: Land Grant Trophy

Statistics
- Total meetings: 39
- All-time series: Penn State leads, 20–18–1
- Trophy series: Penn State leads, 19–10
- Largest victory: Michigan State, 55–16 (2015); Penn State, 61–7 (2002)
- Longest win streak: Michigan State, 5 (1949–1966)
- Longest unbeaten streak: Michigan State, 8 (1945–1966)
- Current win streak: Penn State, 3 (2022–present)

Locations of Michigan State and Penn State

The Battle for the Land Grant is an American college football rivalry between the Michigan State Spartans and Penn State Nittany Lions. The Land Grant Trophy is presented to the winner of the game. Penn State leads 19–10 since joining the Big Ten. Penn State leads the series 20–18–1, with Penn State winning the most recent matchup in 2025.

== Series history ==
When Penn State joined the Big Ten Conference in 1993, the Nittany Lions and Spartans were designated as permanent rivals until 2023, and had met each other for the trophy in the last week of conference play. The trophy, designed in 1993 by Michigan State coach George Perles and Penn State coach Joe Paterno, features pictures of Penn State's Old Main and Michigan State's Beaumont Tower, as well as figurines of The Spartan and Nittany Lion Shrine statues.

On September 24, 2005, during Michigan week, a couple of Penn State students brazenly defaced the newly installed bronze Sparty statue. “It happened during broad daylight, with people all around” according to MSU police Sgt. Randy Holton. The statue was splattered with blue paint and the base tagged with the letters PSU. The perpetrators were able to evade capture despite the incident occurring in the middle of the day, during the traditional period of time when the statue is guarded by MSU student employees and Spartan Marching Band members, in what is called Sparty Watch.

In 2011, Nebraska joined the Big Ten, and the conference split into two divisions. Michigan State was in the Legends division and Penn State was in the Leaders division, so they no longer played each other annually. Instead, Indiana and Nebraska were designated as Michigan State and Penn State's permanent rivals, respectively. Under this setup, Penn State and Michigan State would compete on average two out of every five years, but the two teams did not play against each other during the three years that this system was in effect (2011–13).

In 2014, when Maryland and Rutgers joined the Big Ten, the conference was realigned into two geographically based divisions, East and West. Michigan State and Penn State are both in the East division, and thus resumed a yearly series.

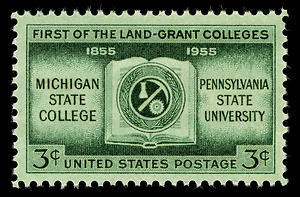
United States Postal Service commemorative stamp

Michigan State University followed by Penn State University, both founded in 1855, are the nation's oldest land-grant universities, hence the name for the trophy. In 1955 on the 100th anniversary of the founding of the land grant system, Michigan State and Penn State were commemorated on a U.S. postage stamp honoring the "First of the Land-Grant Colleges". These two universities were the first ever universities to be placed on a U.S. postage stamp.

Fellow Big Ten members Illinois, Minnesota, Ohio State, Purdue, Wisconsin, Maryland, Nebraska, and Rutgers are also land-grant schools.

== Game results ==
Michigan State victories	Penn State victories	Tie games

No.	Date	Location	Winning team		Losing team	
1	November 13, 1914	State College, PA	Michigan Agricultural	6	Penn State	3
2	October 24, 1925	State College, PA	Penn State	13	Michigan State	6
3	November 17, 1945	East Lansing, MI	Michigan State	33	Penn State	0
4	October 19, 1946	State College, PA	Michigan State	19	#12 Penn State	16
5	October 23, 1948	State College, PA	Tie	14	Tie	14
6	October 22, 1949	East Lansing, MI	Michigan State	24	Penn State	0
7	October 20, 1951	State College, PA	#3 Michigan State	32	Penn State	21
8	October 25, 1952	East Lansing, MI	#1 Michigan State	34	Penn State	7
9	September 25, 1965	State College, PA	Michigan State	23	Penn State	0
10	September 24, 1966	East Lansing, MI	#1 Michigan State	42	Penn State	8
11	November 27, 1993	East Lansing, MI	#14 Penn State	38	#25 Michigan State	37
12	November 26, 1994	State College, PA	#2 Penn State	59	Michigan State	31
13	November 25, 1995	East Lansing, MI	#14 Penn State	25	Michigan State	20
14	November 23, 1996	State College, PA	#7 Penn State	32	Michigan State	29
15	November 29, 1997	East Lansing, MI	Michigan State	49	#4 Penn State	14
16	November 28, 1998	State College, PA	#23 Penn State	51	Michigan State	28
17	November 20, 1999	East Lansing, MI	#15 Michigan State	35	#13 Penn State	28
18	November 18, 2000	State College, PA	Penn State	42	Michigan State	23
19	November 24, 2001	East Lansing, MI	Penn State	42	Michigan State	37
20	November 23, 2002	State College, PA	#16 Penn State	61	Michigan State	7

No.	Date	Location	Winning team		Losing team	
21	November 22, 2003	East Lansing, MI	Michigan State	41	Penn State	10
22	November 20, 2004	State College, PA	Penn State	37	Michigan State	13
23	November 19, 2005‡	East Lansing, MI	#5 Penn State	31	Michigan State	22
24	November 18, 2006	State College, PA	Penn State	17	Michigan State	13
25	November 17, 2007	East Lansing, MI	Michigan State	35	Penn State	31
26	November 22, 2008	State College, PA	#8 Penn State	49	#15 Michigan State	18
27	November 21, 2009	East Lansing, MI	#14 Penn State	42	Michigan State	14
28	November 27, 2010	State College, PA	#10 Michigan State	28	Penn State	22
29	November 29, 2014	State College, PA	#10 Michigan State	34	Penn State	10
30	November 28, 2015	East Lansing, MI	#6 Michigan State	55	Penn State	16
31	November 26, 2016	State College, PA	#7 Penn State	45	Michigan State	12
32	November 4, 2017	East Lansing, MI	#24 Michigan State	27	#7 Penn State	24
33	October 13, 2018	State College, PA	Michigan State	21	#8 Penn State	17
34	October 26, 2019	East Lansing, MI	#6 Penn State	28	Michigan State	7
35	December 12, 2020	State College, PA	Penn State	39	Michigan State	24
36	November 27, 2021	East Lansing, MI	#12 Michigan State	30	Penn State	27
37	November 26, 2022	State College, PA	#11 Penn State	35	Michigan State	16
38	November 24, 2023	Detroit, MI	#11 Penn State	42	Michigan State	0
39	November 15, 2025	East Lansing, MI	Penn State	28	Michigan State	10
Series: Penn State leads 20–18–1

‡ Hosted ESPN's College Gameday

== See also ==
- List of NCAA college football rivalry games
