= Billy the Marlin =

Official mascot of the Miami Marlins baseball team

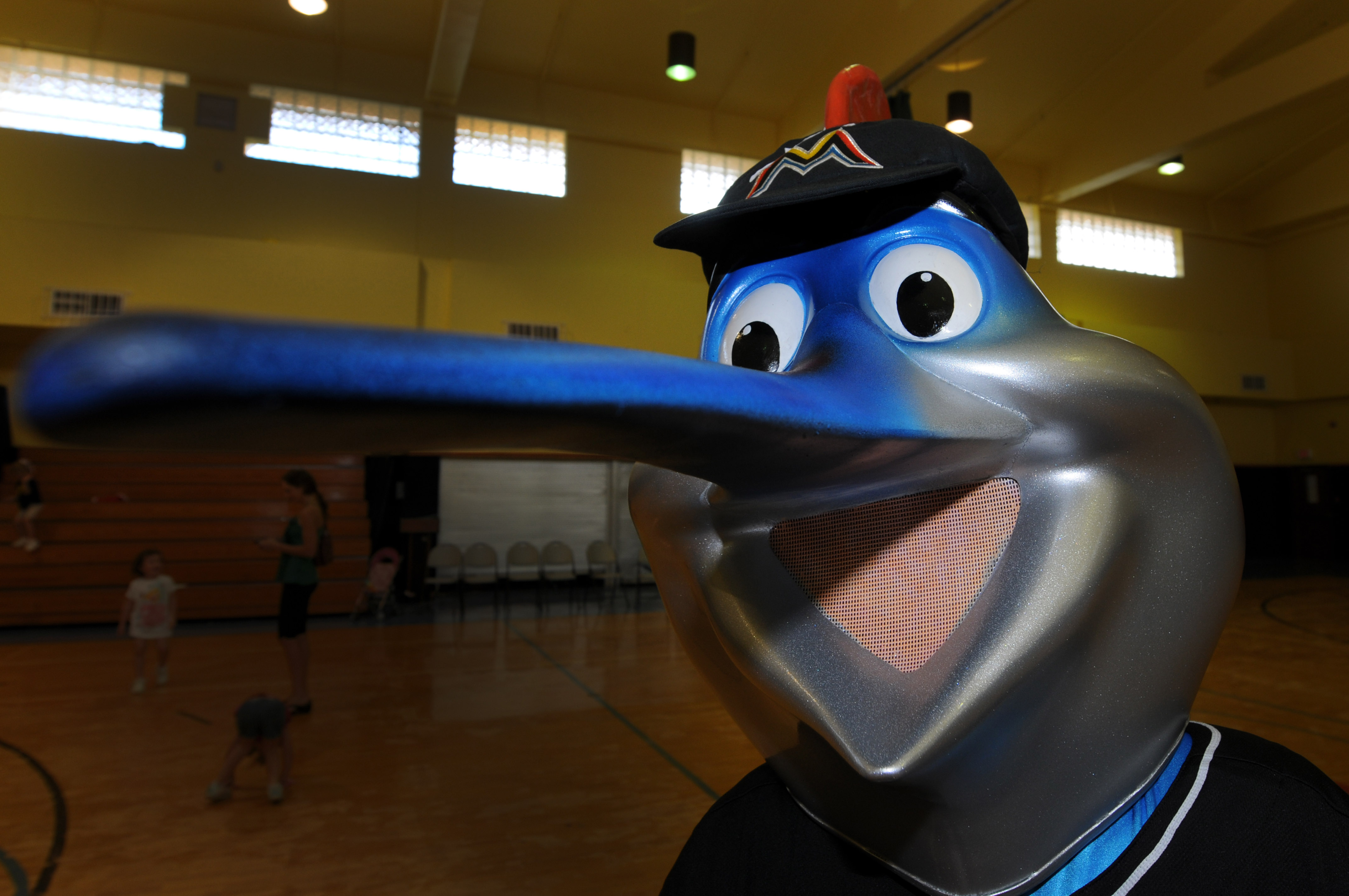
- Billy the Marlin after the team's rebranding in 2011
- Team: Miami Marlins
- Description: Marlin
- Origin of name: Bill
- Website: Official website

Billy the Marlin is the official mascot of the Miami Marlins baseball franchise. At 8 feet tall and 250 pounds, he is "a natural-born clown and good-natured prankster". He appears at every Marlins home game at LoanDepot Park, and performs his own routine in the middle of the 5th inning.

== Early history ==
Of unknown age, the character debuted on February 25, 1993. According to his employers, Billy the Marlin "was handpicked not only for his skill, cunning and great competitive nature, but most of all for his outstanding sense of humor and great rapport with baseball fans of all ages." Officially the son of William and Willamina Marlin.

His name was picked by original owner Wayne Huizenga because a marlin is a type of billfish, and Mr. Huizenga reportedly wanted a name that was different from the baseball-type names of other mascots, easier for children to remember.

== Skydiving mishap ==
U.S. Navy SEAL parachutist, Lou Langlais, dressed as Billy the Marlin, lost the costume's five-pound head to a gust of wind while parachuting towards (the then named) Pro Player Stadium on Opening Day of the 1997 season, April 1. Langlais altered his course to land outside the stadium, allowing another Billy to make a regular appearance on the field. The head was recovered in good shape, apart from a scratch to the neck, two months later by Victor Rowe and Mike Zinniger at the side of Florida's Turnpike.

== John Routh's tenure ==
For the first ten years in the major leagues he was played by John Routh (who at the time also portrayed Sebastian the Ibis at Miami Hurricanes sporting events), until he was fired in 2003 as part of budget cuts. Routh was reported to have been earning in excess of $80,000 p.a. at the time.

During Routh's tenure, Billy the Marlin regularly launched a tightly wadded T-shirt out of a pressurized air gun. In one instance, a shirt accidentally hit an elderly man in the eye, temporarily knocking the man unconscious. The man later filed an unsuccessful $250,000 lawsuit. After a five-day trial, Routh was found "not negligent" by the jury. The man's companion at the game admitted that during a scramble for a T-shirt that landed in the row in front of them, that another fan may have hit him with an elbow. During the trial, a local TV station wanted footage of Routh testifying, but the judge ruled that "just as children believe in Santa Claus, South Florida children believe in Billy the Marlin", so Routh's face was ordered to not be shown.

== After Routh ==
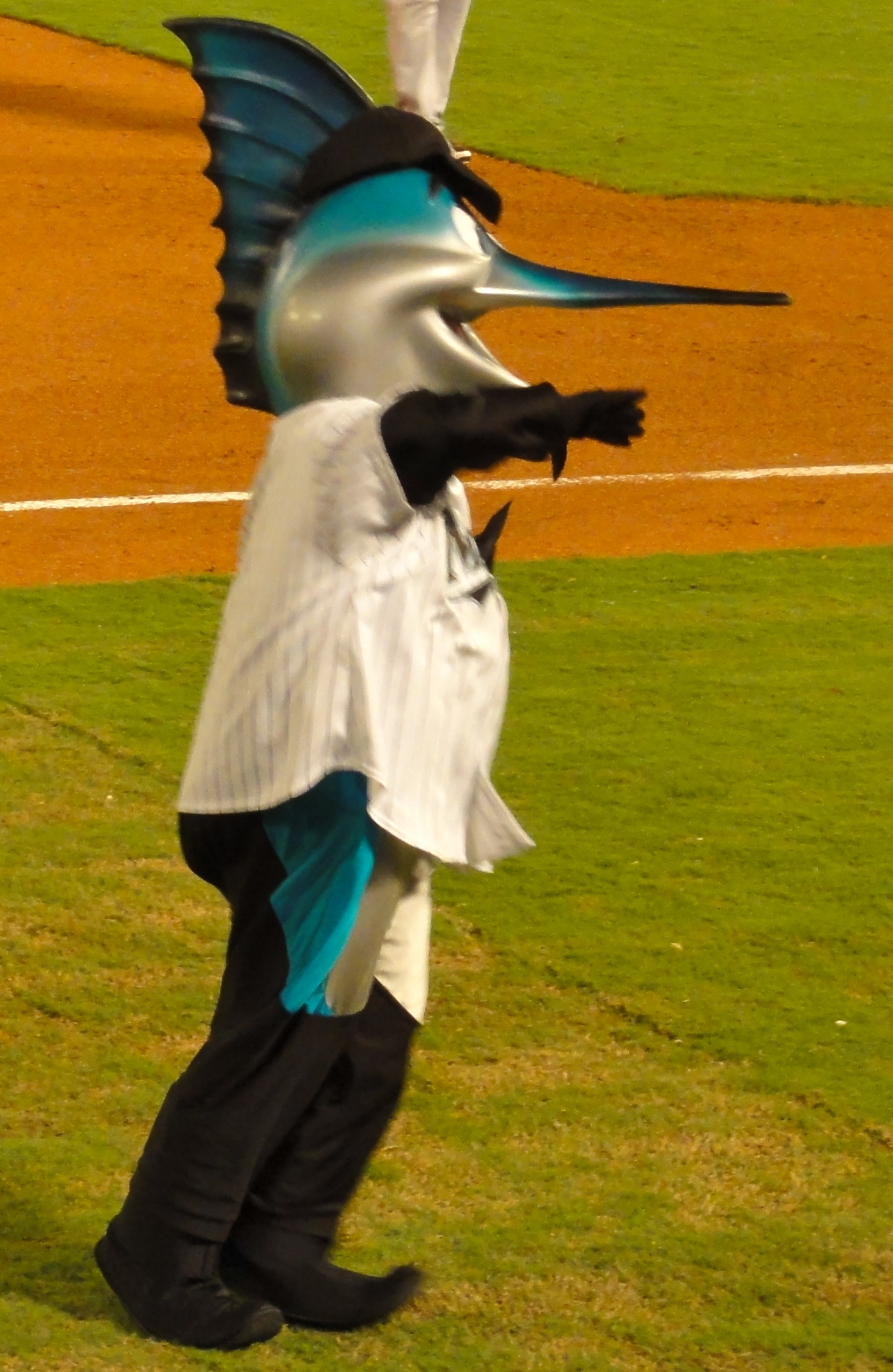
Billy the Marlin in 2011

On September 13, 2004, Billy the Marlin made a home game appearance at U.S. Cellular Field. The Florida Marlins, displaced because of Hurricane Ivan, beat the Montreal Expos 6-3 in Chicago in the relocated game.

In 2005, Billy the Marlin made some 450 appearances a year outside of games, the Marlins charging $350 an hour. In contrast to the Routh era when he was allowed to keep all of his off-field income, the Marlins split appearance money with the mascot's portrayer – the team's portion going to the team's charitable foundation.

Topps featured Billy the Marlin in their 2007 Opening Day Baseball series as card #198, released 03/14/2007.

== Current activities ==
Billy the Marlin was nominated for the Mascot Hall of Fame's "Golden Silly String Award" in August 2008. His opponents in the professional category were Globie (Harlem Globetrotters), Hugo (Charlotte Hornets), Rocky (Denver Nuggets), and Slider (Cleveland Indians). In spite of winning the readers' on-line poll, Billy ultimately lost the inductee position to Slider.

Billy's Bunch is an official fan club for kids ages 12 and under. Billy's Bunch is also the name of a 30-minute SunSports/FSFlorida TV show. Formerly Marlins StrikeZone, the new format premiered April 5, 2008.

Billy the Marlin also has starred in several This is SportsCenter commercials.

== See also ==
- List of Major League Baseball mascots
