= Leonard D. Jungwirth =

American sculptor

Leonard D. Jungwirth (October 18, 1903 –August 21, 1963 or 1964) American sculptor born in Detroit, Michigan. He studied with his father Joachim Jungwirth, a Detroit wood carver. His formal education was furthered at the School of Fine Arts and Wayne State University (B.A., 1927) both in Detroit. He spent 1929 through 1933 studying at the Royal Academy of Fine Arts in Munich, Germany.

He returned to Detroit, where he taught at Wayne State from 1936 to 1940. During some of that period, he also served as a supervisor in the WPA's Federal Art Project, for whom he created several works, notably a statue of Gabriel Richard located at the entrance to the Belle Isle Bridge.

In 1940 he moved to East Lansing, Michigan, where he was employed at what is now Michigan State University. He remained there until his death in 1963. While there he created his (arguably) best-known work, The Spartan. Jungwirth also made the Stations of the Cross for St. Thomas Aquinas Church in East Lansing.
