= Wally the Green Monster =

Mascot of the Boston Red Sox

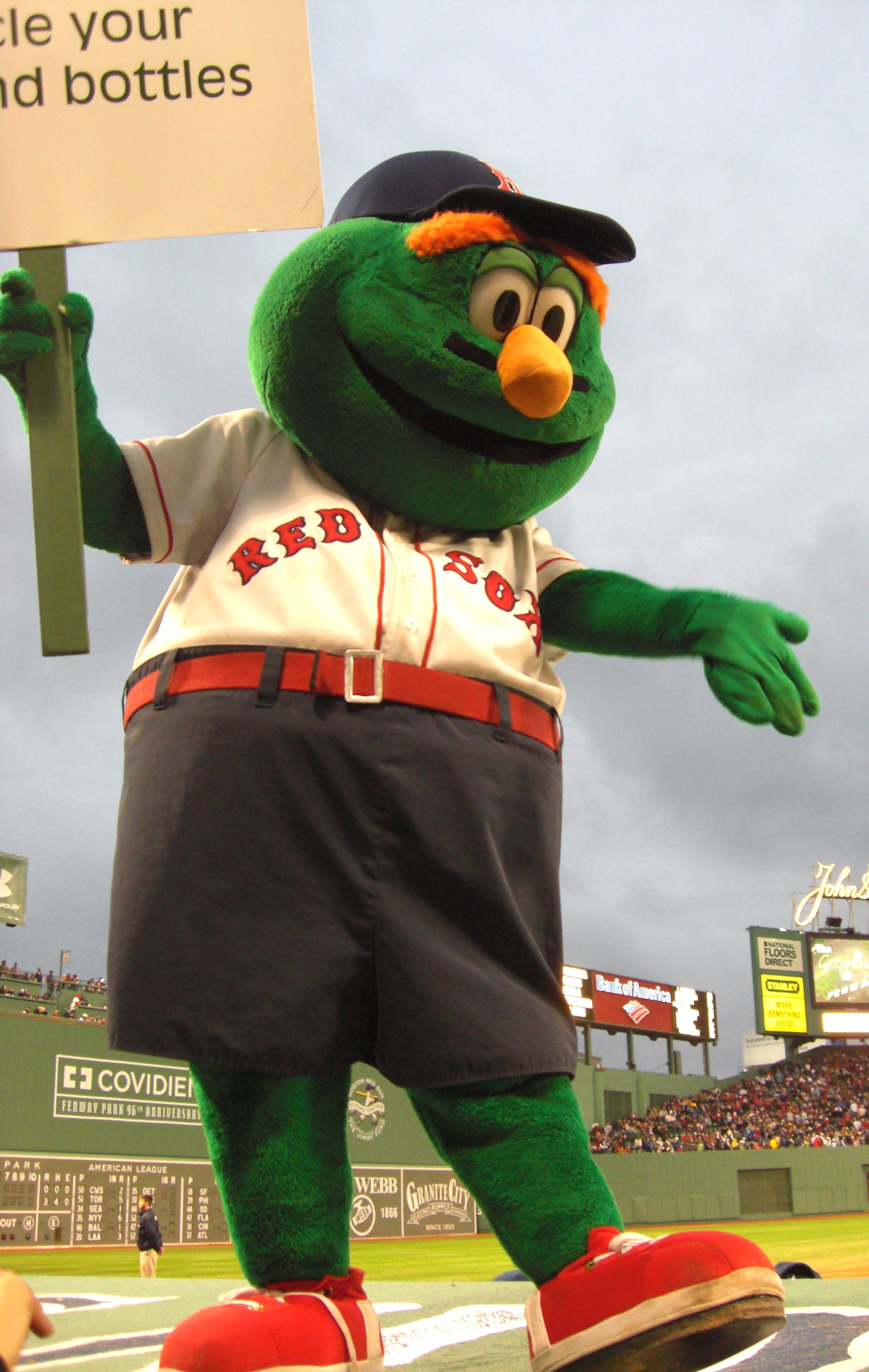
- Team: Boston Red Sox
- Origin of name: The Green Monster
- First seen: April 13, 1997
- Website: Official Website

Wally the Green Monster is the official mascot for the Boston Red Sox. His name is derived from the Green Monster, the nickname of the 37-foot 2-inch wall in left field at Fenway Park. Wally debuted on April 13, 1997.

== History ==
In 1992, Larry Cancro, the chief of marketing for the Red Sox, had the idea to create a mascot to make Fenway Park more appealing to children. The mascot was designed to be a green monster, and given the backstory that he had been living in the Green Monster for years, and had finally come out. Writer Rick Dunfey was hired to write The Legend of Wally the Green Monster, a children's book about the mascot, and decided to name him Wally in reference to the wall. The book was published under the pen name Maxwell M. Carey. On April 13, 1997, Wally the Green Monster was revealed to the public on "Kids Opening Day" in Fenway Park, and copies of Dunfey's book were distributed for free. Jerry Remy, a Red Sox player and later commentator, co-wrote a series of books about Wally.

While popular among children, Wally was booed early on by adults after his release, due to fans disliking his cartoonish appearance and break with tradition, but has since become accepted as a mascot.

From 2000 to 2017, Wally was played by Chris Bergstrom, who was later promoted to director of fan and youth engagement for the Red Sox.

In 2010, the Red Sox partnered with Dunkin' Donuts to release the Wally the Green Monster Coolatta, a frozen slush drink available in New England shops.

Throughout his history, Wally went through a number of redesigns, including a more muscular form in 2004 and having a beard in 2013, due to many other Red Sox players having beards. In 2016, the Red Sox introduced Tessie, another mascot designed to be the younger sister of Wally, named after the song "Tessie" sung by the Royal Rooters.

In July 2012, the mascot costume was reported as missing, leading the Boston Police to put out a bulletin looking for Wally. The incident was later revealed to be a misunderstanding; a Red Sox employee had taken the costume for scheduled appearances and had decided to wear it around Boston. The employee was not charged.

On April 2, 2017, the Red Sox premiered Wally's Opening Day, a 30-minute animated special about Wally preparing Fenway Park, for the 20th anniversary of Wally's release as part of an initiative by the club to appeal to children. Wally's Opening Day was the first television animation produced by a Major League Baseball club. Linda Henry, wife of Red Sox principal owner John W. Henry, served as executive producer.

== Rivalry ==
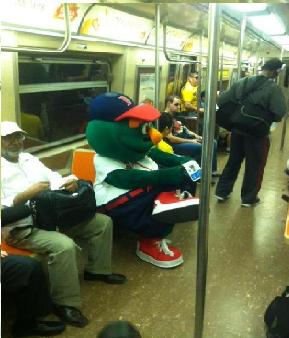
Wally on a New York City subway in 2012

Wally has had a rivalry with Tampa Bay Rays mascot Raymond, who once drove over a small doll of Wally with an all-terrain vehicle.

In 2007, Wally was featured in a commercial for ESPN's SportsCenter with David Ortiz, Jorge Posada and SportsCenter anchor Stan Verrett, showcasing the Red Sox–Yankees rivalry.

In 2019, Wally took a photo with Jennifer Lopez, who was engaged to former New York Yankees player Alex Rodriguez at the time and tweeted a photo at him. During the 2019 MLB London Series, both Rodriguez and Wally posted a photo to social media accounts of Wally appearing to strangle Rodriguez.

== See also ==
- List of Major League Baseball mascots
