= Sparty =

Mascot of Michigan State University

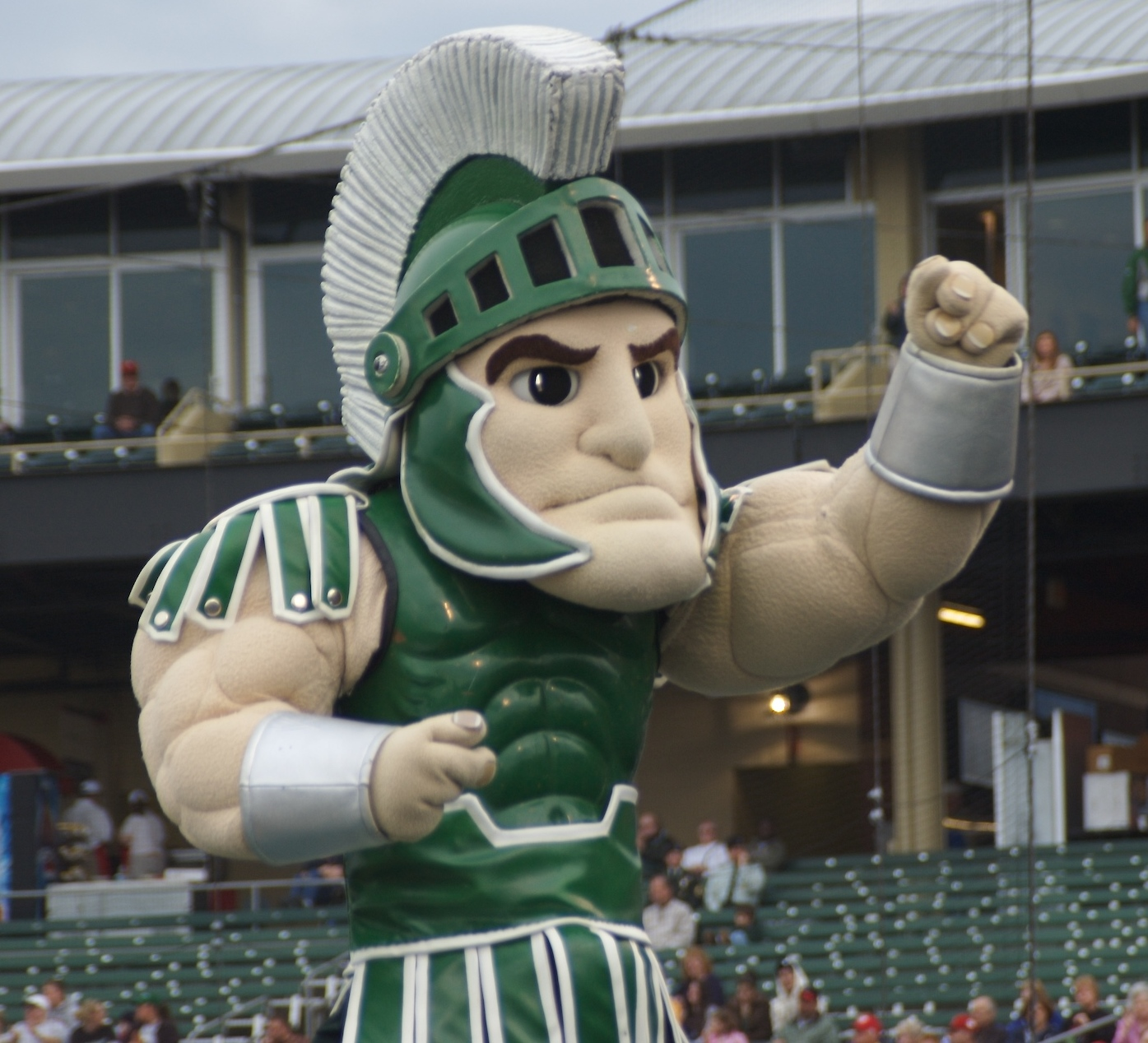
- Sparty at a baseball game between Michigan State and the Lansing Lugnuts in 2007.
- University: Michigan State University
- Conference: Big Ten
- Description: Male Spartan warrior

Sparty is the mascot of Michigan State University. Sparty is usually depicted as a muscular male Spartan warrior/athlete dressed in stylized Greek costume. After changing the team name from "Aggies" to "Spartans" in 1925, various incarnations of a Spartan warrior with a prominent chin appeared at university events and in university literature. In 1943, MSU art professor Leonard D. Jungwirth designed a statue for the university, which had to be cast in terra cotta because of World War II rationing. In 2005, the university replaced Jungwirth's original statue with a bronze replica, moving the original indoors to protect it from the elements.

Sparty appears in several other incarnations. In printed literature, the university uses a copyrighted cartoon Spartan, usually drawn with a grimace and several days worth of whiskers, lending the nickname of "Gruff" Sparty. Finally, Sparty appears as a foam rubber mascot with an oversized head. The mascot costume, worn by an anonymous student, appears at most university sporting, alumni, and fundraising events; he is often portrayed in MSU notices and materials.

== History ==
Though MSU is now a large university, in the 19th century it was a small agricultural college known as the State Agricultural College of Michigan. Thus, when the college fielded its first intercollegiate sports teams in the 1880s, the teams were appropriately named the "Aggies". By 1925, the school had expanded beyond agriculture, becoming Michigan State College of Agriculture and Applied Science. To reduce the emphasis on agriculture, the college held a contest to choose a new team name. The chosen entry was the "Michigan Staters."

In 1926, during Michigan State’s first southern baseball training tour, the enduring “Spartans” nickname was born. Lansing State Journal sports editor George S. Alderton found the name chosen by the students too long and awkward for headlines and began searching for a better alternative.

Reviewing unused entries from the original naming contest, Alderton discovered “Spartans” and began using it quietly in game stories before moving it into headlines. The name quickly gained acceptance, was picked up by rival newspapers, and soon appeared in student publications. With no objections from students, alumni, or college officials, “Spartans” became the permanent nickname—and one that has lasted for generations.

== Costumed mascot ==
This 1951 image, predating Sparty, shows a Spartan football player as a beaver trapper.

While MSU students and alumni often refer to the Spartan statue as Sparty, the incarnation of Sparty with national visibility is that of a costumed mascot who appears at athletic events and other university-related functions. The first mascot appeared in 1955 and was a papier-mâché Spartan head made by Theta Xi fraternity brothers Donald Pais, Kenneth Roberts, and Don Bauer. By the 1956 Rose Bowl Game, the papier-mâché head had been replaced by a fiberglass version that was thirty pounds lighter. In 1985, MSU Alumni Association Graphic Designer Dave Giordan was asked to draw a muscular Sparty in full body armor. Four years later, in 1989, a group came together to design and revamp the Sparty mascot. Character designer Tom Sapp of Real Characters, Inc. was hired to design and create a new Sparty character and costume. Research was conducted on Michigan State’s mission, community, and traditions. The result was an “approachable, fierce yet kind, man for all seasons” mascot. Sparty would reflect the university’s strength and character. To introduce MSU's new mascot, six billboards designed by Tom Sapp were positioned around East Lansing announcing his Spartan Stadium debut. The costume, with a cartoonishly oversized head, bulging muscles, and a facial expression that treads a fine line between cute and pugnacious, was introduced to MSU fans during the 1989 football season. Sparty was an immediate hit, in part because the foam-rubber body parts, vinyl breastplate, and skirt have a freedom of movement that allow the anonymous student who portrays Sparty to be quite expressive despite the costume's fixed stare. The student that portrays Sparty is a volunteer, despite rumors of financial compensation or a full scholarship. Early every calendar year, tryouts are held for the student to portray Sparty for the upcoming school year. Sparty represents an ancient Spartan warrior, but wears a late Imperial-style Roman legionary's helmet, which was not invented until several centuries after Sparta was subdued by the Roman Republic.

Sparty can be found entertaining MSU sporting event crowds with his antics during games. He is even lifted upon the shoulders of cheerleaders and does one-handed push ups. Besides sporting events, Sparty also attends many events around campus, the community, and the country throughout the year: alumni functions, charity events, weddings, bar mitzvahs, parades, and many other university events. Any revenues generated go to the upkeep of the Sparty Mascot Program, which is funded mainly by the MSU Alumni Association.

Sparty came to national prominence in the mid-1990s with his appearance in a series of television ads promoting ESPN's SportsCenter. One advertisement depicted Sparty carrying gymnast Kerri Strug in the manner of Beauty and the Beast—or, more to the point, Béla Károlyi, who carried the injured Strug to the medal platform to accept her team gold medal at the 1996 Summer Olympics. He also appeared in ESPN ads with background cameos, such as eating in a diner booth or browsing the shelves of a bookstore. In 2004, Sparty won the Best Mascot National Championship at the Universal Cheer Association/Universal Dance Association College Nationals, becoming the first Big Ten Conference mascot to do so. He won Best Mascot for the second year in a row after securing the honor again the following year. In addition to his title of "best mascot", Sparty was voted the "Buffest Mascot" by Muscle and Fitness magazine. Sparty was even found in the refrigerators of local stores and many alumni when Sparty was featured on a series of Jones Soda bottles in late 2004, and he appeared again in 2005. Sparty was one of six college mascots nominated for the Mascot Hall of Fame in July 2006. In the summer of 2006, Alltel Wireless aired a commercial featuring ESPN's Lee Corso and Sparty.

Three years after winning top honors for the first time, Sparty was again named best mascot. It was Sparty's third title in just four years. His skit, "Sparty's Spectacular", featured music from many different genres, including rock, country, and Riverdance. To qualify for nationals, Sparty submitted a video showcasing his performances at athletic events and community service events.

Sparty appeared on the cover of the Wii version of NCAA Football 09, the first time a non-athlete was featured on it. EA Sports had a poll to see which mascot would appear on the cover, and Sparty won by over 75,000 votes.

== Statues ==
The Spartan
- "Sparty"
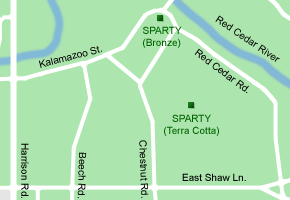
- The location of the two "Sparty" statues.
- Artist: Leonard Jungwirth (sculptor)
- Year: 1945 (terra cotta); 2005 (bronze)
- Type: Statue (Modernist, Futurist, Cubist)
- Medium: Bronze; terra cotta
- Subject: Spartan mascot
- Dimensions: 9 ft 7 in (2.92 m) tall
- Location: East Lansing, Michigan; Bronze 42.7311°N 84.4874°W Terra cotta 42.7281°N 84.4861°W
- Website: Sparty Project

When John Hannah became president of Michigan State College in 1941, he commissioned assistant professor of art Leonard D. Jungwirth to design a statue of an athletic Spartan warrior. Jungwirth sculpted a statue known simply as The Spartan, which soon gained the nickname of "Sparty". Though Jungwirth originally designed The Spartan as a bronze statue, it had to be cast in terra cotta due to World War II rationing of bronze. The terra cotta statue stood on the banks of the Red Cedar River, until 2005, when the university replaced it with a bronze replica. The original Spartan was moved into the stadium, where it remains on display to this day.

=== 1945 terra cotta statue ===
Dedicated on June 9, 1945, the terra cotta Spartan is made of five large glazed terra cotta sections fired from red Ohio clay. These pieces were joined by mortar joints, with a poured concrete core over a steel frame. The statue stands 9’ 7" high and weighs approximately 3,000 pounds. When the statue was erected, popular media claimed that it was the tallest free-standing ceramic sculpture in the world, though that record remains unconfirmed. Though the statue's pose recalls classic Greek sculpture, Jungwirth's stylized design is closer to the mid-20th century modernist design, borrowing heavily from Cubism, Futurism, and depression-era civic art.

=== 2005 bronze statue ===

By the late 20th century, Michigan's harsh winters had taken a toll on the terra cotta statue, as had vandalism by fans of MSU's rival school, the University of Michigan. While annual repair work helped stem the damage done by precipitation, extreme cold, and vandalism, the statue needed more intensive repair.

In 1989, the Save Our Sparty (SOS) campaign helped restore the statue. When they finished, restorers made fiberglass molds of the refurbished "Sparty". New molds were made in 2004, because the 1989 molds had deteriorated, to cast an identical bronze replica that would better stand up to bad weather and vandalism.

The terra cotta Spartan was removed from its base on May 12, 2005. During MSU's 2005 summer semester, the intersection at which the statue stood was completely redesigned to allow for safer traffic interaction with pedestrians. On Thursday, August 25, 2005, an unveiling of the new bronze Spartan took place. In addition, a Sesquicentennial parade on Saturday, October 8, 2005, concluded with a dedication ceremony at the statue. Meanwhile, the original terra cotta Spartan was moved to a new Spartan Stadium annex where it could be displayed safely indoors. Though most members of the MSU community agree that the original statue needs to be sheltered, some alumni and faculty have criticized the inaccessibility of the original statue.

=== Traditions ===
It is tradition for some alumni and other Spartan fans to have a picture taken with the Spartan statue to mark major life events. During graduation season there is a steady stream of recent graduates and their families posing with the statue. On weekends it is not uncommon to see newlywed couples doing the same. During the week before the annual football game against the University of Michigan Wolverines, members of the marching band take turns each guarding the statue against vandalism by fans of the rival school. The tradition is known as "Sparty Watch"; a similar vigil takes place at the Michigan Diag, where the inlaid "M" is defended against MSU fans. During the full team walk from Kellogg Center to Spartan Stadium that takes place prior to each home football game, players and coaches toss or place pennies at the statue as they proceed past it. After the final home football game the Spartan Marching Band circles the statue once before heading home to Adams Field.
