= Mariner Moose =

Professional baseball mascot

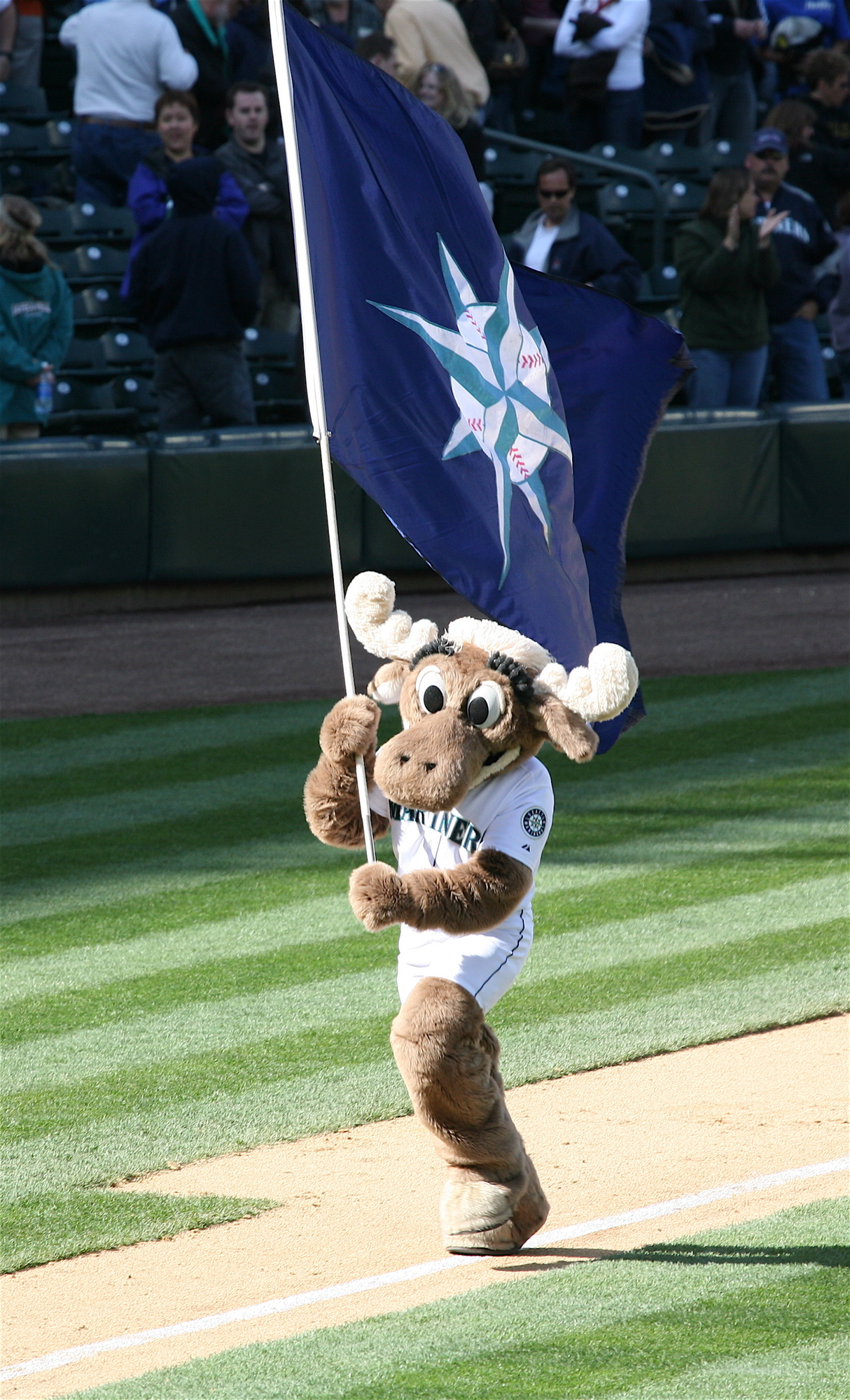
- Team: Seattle Mariners
- Description: Moose
- Origin of name: Children's contest
- First seen: April 13, 1990
- Website: Official Website

The Mariner Moose is the team mascot of the Seattle Mariners, a Major League Baseball team. He is an anthropomorphic moose who mainly appears and performs during Mariners home games at T-Mobile Park; he additionally makes several hundred appearances in the community each year, at everything from hospitals to wedding receptions. His appearance has remained relatively unchanged since his introduction in 1990.

== History ==
While the Mariner Moose was the Mariners' first full-time mascot, the team previously held a mascot competition in 1979 in response to the popularity of the San Diego Chicken. The winner of the competition was "Spacey the Needle," which was a man that wore a hat resembling the top of the Space Needle while on stilts; a man in a diaper took second place. However, Spacey was plagued with mobility issues due to his stilts; the mascot was retired after only a few games. The Chicken itself was a temporary Mariners mascot for six games before the All-Star Game that year; his actions in one game prompted future Mariners manager Lou Piniella, then a New York Yankees player, to throw his glove at him.

In 1990, a contest for children 14 and under was held to select a mascot for the team under then-owner Jeff Smulyan. Out of 2,500 entries received, the club chose the "Mariner Moose," originally submitted by Ammon Spiller of Bellingham, Washington, then a fifth-grader at Central Elementary School in Ferndale; he and his school were each rewarded with a $1,000 check. The runner-up was "Seaward the Sea Monster," proposed by Grant Weaver of Ben Franklin Elementary in Redmond, who received a $500 check as a consolation prize. Spiller and Weaver, along with their families, also received tickets for a Mariners game, as did three other finalists and their families.

The Moose debuted during the Mariners' home opener on April 13, 1990, dancing on the field in front of a sell-out crowd at the Kingdome to the tune of "The Future's So Bright, I Gotta Wear Shades" by Timbuk 3. However, his introduction was not warmly received; Mariners fans repeatedly chanted, "Kill the Moose," during the game. The reception remained very negative throughout the first two months of the season; not even a world record attempt on May 6 for the longest indoor flight could improve the Moose's reputation.

Rollerblading behind an ATV was commonplace for the Moose at the Kingdome, though this performance on the stadium's AstroTurf field resulted in a notorious incident in 1995 (see below). It was a fan favorite until the Mariners moved to T-Mobile Park (then Safeco Field) in 1999 with a natural grass playing surface accompanying the place. Since then, the Moose has driven an ATV around the field's warning track while performing tricks, such as having water coolers emptied on him by bullpen pitchers.

In light of the 1996 United States presidential election, Nike developed a television ad campaign that year entitled "Griffey in '96" wherein Mariners outfielder Ken Griffey Jr. was running for president, with the Moose as his running mate.

In 1997, Brett Rhinehardt, who portrayed the Moose, wrote a letter credited to the Moose opposing the ban on a 15-foot tall fiberglass moose in Mooresville, North Carolina. "Any shopkeeper who adorns their storefront with such a majestic creature should be applauded, not reprimanded," the letter said.

The Mariner Moose was featured on the ballot for the Mascot Hall of Fame in 2006 and 2007.

=== Incidents ===
During the 1995 American League Division Series between the Mariners and the New York Yankees, the Moose gained national attention when, in the middle of the fifth inning in Game 4, he crashed into the outfield wall at the Kingdome while being towed on inline skates behind an ATV in the outfield. Rhinehardt, who portrayed the Moose, suffered a compound fracture of his right ankle as well as a dislocated fibula. Coincidentally, the Mariners' subsequent opponent in the American League Championship Series, the Cleveland Indians, also had their mascot, Slider, suffer an injury with torn knee ligaments in that series. The Moose's skates from the crash are at the Mascot Hall of Fame.

During a Mariners home game against the Boston Red Sox on August 5, 2007, the Mariner Moose was riding his ATV in the middle of the fifth inning when he collided with Coco Crisp, who did not notice the mascot as he was leaving the Red Sox dugout. The Moose's ATV clipped Crisp on the knee. Crisp stumbled briefly but was not angered by the incident despite the ire of some of his teammates; he even played along by feigning retaliation with a fake throw of his glove at the Moose. Mariners general manager Bill Bavasi quickly apologized to Red Sox manager Terry Francona. The Mariner Moose portrayer was not punished for the incident.

== Portrayers ==
The Mariner Moose was first portrayed by Dean N. Greve, who alternated Mariners home games with Tiger Budbill. Budbill soon became the sole Moose, a role he held until the end of the 1994 season. He subsequently worked as a singer and waiter at a restaurant in Kirkland. However, he temporarily resumed the role after the ATV incident in 1995, holding it until the start of the 1996 season, Budbill later competed in season one of the U.S. version of The X Factor.

Brett Rhinehardt took over the portrayal of the Mariner Moose at the beginning of the 1995 season; after sustaining the ankle injury in the ATV crash that season, he attempted to quickly resume his duty by fashioning an old Mariner Moose costume with a cutout for his cast despite the team encouraging him not to rush his recovery. He held the role until the conclusion of the 1998 season, after which he assumed the portrayal of Gnash, the mascot of the Nashville Predators of the National Hockey League. Five other people have portrayed the Moose, though the Mariners do not identify these people.

== See also ==
- List of Major League Baseball mascots
