= KCST-FM =

Radio station in Florence, Oregon

- Florence, Oregon; United States
- Broadcast area: Central Oregon Coast
- Frequency: 106.9 MHz
- Branding: Coast Radio

Programming
- Format: Adult Contemporary
- Affiliations: ABC Radio

Ownership
- Owner: Coast Broadcasting Co., Inc.
- Sister stations: KCFM

History
- First air date: October 1992
- Former call signs: KPVX (7/1992-11/1992)
- Call sign meaning: CoaST

Technical information
- Licensing authority: FCC
- Facility ID: 12139
- Class: A
- ERP: 2,300 watts
- HAAT: 155 meters (509 ft)
- Transmitter coordinates: 43°57′19″N 124°4′26″W

Links
- Public license information: Public file; LMS
- Website: kcfmradio.com

KCST-FM (106.9 FM) is a radio station broadcasting an Adult Contemporary format. Licensed to Florence, Oregon, United States, the station serves the central Oregon Coast. The station is currently owned by Coast Broadcasting Co., Inc. and features programming from ABC Radio . The station also broadcasts local Siuslaw High School and Mapleton Junior/Senior High School sports. KCST is part of the Oregon Sports Network, airing Oregon Ducks Sports.

== History ==
The station went on the air as KPVX on July 30, 1992. On November 16, 1992, the station changed its call sign to the current KCST-FM.

=== Notable Former Staff ===
- Neil Everett, co-anchor of the West Coast edition of ESPN SportsCenter.
- Lawrence "Lonny" Whelchel veteran NW radio broadcaster KPNW-Eugene intern 1976, KZOK-Seattle 1978–79, KTAC-Tacoma 1980, KUBE-Seattle 1982–83, O'Day Broadcasting-Seattle1983, KPAM-Lake Oswego 1984, KCST AM/FM from 1989 till 2001. KKNU Eugene, Or. 2001–04. KFIR 720AM Albany, Or. 2019–2020. Currently owns Sure Hits Productions in Eugene, Or.
