= Neil Everett =

American sportscaster (born 1961/62)

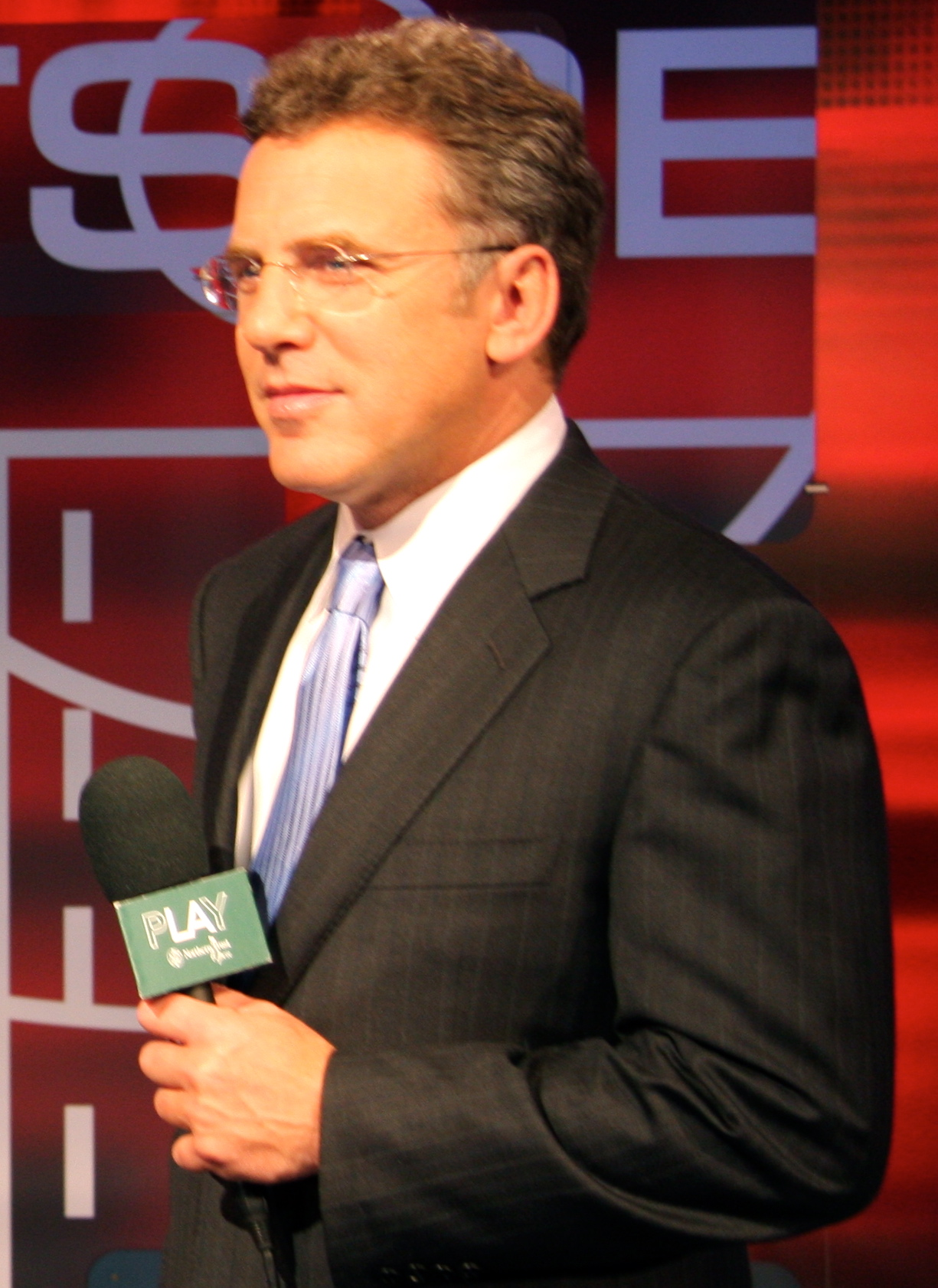
- Everett in 2010
- Born: Neil Everett Morfitt; 1961 or 1962 (age 64–65); Portland, Oregon, U.S.
- Education: University of Oregon
- Occupation: Sportscaster
- Title: SportsCenter Anchor; Television Studio Host for the Portland Trail Blazers

Neil Everett Morfitt (born 1961 or 1962) is an American sportscaster. From 2009 until 2023, he was the co-anchor of the late-night Los Angeles edition of SportsCenter alongside Stan Verrett. He served as the Television Studio Host on the broadcast team of the Portland Trail Blazers for five NBA seasons from 2021 to 2026 with the team.

== Early life and education ==
Everett was born in Portland, Oregon and raised in Spokane, Washington. He was a varsity starter in football and basketball at Lewis and Clark High School, named to the all-city team in football at guard, and also played on the defensive line. He graduated in 1980.

Everett attended Willamette University in Salem before transferring to the University of Oregon in Eugene, where he joined Beta Theta Pi with the Gamma Sigma chapter, and graduated in 1984.

== Career ==
Everett started out in broadcasting at KCST-FM in Florence on the central Oregon Coast, west of Eugene. He left the media field and moved to Hawaii, where he worked 15 years as an athletic administrator at Hawaii Pacific University. While still working full-time at HPU, Everett was hired at local ABC affiliate KITV, first as a news writer, then assignment editor, and finally as a sports anchor.

In April 1999, Everett interviewed with ESPN on the recommendation of a friend, but was not hired. The following year, ESPN called him for another audition, and this time he was hired as an anchor on ESPNews. In March 2009, he relocated to California to co-anchor the late-night Los Angeles edition of SportsCenter alongside Stan Verrett, which debuted on April 6, 2009. He was in this role until June 8, 2023, Everett announced that he was leaving ESPN and SportsCenter after 23 years.

On October 11, 2021, the Portland Trail Blazers announced the addition of Everett to their broadcast team for the 2021-22 season. He served as the Television Studio Host for "pre, half and post-game coverage for most Trail Blazers road games" from 2021 to 2026, according to the Trail Blazers' website. On July 22, 2026, Everett was let go by Portland as a part of mass layoffs within the organization.

== Personal life ==
While he was a student at Oregon in 1983, Everett's mother Jackie, a high school teacher, died from cancer at age 45. The use of his middle name as a professional surname is a tribute to his mother, a UO alumna and Astoria native, who would call him by his first and middle name when his behavior was less than optimal.

Everett's stepfather, Dave Robertson, was a longtime high school basketball coach at Shadle Park and won the state title in 1981, led on the court by Mark Rypien. A math teacher, Robertson later coached at Gonzaga Prep.
