= Stan Verrett =

American sportscaster (born 1966/67)

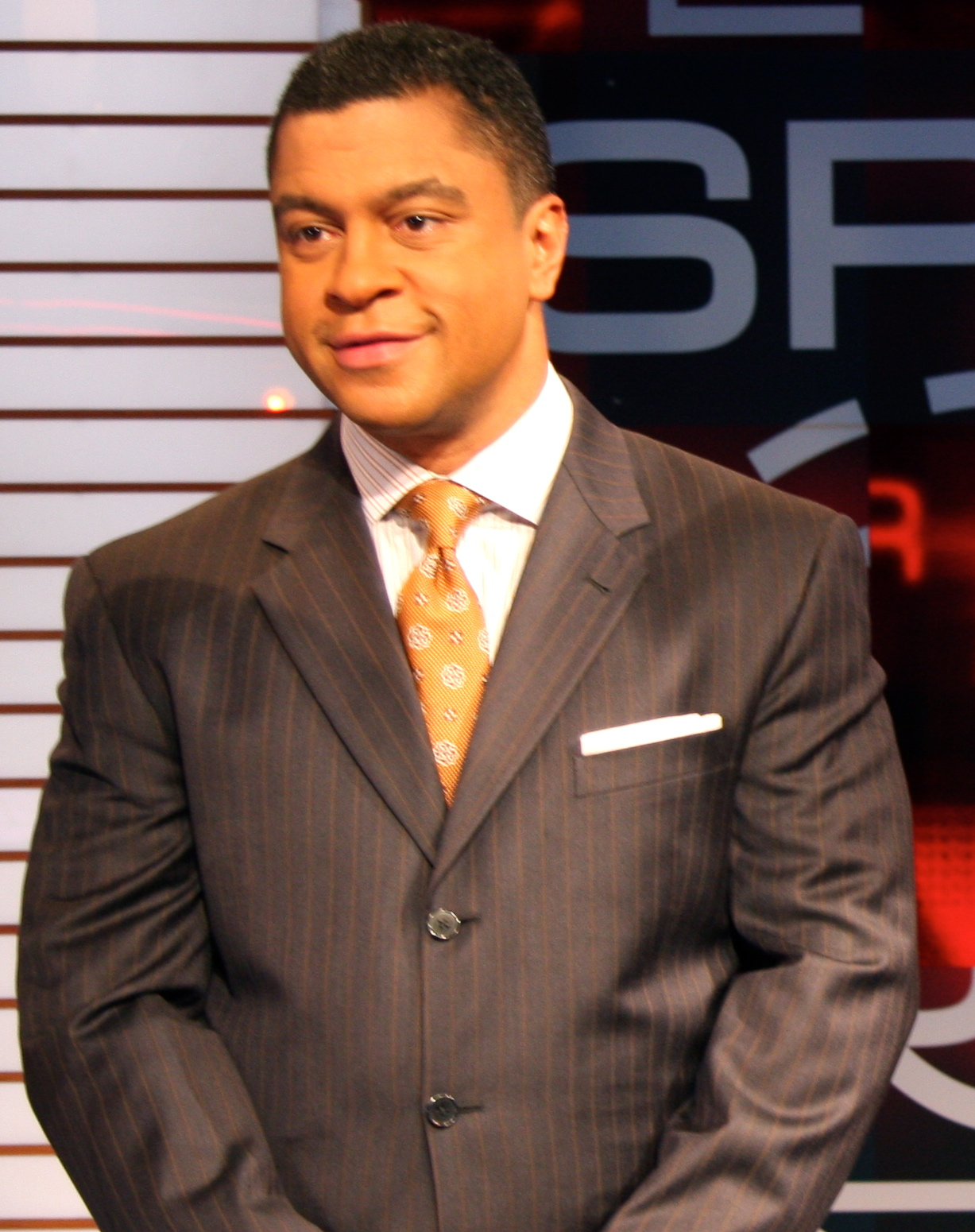
- Verrett in 2010
- Born: 1966 or 1967 (age 59–60)
- Education: Howard University
- Occupation: Sportscaster
- Years active: 1989−present

Stan Verrett (born 1966 or 1967) is an American sportscaster.

== Life and career ==
Verrett attended St. Augustine High School in New Orleans and Howard University in Washington, D.C. Verrett is a member of Alpha Phi Alpha fraternity.

He was a radio DJ on WOWI 103 Jamz in the Hampton Roads, VA area. While in the area, Verrett was a sports anchor on ABC affiliate WVEC-TV 13 and also had a stint on local NBC affiliate WAVY-TV 10.

In April 2009, Verrett began working from ESPN's then-new L.A. Live studios, anchoring the 10:00 p.m. PST SportsCenter along with Neil Everett. In August 2016, he was named studio host for ESPN's college football coverage airing on sister network ABC, replacing John Saunders, who died earlier that month. Verret appeared mostly on the ESPN and ESPNEWS networks. Most of his appearances were on SportsCenter. He has also hosted studio segments on ESPN's college basketball and college football telecasts, and has appeared as a sideline reporter, working ArenaBowl XXII.

On May 22, 2025, Verrett announced his departure from ESPN. Four months later, he joined the Los Angeles Clippers' broadcaster, FanDuel Sports Network SoCal, as host of the pre- and post-game shows. On October 1, 2025, it was announced that Verrett would host a national sports news program, FanDuel Sports Network Countdown Live, beginning October 27.

== Personal life ==
He is the cousin of Jason Verrett.
