= KCFM (AM) =

- Florence, Oregon; United States
- Broadcast area: Central Oregon Coast
- Frequency: 1250 kHz
- Branding: Coast Radio

Programming
- Format: Adult Standards/MOR
- Affiliations: ABC News Radio

Ownership
- Owner: Coast Broadcasting Company
- Sister stations: KCST-FM

History
- First air date: November 28, 1983 (as KGBU)
- Former call signs: KGBU (1983–1988); KCST (1988–2009)
- Call sign meaning: The Coast's Favorite Music

Technical information
- Licensing authority: FCC
- Facility ID: 12138
- Class: D
- Power: 900 watts (day); 37 watts (night)
- Transmitter coordinates: 44°1′45″N 124°5′49″W
- Translators: 103.1 K276IH (Mapleton); 104.1 K281AH (Florence)

Links
- Public license information: Public file; LMS
- Website: kcfmradio.com

KCFM (1250 kHz) is an AM radio station broadcasting an Adult Standards/MOR format. Licensed to Florence, Oregon, United States, the station serves the Central Oregon coast area. The station is currently owned by Coast Broadcasting Company and features programming from ABC News Radio. The station plays entirely locally programmed music from the 1950s, 1960s and 1970s, which appeals to the area's many retirees. The station also airs Oregon State University sporting events through the Beaver Sports Network from Learfield Sports.

== History ==
The station was assigned the call sign KGBU on November 11, 1983. On September 21, 1988, the station changed its call sign to KCST.

=== Low profile antenna ===
In late 2008, KCST was granted a construction permit for the first installation of a low-profile Kintronic Laboratories "KinStar" antenna, which was type-accepted by the Federal Communications Commission in 2005 for broadcast use. This antenna uses a top-loaded design and a full, 120-wire ground radial counterpoise. Construction of the antenna was begun in October 2008 after approval was received from Lane County. The overall height of the antenna system at 70 feet (21.34m) above ground level, just below the local 72 foot (21.95m) height limit, was an aid in securing permit approval and acceptance by nearby residents. Construction of a new transmitter building and installation of transmitting equipment was completed in January 2009. Field intensity measurements of the new antenna indicated that the performance of the installation was comparable to a standard AM broadcast antenna of 200 feet (61m) in height.

On July 13, 2009, the station call letters were changed to KCFM.

== FM translators ==
KCFM is rebroadcast on two FM translators:

- K281AH Florence 104.1
- K276IH Mapleton 103.1
