= Norby Williamson =

American sports TV executive

Norby Williamson (born c. 1963) is an American executive and television producer. He was the Executive Senior Vice President of Studio and Event Production for ESPN. From October 2005 until leaving the company in 2024, Williamson oversaw all studio shows as well as all live sporting events on ESPN networks.

Williamson was born in central Connecticut in the early 1960s. He graduated from Southern Connecticut State University with a bachelor's degree in corporate and video communications. He began his career in the ESPN mailroom in the 1980s.

In 2006, Williamson placed #67 on The Sporting News Power 100.

In September 2017, Williamson became ESPN's executive vice president of studio production. He was formerly critical of Stuart Scott's "Boo-Yah!" catchphrase and once told Bob Ley that his beard looked stupid.

In 2024, Williamson left his position at ESPN after four decades at the company.

In 2025, Williamson was hired to oversee the production of the regional sports networks owned by Main Street Sports Group.
