= Robot Wars: Advanced Destruction =

2001 video game

- Developer: Crawfish Interactive
- Publishers: EU: BBC Multimedia; NA: Vivendi Universal Games
- Platform: Game Boy Advance
- Release: EU: 30 November 2001; NA: 22 November 2002
- Genre: Action
- Modes: Single-player, multiplayer

Robot Wars: Advanced Destruction is the third video game based on the British game show Robot Wars. It was the third of four games based on the show, with the first three selling over 250,000 copies. It was developed by Crawfish Interactive and published by BBC Multimedia and was released exclusively for the Game Boy Advance in 2001. It was also released in the US by Vivendi Universal Games. The game is based on Series 3 & 4 of Robot Wars.

== Gameplay ==
Like the previous game, Robot Wars: Arenas of Destruction, Advanced Destruction features more than one arena to play in. This game features four different arenas, War Zone - which is based on the Series 3 & 4 versions of the Robot Wars Arena, Robot Factory, Steelworks, and Power Station.

In the game, a competitor robot from the series, or a robot created by the player, is entered into combat against a robot controlled by the game. A bout finishes when one robot's health bar is fully depleted or is pitted. In the Championship Mode, the player picks a robot and controls it through seven battles with the first battle being a three-way melee like Series 4.

Multiplayer is also available where up to four players can play.

There were 16 competitor robots in the game including Series champions Chaos 2, Panic Attack, Razer and Tornado.

Like in the other games, series presenter Craig Charles does not appear in the game but the commentator, Jonathan Pearce, appears, but unlike Arenas of Destruction, he does not commentate in the entire battle.

== See also ==
- Robot Wars: Metal Mayhem
- Robot Wars: Extreme Destruction
- BattleBots: Beyond the BattleBox
