= Robot Wars =

Robot Wars may refer to:

== Film and television ==
- Robot Wars (film), 1993
  - Robot Wars (soundtrack)
- Robot Wars (TV series), a British TV competition, 1998–2004 and 2016–2018
  - Nickelodeon Robot Wars, a U.S. TV game show spin-off, 2002
- "Robot Wars", an episode of Zoey 101

== Gaming ==
- Robot Wars: Metal Mayhem, 2000
- Robot Wars: Arenas of Destruction, 2001
- Robot Wars: Advanced Destruction, 2001
- Robot Wars: Extreme Destruction, 2002

== Literature ==
- The Robot Wars, a Judge Dredd storyline
- Robot Wars (book series), a rerelease of Mars Diaries by Sigmund Brouwer

== See also ==
- Robot combat, a mode of robot competition
- RobotWar, a 1981 programming game
- Military robot, designed for military applications
- Super Robot Wars, a video game series
- War Robots, a 2014 video game
