= Robot Wars: Extreme Destruction =

2002 video game

- Developers: Warthog Games (GBA); Climax Development (PC & Xbox)
- Publisher: Gamezlab
- Producers: Sarah Bain; Trevor Jones (GBA)
- Designer: Strangely Brown (GBA)
- Programmer: Will Baker
- Artist: Kate Wright
- Composers: Matthew Simmonds; Semi Precious (GBA)
- Platforms: Game Boy Advance, Microsoft Windows, Xbox
- Release: Game Boy Advance: EU: 25 October 2002; Microsoft Windows & Xbox: EU: 22 November 2002
- Genre: Action
- Modes: Single-player, multiplayer

Robot Wars: Extreme Destruction is an action game developed by Climax Development and published by BBC Multimedia under their game development label Gamezlab in 2002 for the Game Boy Advance, Microsoft Windows and Xbox. It was given a release in the run-up to Christmas to build on the success of the three previous games, which had sold over 250,000 copies.

A separate version of the game was released for the Game Boy Advance which was developed by Warthog Games and was also published by BBC Multimedia under the Gamezlab label in 2002. Despite the same name, the gameplay, arenas and available robots differed greatly between the two versions.

== Gameplay ==
Tornado fighting against fictional robot Tractor in the Robot Wars arena

The player controls a radio-controlled robot which battles it out with other robots in order to win.

In the PC and Xbox versions the main game mode is Competition mode. In this mode the player must either build or buy a robot and compete in various different tournaments. By winning these tournaments, the player earns more money and unlocks new components, robots and arenas. In total there are eight stages, each featuring a different number of tournaments. When all eight stages are completed, the player takes part in the Final Battle, which is an endurance battle against various real-life competitor robots and one House robot entering the arena last.

There are a total of seventeen playable real life competitor robots from the actual Robot Wars televised show including Series champions Chaos 2, Panic Attack, Razer and Tornado. There are also another forty original robots as well.

In the Game Boy Advance version the player must compete in various events to unlock new robots. Every event has the option of choosing bronze, silver, or gold, depending on what level of difficulty the player prefers. Initially, only the bronze level is available and silver and gold must be unlocked. Specific robots are fought against in each difficulty level. Among the events were tournament mode where the player must win four one-on-one battles, Mayhem, where the player must win a four-way melee, Bash N' Dash, where the player must survive against three opponents which are teamed up against the player and Gauntlet mode, in which the player must perform tasks within a time limit. In this version there are seventeen playable real life robots, sixteen of whom must be defeated in order to be unlocked and no original robots.

Craig Charles does not appear in either game, even though he had been the presenter of the series since its second season, but the commentator, Jonathan Pearce, provides commentary on statistics of the battle, the information relative to the arena and a description of the robots competing in the PC and Xbox. Though there is no commentary in the Game Boy Advance version, Jonathan Pearce can be heard calling out "3... 2... 1... Activate!" at the beginning of each match and "Cease!" at the end.

== Development ==
The PC and Xbox versions were developed by Climax Development, a UK studio, consisting of three developers: group development director, Garry Liddon, lead programmer, Will Baker and lead artist, Kate Wright. There were eight other Group developers including composer, Matt Simmonds.

The Game Boy Advance version was developed by Warthog Games, another UK-based video game developer. It was designed by Strangely Brown, composed by Semi Precious and there were also two artists and five programmers developing the game.

== Reception ==
Robot Wars: Extreme Destruction has a GameRankings score of 76.67% for the PC and Xbox versions respectively.

== See also ==
- Robot Wars: Metal Mayhem
- Robot Wars: Arenas of Destruction
- Robot Wars: Advanced Destruction
- BattleBots: Beyond the BattleBox
