= Martin Smith (cyberneticist) =

- Occupations: Professor; television personality
- Employer: Various universities
- Organization(s): Cybernetics Society (UK) (former president) (1999–2020)); World Organisation of Systems and Cybernetics (director)
- Television: Techno Games (technical presenter); Robot Wars (judge); Scrapheap Challenge (judge and technical presenter); Mutant Machines (Technical presenter); Tomorrow's World; Tomorrow's World Live at the NEC; Royal Institution Christmas Lectures
- Awards: Freedom of the City (London); Public Awareness of Physics (Institute of Physics)

Martin Smith is a former Professor of Robotics at Middlesex University in north London, UK. He is also a former President of the Cybernetics Society in the UK (1999–2020).

Smith was awarded Freedom of the City of London, and was awarded the Public Awareness of Physics Award by the Institute of Physics.

== Television appearances ==
Smith has appeared on many television programmes: as a technical presenter on the BBC television programme Techno Games and as a judge on Robot Wars from the third series having previously competed in the first two series. He was a judge and programme consultant on Channel 4's Scrapheap Challenge and technical presenter on Granada TV's Mutant Machines. He has also appeared on Tomorrow's World, Tomorrow's World Live at the NEC, and the Royal Institution Christmas Lectures series entitled The Rise of Robots.

== Editorships ==
Smith is a member of the editorial boards of the following:

- Kybernetes: The International Journal of Cybernetics and Systems,
- The International Journal of Advanced Robotic Systems
- The International Journal of Applied Systemic Studies
- The International Journal of General Systems
- The International Journal of Social Robotics.

He is a Director of the World Organisation of Systems and Cybernetics.

== Former posts ==
He has held posts as Visiting Research Professor in Robotics at the Open University, Professor at the University of Central England UK, (now Birmingham City University) and at the University of East London (UK) where he was founder and Head of the Mobile Robots Research Unit.
