= Fighting robots =

Fighting robots can refer to:

- Military robots
- Robot Fighting League
- Rock 'Em Sock 'Em Robots
- BattleBots
- Robotica

== See also ==
- Robot combat
- Robot Wars (disambiguation)
