= Hypno-Disc =

Combat robot from Robot Wars

- Hypno-Disc at the time of Series 5

Statistics
- Height: 0.47 m (1.5 ft)
- Width: 1.22 m (4.0 ft)
- Depth: 0.74 m (2.4 ft)
- Weight: 100 kg (220 lb)
- Weight class: Heavyweight
- Primary weapon: Flywheel
- Turning circle: 0 m (0 ft)

Team
- Team members: Dave Rose; Derek Rose; Ken Rose
- Location: Middleton Cheney
- Country of origin: United Kingdom

Record
- Wins: 20
- Losses: 10
- Concessions: 1

Hypno-Disc was a contestant entry in the Robot Wars TV series, and was one of the first robots permitted to use the kinetic flywheel weapon. Hypno-Disc's design, however, was somewhat basic, and its high ground clearance made it an easy target for robots armed with flipping weapons, such as Chaos 2. Hypno-Disc was the creation of the Rose family — twin brothers Derek and David, and their father Ken. It was the first competitor robot recreated in toy form when the Robot Wars pullback toys were released.

== Series 3 ==
Hypno-Disc's debut battle was against fellow newcomers Robogeddon. In the battle, Hypno-Disc hit its opponent several times, as the armour started buckling, then coming off completely. Further attacks damaged the wheels and weapon, as well as rupturing its CO_{2} canister, leaving the robot in a huge mess. The wheels were still turning, and the flipping weapon was still functional, but the wheels and tyres were so badly damaged and the chassis so deformed that they couldn't get any traction on the arena floor. Robogeddon couldn't go anywhere, so cease was called, and Hypno-Disc was declared the winner of the battle, putting it through to the second round of the heat, as the rising heat favourites.

In the second round, Hypno-Disc was placed up against another newcomer to the wars in Stealth. Hypno-Disc only began by landing scratches on Stealth's front, but then used a small spot in Matilda's CPZ to turn around and attack Stealth's rear. However, the arena spike caused Hypno-Disc to fly upwards, with its disc ripping Stealth's rear circular saw right off. From then on, all armour panels began to fly off Stealth after every impact from Hypno-Disc's flywheel weapon. Stealth then finally used what life it had left to turn back around again, but still had its flipper gaping open, Hypno-Disc took advantage of this and disabled the flipper completely, before cease was called. This comprehensive victory put Hypno-Disc through to the heat final. Hypno-Disc was then placed up against Berserk 2 in the Heat Final.

Berserk's armour was notably harder than the other two competitors and Hypno-Disc was only able to cause a few minor slices in the rear of Berserk 2. However, about halfway through the bout, Berserk 2 was flipped onto its side by an arena spike. Hypno-Disc righted the machine and went through on a judges' decision. However, there was a real scare for the future runners-up, as Berserk 2 had damaged the disc and Sergeant Bash had caused the robot to have blackouts. To make matters worse, Derek departed for America, leaving Dave and Ken alone to work for four hours straight in order to avoid disqualification. They nearly had to retire from lack of parts and time, but they brought their robot back to life just in time for the Series Semi-Finals.

Hypno-Disc entered the second of the Series Semi-Finals, and was placed up against Evil Weevil in the first round. In this battle, Evil Weevil lacked the agility that Hypno-Disc had, and couldn't bring its weaponry into effect at all. Although Hypno-Disc started tentatively as well. After merely scratching the surface of the armour with the disc, Hypno-Disc soon managed to cause proper damage, After slicing both antennae of Evil Weevil off, Hypno-Disc steered Evil Weevil towards Sir Killalot's CPZ, before it smashed the side of Evil Weevil, managing to break a wheel. Evil Weevil suffered control problems, as it could only turn around in circles after the slam from Hypno-Disc, and the house robots finished the immobile machine. This led to one of the closest battles in Robot Wars, as Hypno-Disc was put through to the second round of the Semi-Final, and was placed up against the experienced 101, this was to fill the final spot in the Grand Final.

In this battle, 101 drove in and pushed Hypno-Disc. 101 managed to stop the blade and drove on top of Hypno-Disc. 101 then reversed into Dead Metal and Hypno-Disc attacked it a few times, before reversing into Dead Metal itself. Hypno-Disc escaped and pushed 101 into Dead Metal. Both robots attacked each other and the fight ended with a pushing match. This was an extremely close match; for the first time ever, the judges emerged from their booth and studied the robots for damage, before eventually making their decision, which went in favour of Hypno-Disc, putting the newcomers through to the Grand Final.

In the Grand Final eliminator, Hypno-Disc was drawn up against original reserves for the Third Wars in Steg-O-Saw-Us. In the battle, Steg-O-Saw-Us drove in immediately and attacked Hypno-Disc's rear. Both bots drove into CPZs, and Hypno-Disc then attacked and ripped Steg-O-Saw-Us' side armour. Steg-O-Saw-Us tried to avoid Hypno-Disc's blade and it rammed it again. Hypno-Disc then rammed the rear of Steg-O-Saw-Us and managed to jam one of its wheels. Dave Rose regards this as the most difficult fight of the series.

Hypno-Disc was subsequently put through to the Grand Final, where it went up against Chaos 2. Chaos 2 had a fast start, circling Hypno-Disc, getting in a good position for a flip. However, Hypno-Disc seemed to be very sluggish and appeared to have control problems, but Chaos 2 decided not to immediately finish the battle and drove away. Chaos 2 then used its flipper unsuccessfully, bouncing and landing on Hypno-Disc's disc, temporarily stopping the disc. Chaos 2 managed to escape without any damage done, however Hypno-Disc was also able to get its disc up to speed again. However, as Hypno-Disc drove over the flame pit, Chaos 2 was able to drive in again and land the final blow, ironically, getting under Hypno-Disc to flip it over onto its back, and win the title. While Chaos 2 then took on the House robots, the defeated Hypno-Disc machine was dragged into the arena corner by Dead Metal, before cease was finally called.

Hypno-Disc won the award for the Most Original Entry that series, which turned out to be the only Robot Wars trophy or award ever given to Hypno-Disc.

== Series 4 ==
Hypno-Disc returned to the Fourth Wars as the number 2 seed. Since Series 3 the team had changed the size and shape of the teeth on the disc; they were now thicker and were designed to grip hold of whole pieces of armour and tear them off, while the old disc did fairly localised damage to tougher armoured robots. Then, they changed the wheels' colour to white, which was used by later designs of the machine. They also fitted in a self righting-mechanism after the final against Chaos 2. The Rose family (and the new disc) did not disappoint, as their first round melee battle, in the final heat of the series, which saw it go up against The Predator and Raizer Blade, was full of action. To begin with, Hypno-Disc hit The Predator's rear three times, ripping off its armour. Raizer Blade lifted Hypno-Disc, but the heat favourites landed back on its wheels. It hit The Predator again, causing the insides to start to fall out and even the battery. At the end of the fight, only Hypno-Disc was moving, but Raizer Blade was put through as well as it sustained less damage. Hypno-Disc's second round battle was against the substitute robot V-Max.

V-Max drove into Hypno-Disc's side, but the 2nd seeds attacked it and ripped off a side panel. Carbon dioxide was leaking from V-Max when Hypno-Disc attacked again. The substitutes lifted Hypno-Disc and pushed it across the arena, but lost its battery when it was rammed by Hypno-Disc again. V-Max was shredded to pieces and Hypno-Disc was through to the heat final, where it was placed up against Raizer Blade once again. After just a few blows from the disc, Hypno-Disc managed to immobilise Raizer Blade, but despite being victorious, they then caused more damage to the defeated machine; breaking off the whole top and side armour of Raizer Blade, this was then before Raizer Blade was ambushed by the house robots, and then flung by the arena floor flipper while Hypno-Disc stayed out of the way. This sent Hypno-Disc through to the Series Semi-Finals once more.

In the Series Semi-Finals, Hypno-Disc was placed up against the unseeded Splinter, in the first round, initiating what would arguably be Hypno-Disc's most famous battle. Splinter decided attack was the best form of defence and used its front scoop to deflect Hypno-Disc's spinning blade. It looked like there would be a major upset when Splinter grabbed hold of the seeded machine from the rear and pushed it into Dead Metal's CPZ, until Hypno-Disc escaped and came back on the attack. The blade created several gashes in the front scoop of Splinter, which seemed to be holding up well. But it then hit the flywheel at an angle, ripping it right from the front and leaving it hanging on by mere threads. Hypno-Disc then tore off the scoop completely before tearing off pieces of armour from the left-hand side. More attacks buckled Splinter's grabbing arms, and shredded the internal areas. Splinter was defeated, putting Hypno-Disc through to the second round, which saw the number 2 seeds get placed up against the number 11 seeds Wild Thing.

In this battle, Wild Thing tried to ram Hypno-Disc's rear, but hit the blade weapon and spun around as a result of the impact. Wild Thing pushed Hypno-Disc's side and rear but Hypno-Disc attacked with its disc, causing some damage to Wild Thing's wheels. However, the 11th seeds kept attacking, and pushed Hypno-Disc into Dead Metal. Wild Thing then lifted Hypno-Disc onto the arena wall before time finally ran out. The battle ended, resulting in a judges' decision, the decision went in favour of Hypno-Disc, putting the number 2 seeds through to the Grand Final once again.

Hypno-Disc was placed up against the number 19 seeds Pussycat in the Grand Final eliminator. Hypno-Disc went in as the favourites, but just one attack from Pussycat's blade damaged one of Hypno-Disc's wheel guards, jamming the wheel and leaving the robot with severe handling problems. Hypno-Disc was eventually pushed into the CPZ by Pussycat, and Shunt put an enormous hole in the disc with its axe, stopping the disc entirely and damaging the robot's gearing. Hypno-Disc was still spinning in circles at the end, yet it was still plucked up by house robot Sir Killalot, and dumped down into the pit of oblivion. This eliminated Hypno-Disc from the competition, and the damage sustained by it prevented it from being able to take part in the playoff battle against the number 30 seeds Stinger. Stinger was awarded third place by default, and Hypno-Disc placed fourth.

== Robot Wars Extreme 1 ==
Hypno-Disc's Mayhem qualifier battle was the Main Event of the second episode of the first series of Extreme, this battle was for a right to fight in the first annihilator of the series. The battle saw Hypno-Disc go up against Wheely Big Cheese and Ming 3. Hypno-Disc convincingly won the battle. It began the battle by tearing one of the wheels of Ming 3, before then putting several gashes into the sides and into the wheels of Wheely Big Cheese. Hypno-Disc dislodged one of Wheely Big Cheese's wheels, before then ripping a wheel clean off Ming 3, before then ripping off the other one. The Refbot then came in, counting out the immobilised Ming 3, and also counting out the limping Wheely Big Cheese, despite one wheel and the flipper still working. Hypno-Disc then held back, watching Ming 3 to be flipped by the arena floor flipper. Hypno-Disc moved in for one more slice at Ming 3, as Wheely Big Cheese tried to flip the wheel-less robot itself. Hypno-Disc then sat and witnessed the demise of Wheely Big Cheese and Ming 3, as both were sent down the pit by the house robots before cease was called. Despite this promising start to the series, Hypno-Disc struggled to make much of an impression in Extreme.

For reaching two previous Grand Finals, Hypno-Disc was entered into the All-Star Tournament in the first series of Extreme. In its first round battle, Hypno-Disc was placed up against Behemoth, and it was favoured to win. In the battle, the disc of Hypno-Disc couldn't cause any more than superficial damage to the World Championship runners-up, while Behemoth managed to push Hypno-Disc around the arena and into CPZs, even managing to avoid damage from the house robots, after they would always attack Behemoth whenever the competitors would enter the CPZs. Hypno-Disc was overturned by Behemoth at one point in the battle, and got to use its srimech arm for the first time at one point in the battle, but it had a mechanical problem late on in the battle, and was pushed, and left on the flame pit by Behemoth. Hypno-Disc was counted out by the Refbot, and cease was immediately called afterwards. This eliminated Hypno-Disc from the competition.

Hypno-Disc returned later on in the series for the Annihilator. It went in, going up against Splinter, Arnold A. Terminegger, Pussycat, Thermidor 2 and X-Terminator. Hypno-Disc was considered one of the favourites to win the whole annihilator, but its performance was similarly disappointing, due to all its competitors ganging up on it. In the first round, Hypno-Disc was immediately flipped by Thermidor 2 before it could get its disc up to speed, and was then continually axed by X-Terminator, Splinter and Arnold A. Terminegger, to prevent the disc getting up to speed at all for the whole battle. Despite this however, Hypno-Disc still scraped through to go through to the next round, due to Thermidor 2 breaking down, and being counted out by the Refbot. In the second round, Hypno-Disc failed once again to get the disc to anywhere near its full speed, and once again it took damage, notably from Arnold A. Terminegger and Sergeant Bash. However, Hypno-Disc had another lucky break when Pussycat knocked X-Terminator's removable link out, immobilising the recent Semi-Finalists. X-Terminator was counted out, flipped by the arena floor flipper, and Hypno-Disc survived to go through once again, although its movement was minimal by the time X-Terminator was fully counted out. Hypno-Disc had so far proved very lucky in the annihilator, however, Hypno-Disc was eliminated in the third round. Although the disc was finally up to speed in this round, just one hit on Arnold A. Terminegger was enough to knock the drive motors out completely, once again. The flywheel was still moving, but the remaining three competitors were given the opportunity to merely press the pit release button and push Hypno-Disc down into the pit of oblivion. After the pit release button was pressed, Pussycat pushed Hypno-Disc down into the pit, eliminating it from the competition, however, Pussycat was pushed in after Hypno-Disc, due to another light nudge from Splinter, although this didn't change the outcome of the battle.

Hypno-Disc also went up against German competitor Nasty Warrior in the UK vs. Germany vengeance battle, in the final episode of Extreme. Despite dominating its opponents, Hypno-Disc still lost the battle. Hypno-Disc was on top for most of the battle, causing considerable surface damage to the German machine, Yet Nasty Warrior kept moving. However, eventually, Hypno-Disc's drives suddenly stopped working. The disc weapon was still spinning, but Hypno-Disc was still counted out by the Refbot, and handed the win to Nasty Warrior. This was thought to be due to a splinter of Nasty Warrior's armour that Hypno-Disc had ripped off and had actually immobilised Hypno-Disc by getting into its system.

Unbeknown to most, Hypno-Disc also took part in a Wild Card Warrior battle in Extreme Series 1, where it went up against TX-108. Hypno-Disc started the battle well, creating a few gashes in the side of its opponent. However, Hypno-Disc suddenly broke down completely, just 30 seconds into the fight. It was counted out by the Refbot, and TX-108 was declared the winner. This made Hypno-Disc become the only veteran to lose to a newcomer in the Wild Card Warrior battles. However, this fight was never aired on television.

Hypno-Disc was also due to fight Razer as part of the People's Challenge during the first series of Extreme, due to both robots being dubbed as "the most destructive robot ever". However, as both teams did not want to risk their robot being badly damaged purely for the sake of entertainment, both teams declined, and the event never took place.

== Series 5 ==
Hypno-Disc returned for the Fifth Wars as the number 3 seed. Hypno-Disc's first fight of the Fifth Wars saw it go up against a 200 kg walkerbot called Black Widow. In the battle, after slowly seeking the spider based robot out, the flywheel weapon of Hypno-Disc tore several of the many legs off. The disc also became coated in fake webbing before Black Widow's mobility completely ceased, however the disc didn't slow at all. The Refbot eventually came in and counted out Black Widow, with its axe still swinging, and Hypno-Disc therefore advanced to the second round. In the second round of the heat, for the first and only time in Robot Wars history, the two seeds of a heat fought each other before the heat final, as the number 3 seeds Hypno-Disc was placed up against the number 22 seeds Atomic.

In this battle, Hypno-Disc was flipped over once by the previous heat finalists, before Hypno-Disc righted itself with the center mounted self-righting arm. Hypno-Disc then began to start performing as it tore off its opponent's weapon almost completely and put several gashes down the side too, Atomic 2 was immobilised, counted out by Refbot and Hypno-Disc went through to the heat final.

In the Heat Final, Hypno-Disc was placed up against the unseeded Bulldog Breed 3. In this battle, Bulldog Breed 3 was able to flip Hypno-Disc once, almost onto its back, but Hypno-Disc recovered and came back on the offensive. After a lot of slices into the Bulldog's outer shell, Hypno-Disc managed to rip out its safety link, immobilising it instantly. Rather than continue to attack the defenseless opponent, however, the Rose family pitted Bulldog Breed 3 to spare it damage from the house robots, and Hypno-Disc was put through to the Series Semi-Finals once more. This occasion was the first ever time that Hypno-Disc rammed an opponent down into the pit of oblivion.

In the first round of the Semi-Finals, it was placed up against the number 7 seeds Firestorm 3. In this battle, the two competitors circled each other without contact, but then Hypno-Disc moved in for a slice at the side of Firestorm 3. After just one hit from the flywheel, Firestorm 3 rolled over to the other side of the arena, with everything suddenly not working. Firestorm 3 was then counted out by the Refbot, and subsequently pitted by the House Robots, putting Hypno-Disc through to the next round of the Semi-Finals.

In the second round, Hypno-Disc was placed up against the number 11 seeds Dominator 2. Hypno-Disc managed to hit one of the wheels, immobilising Dominator 2 on one side. After a couple more light slams down the side of Dominator 2, the Rose boys held back their machine to avoid sustaining damage and Dominator 2's axe was still coming down, Hypno-Disc left Dominator 2 to be counted out. However, Dominator 2 was not counted out and the match ran down to a judges' decision, with Hypno-Disc merely sitting back waiting for time to run out. The crowd didn't like this and the judges described it as the most boring battle they had ever seen. Nonetheless, Hypno-Disc had earned its place in the Grand Final for the third time in succession.

In the Grand Final eliminator, Hypno-Disc was placed up against the unseeded Bigger Brother machine. Hypno-Disc completely dominated the battle, causing severe damage to Bigger Brother and destroying their flipper. Despite this, Bigger Brother kept moving. However, the battle suddenly turned when Bigger Brother went for the pit release button, as Hypno-Disc attempted to block and pressed it themselves. Hypno-Disc then remained fairly stationary, allowing Bigger Brother to then push Hypno-Disc onto the edge of the pit of oblivion, before then pushing the seeded machine in. This proved to be one of the greatest shocks in Robot Wars history.

Hypno-Disc was then only able to fight for third place, and this time, it was able to fight. In the playoff battle, many saw this as a rematch, as Hypno-Disc went up against Firestorm 3 once again. In this battle, the two competitors pushed each other around as Firestorm 3's flipper had been broken by Razer in their previous fight. Firestorm and Hypno-Disc both drove into the pit at the same time. The Judges called for a rematch, but Hypno-Disc had suffered technical problems; the disc and srimech were both working, but the drive motors were immobile and couldn't continue fighting. This meant that Firestorm 3 won the battle and came third by default, also meaning that Hypno-Disc finished 4th for the second time in succession.

== Series 6 ==
Hypno-Disc slipped another place to a ranking of number 4 as it returned for the Sixth Wars. In its first round melee, Hypno-Disc was placed up against 4x4, Granny's Revenge 2 and Barber-Ous 2. In the battle, 4x4's snagging cloth was unsuccessful in preventing Barber-Ous 2 and Hypno-Disc from doing damage with their blades, before long, 4x4 was immobilised, up against the angle grinder. Granny's Revenge 2 was set alight by house robot Sergeant Bash and destroyed by Hypno-Disc before it was counted out by the Refbot. Hypno-Disc then launched attacks on Barber-Ous 2, stopping the red and white machine in its tracks too, leaving Hypno-Disc as the last competitor standing. 4x4 and Granny's Revenge 2 had already been counted out, so Barber-Ous 2 went through with Hypno-Disc to the next round of the heat.

The second round saw a re-match of the Series 5 Heat B Final as Hypno-Disc was placed up against Bulldog Breed. In this battle, Bulldog Breed put up another valiant fight, almost flipping Hypno-Disc straight away, with only the disc keeping the seed on its wheels. However, after a few attacks, the number 4 seed left gashes in both side panels of Bulldog Breed and it lost drive to one side meaning it was counted out by Refbot. This put Hypno-Disc through to the heat final, where it was placed up against Barber-Ous 2 once again.

In this battle, Barber-Ous 2 was immobilised by the very first hit from the horizontal spinning disc of the three times grand finalist. Hypno-Disc continued to attack Barber-Ous 2, slowly edging it towards the pit, until it left several gashes in its opponent's plastic armoury, then, Hypno-Disc left the immobilised machine hanging over the open pit as Refbot counted it out, sending Hypno-Disc through to the Series Semi-Finals for the fourth time in succession. This proved to be Hypno-Disc's final victory in Robot Wars, as an unsuccessful run of battles followed.

Hypno-Disc was drawn up against the number 12 seeds Tornado in the first round of the Series Semi-Finals. As the disc weapon of Hypno-Disc couldn't make much impression on Tornado's armour, the two competitors spent the duration of the battle pushing each other around. However, Tornado had the pushing advantage, and controlled most of the battle. Hypno-Disc avoided the pit of oblivion several times during the battle, and held on to a judges' decision, but this control was not enough to prevent Tornado from taking a unanimous judges' decision. Meaning that Hypno-Disc was the loser's melee away from being eliminated from the competition, at such an early stage for the machine.

In this loser's melee, Hypno-Disc was placed up against the number 2 seeds Bigger Brother, the robot that defeated Hypno-Disc in the last series, and the number 10 seeds Spawn Again. In the battle, Hypno-Disc started aggressively, causing damage to both of its opponents, however its flywheel weapon hit the arena side wall after the robot ricocheted off Spawn Again, and the whole machine suddenly stopped completely. Hypno-Disc was later counted out by Refbot, just as Bigger Brother pitted the similarly immobilised Spawn Again, eliminating Hypno-Disc from the competition for good, marking the first time in four attempts that this robot failed to reach the Grand Final of the main competition.

== Robot Wars Extreme 2 ==
In the All-Stars Tournament for the series, Hypno-Disc was placed up against two robots it had fought before, Spawn Again and Dominator 2 in the first round. Hypno-Disc began the battle by slicing at Dominator 2, but it merely bounced off and not causing any visible damage. Then Spawn Again threw Hypno-Disc into the air, but then retreated to then slam Dominator 2 again, before being flipped by Spawn Again again. It then landed numerous blows on Dominator 2, but every time it just bounced off the bi-wedge shaped robot. The three robots met in the centre of the arena and suddenly Hypno-Disc conked out and its disc slowly ground to a halt. Spawn Again then flipped Hypno-Disc over and the Refbot counted it out, Hypno-Disc was then left to be pitted by house robot Growler, eliminating Hypno-Disc from the competition.

Hypno-Disc also took part in the Extreme Series 2 Challenge Belt Special to claim the right to face Tornado for the Challenge Belt at the end of the program. In its first round four-way melee, Hypno-Disc didn't last long, going up against twice heat-finalist S.M.I.D.S.Y., recent semi-finalist Dantomkia and Sir Chromalot. Hypno-Disc got one slice on S.M.I.D.S.Y. where it spun itself away without causing any damage, before Dantomkia charged into Hypno-Disc and pushed it into the CPZ and flipped it onto its back, propped onto the arena side wall, from which it couldn't move at all, or even use its srimech. Mr. Psycho tried to come in and attack Dantomkia, but couldn't move forward. This gave Dantomkia the opportunity to flip Hypno-Disc out of the arena, and it did so, just as the disc was spinning up to full speed. This eliminated Hypno-Disc from the competition; this was also Hypno-Disc's final televised battle.

== Appearances in merchandise ==
Hypno-Disc has appeared as a toy three times, as a pullback, pitstop and minibot. Hypno-Disc has also appeared in four of the five Robot Wars video games, appearing in Arenas of Destruction, Advanced Destruction and both versions of Extreme Destruction.

Preceded by Milly-Ann Bug	UK Robot Wars; Most Original Entry (Series 3)	Succeeded by Gemini
