= Techno Games =

British television series

- Genre: Robot competition
- Presented by: Ulrika Jonsson (2000); Jayne Middlemiss (2001); Philippa Forrester (2002–2003)
- Starring: Ed Hall (2000–2001); Sophie Blake (2000); Julia Reed (2001); Simon Scott (2002–2003); Andy Collins (2002); Liz Bonnin (2003)
- Judges: Noel Sharkey; Martin Smith
- Voices of: Barry Davies
- Country of origin: United Kingdom
- Original language: English
- No. of series: 4
- No. of episodes: 35

Production
- Running time: 45 minutes
- Production companies: TV21 (2000–2001); Mentorn (2002–2003)

Original release
- Network: BBC Two
- Release: 20 March 2000 – 28 March 2003

Techno Games is a robot competition television programme that aired on BBC Two from 20 March 2000 to 28 March 2003. It is a spin-off from the hugely successful Robot Wars.

== Format ==
Schools, colleges, individuals and technology clubs competed to break world records, win medals and the grand series prize. For most events lifelike movement was required, so, for example, in the swimming event propellers were banned in favour of legs, paddles, flippers and fins.

== Events ==
Not all the events appeared in all of the series, some have also appeared on the first 4 series of Robot Wars and on the Robot Wars videogames too.

- Assault Course (also appeared on the Microsoft Windows & PlayStation 2 versions of Robot Wars: Arenas of Destruction and the Microsoft Windows & Xbox versions of Robot Wars: Extreme Destruction)
- Cycling
- Football (previously appeared on Robot Wars and also appeared on the Microsoft Windows & Xbox versions of Robot Wars: Extreme Destruction)
- Gymnastics
- High Jump
- Long Jump (also appeared on the Game Boy Advance version of Robot Wars: Extreme Destruction)
- Micromouse (Wall following)
- Micromouse (Maze solving)
- Relay Cars (previously appeared on Robot Wars as Stock Car)
- Rocket Cars and Funny Cars (previously appeared on Robot Wars as Stock Car)
- Solar Challenge Cars (previously appeared on Robot Wars as Stock Car)
- Tug-of-War (previously appeared on Robot Wars)
- Rocketry (Spot landing and Egg Protection)
- Rope Climbing (Natural movement-arms and legs)
- Rope Climbing (Artificial movement-wheels and rollers)
- Sprint (Two, three, four, six and eight legged walkers)
- Sumo (previously appeared on Robot Wars and also appeared on the Game Boy Advance, Microsoft Windows & Xbox versions of Robot Wars: Extreme Destruction)
- Swimming
- Water Polo
- Outdoor Events (Penalty kick, Shot Put)

== Transmissions ==
Series	Start date	End date	Episodes
1	20 March 2000	24 March 2000	5
2	5 March 2001	16 March 2001	10
3	18 March 2002	29 March 2002	10
4	17 March 2003	28 March 2003	10
