= Julia Reed (television presenter) =

British television presenter

Julia Reed is a British television presenter.

Reed is best known as the co-presenter of the game show Robot Wars from 2000 to 2002. She took over the role from Philippa Forrester since Forrester was unable to participate in the programme due to pregnancy. Her role on the show was as the pit reporter who would speak to contestants about their robots before and after battles. In 2002, Forrester returned to the role.

Reed was also a reporter in the second series of the Robot Wars spin-off Techno Games in 2001. The show was presented by Jayne Middlemiss and would later be presented by Philippa Forrester, both of whom, like Reed, served as Robot Wars pit reporters.

Reed also hosted the interactive video games series Blam!!! in 2000, the Sky One game show Hi-Score in 2001, and the Channel 4 science programme SuperHuman in 2004.

Reed is a former Hampshire Under-18 fencing champion and she holds a first-class degree in psychology.
