= Action Soccer =

1995 video game

- Publisher: Ubisoft
- Platform: MS-DOS
- Release: 1995
- Genre: Sports
- Modes: Single-player, multiplayer

Action Soccer is an association football video game from Ubisoft.

== Gameplay ==
Action Soccer offers single-player and two-player modes, including tournaments for up to eight players. Players can choose between different weather conditions—rain, snow, or sunshine—which affect gameplay. The game features humorous and eccentric commentary by Jonathan Pearce. Controls are simple, and the game can be played in 3D isometric or side-view mode.

== Reception ==
Reception

Review scores
Publication	Score
Computer and Video Games	73%
Evening Post	60%
PC Joker	78%
PC Player	82%
Power Play	78%

Computer and Video Games said "12 months ago, this may have been worth it, but there's plenty of excellent stuff on the way very soon".
