= Noel Sharkey =

British computer scientist and TV personality (born 1948)

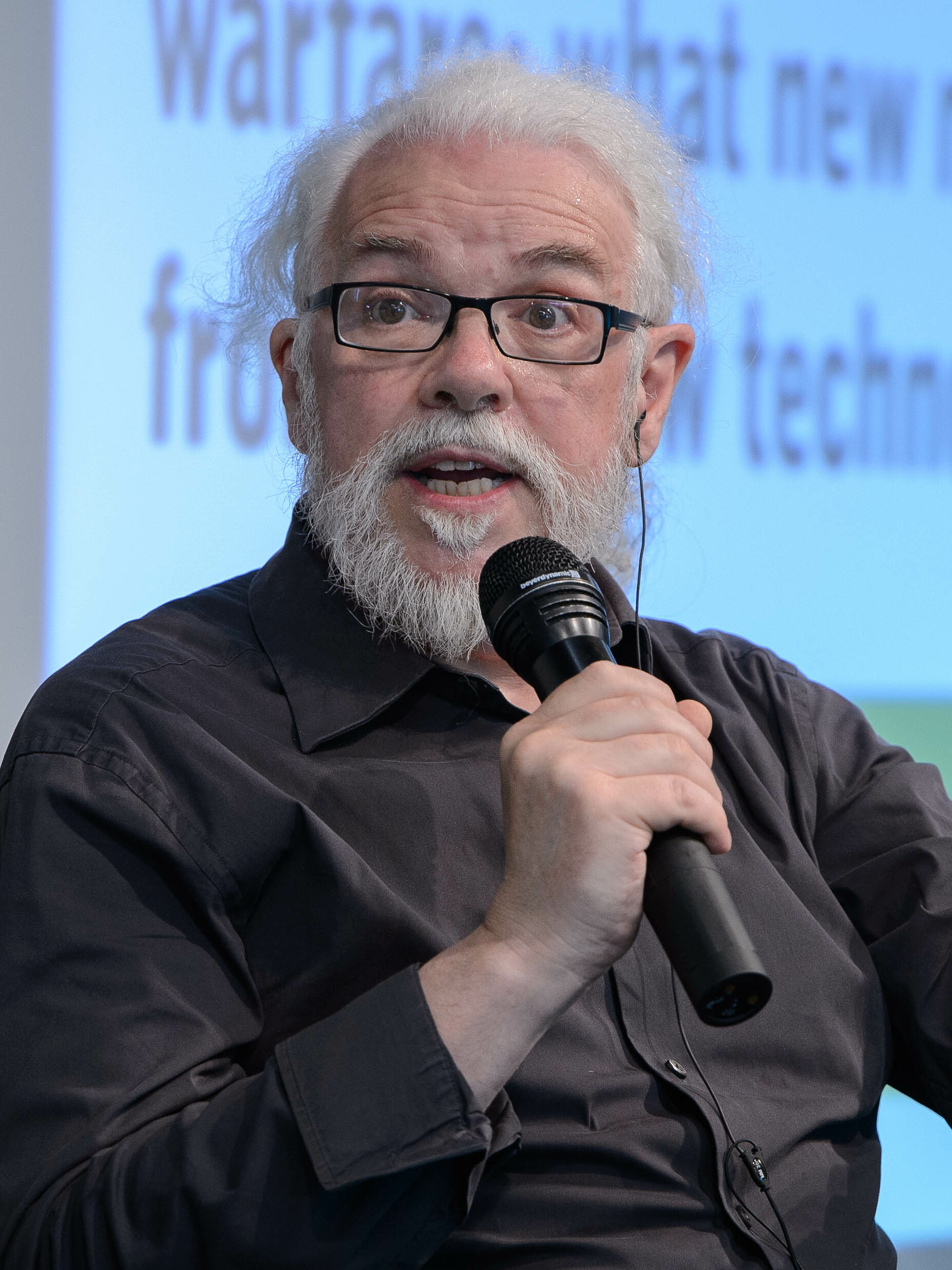
- Sharkey in 2013
- Born: 14 December 1948 (age 77)
- Awards: FBCS; FIET; FRSA
- Scientific career
- Fields: Computer Science, Robotics
- Workplaces: University of Sheffield
- Website: noelsharkey.com

Noel Sharkey (born 14 December 1948) is a computer scientist born in Belfast, Northern Ireland. He is best known to the British public for his appearances on television as an expert on robotics; including the BBC Two television series Robot Wars and Techno Games, and co-hosting Bright Sparks for BBC Northern Ireland. He is emeritus professor of artificial intelligence and robotics at the University of Sheffield.

Sharkey chairs the International Committee for Robot Arms Control, an NGO that is seeking an International treaty to prohibit the development and use of autonomous robot weapons – weapons that once launched can select human targets and kill them without human intervention. He is co-founder and co-director of the Foundation for Responsible Robotics.

Sharkey is the founding editor of the academic journal Connection Science, and an editor for Artificial Intelligence Review and Robotics and Autonomous Systems.

== Career ==
Sharkey held a chair in the Department of Computer Science (from 1994) at the University of Sheffield, and then he was a professor of Artificial Intelligence and Robotics and a professor of Public Engagement. He was supported by an EPSRC Senior Media Fellowship and a Leverhulme Fellowship of the ethics of battlefield robots.

Previously Sharkey held a number of interdisciplinary research and teaching positions in the US (Yale Computer Science and Stanford Psychology) and the UK (Essex Language and Linguistics, Exeter Computer Science). He was director of the Centre for Cognitive Science at University of Essex and Director of the Centre for Connection Science at the University of Sheffield.

He holds a doctorate in psychology, a doctorate in science, is a chartered electrical engineer, a chartered information technology professional, a Fellow of the Institution of Engineering and Technology (FIET), a fellow of the British Computer Society, a fellow of the Royal Institute of Navigation and Fellow of the Royal Society of Arts (FRSA).

In 2014 Sharkey received an honorary doctorate in Informatics from the University of Skövde, Sweden.

=== Academic contributions ===
In the academic world, Sharkey is best known for his contribution to machine learning and cognitive science with more than 150 scientific articles and books.

Since 2006, Sharkey has written and spoken widely concerning the ethical responsibilities of governments and international organisations in a world where robotics applications are dramatically increasing, both in the military and policing contexts. He has also written widely on the ethical danger and societal impact of robotics in childcare, elder care, surgery, medicine, transport, and sex.

=== Media ===
Sharkey appeared as an expert on all four series of the BBC Two television Techno Games. and as head judge of every televised series of Robot Wars throughout the world (1998–2003) and again as head judge in the later Robot Wars reboot on BBC Two (2016). He co-hosted Bright Sparks, a science and engineering challenge series, for BBC Northern Ireland, and produces and presents a weekly radio show for the community radio station Sheffield Live! called The Sound of Science.

Sharkey has set up and organised robot competitions for young people around the world, including the national Chinese creative robotics contest, and the national Egyptian schools AI and robotics contest.

Apart from Sharkey's work on popular TV he is also regularly interviewed for radio, magazines, TV and newspapers about issues concerned with the responsible use of robots and Artificial Intelligence. Sharkey's interview on BBC Radio 4's The Life Scientific provides insight into his life story. He also writes for newspapers, magazines and news sites.

== Personal life ==
Sharkey resides in Sheffield with his wife Amanda and has five daughters.
