= Sethu Vijayakumar =

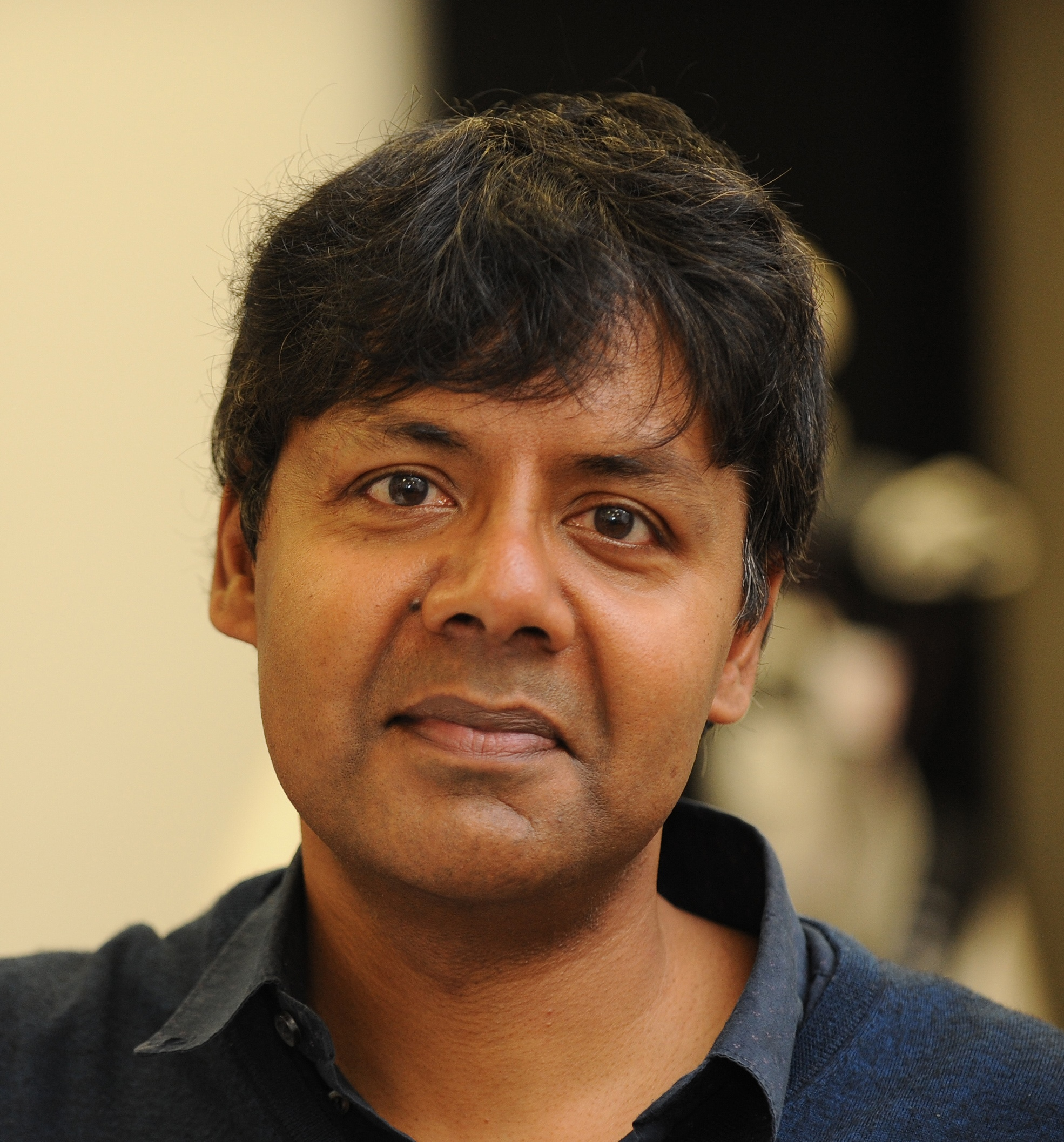
Professor Sethu Vijayakumar FRSE

Sethu Vijayakumar (born 1970) is Professor of Robotics at the University of Edinburgh and a judge on the BBC2 show Robot Wars. He is the programme co-director for Artificial Intelligence at The Alan Turing Institute, the UK's National Institute for Data Science and Artificial Intelligence, with the responsibility for defining and driving the institute's Robotics and Autonomous Systems agenda. He co-founded the Edinburgh Centre for Robotics in 2015 and was instrumental in bringing the first NASA Valkyrie humanoid robot out of the United States of America, and to Europe, where is it a focus of research at the School of Informatics. He was elected as a Fellow of the Royal Society of Edinburgh in 2013.

Vijayakumar's articles on Incremental Online Learning in high dimensions, Natural Actor-Critic and other robot learning related publications have been cited over 10000 times in academic papers and he is the recipient of the IEEE Transactions of Robotics (IEEE-TRO) King-Sun Fu Memorial Best Paper Award 2013.

== Career ==
After a PhD in computer science and engineering from the Tokyo Institute of Technology, during which he also worked as a research scientist at the Kawato Dynamic Brain Project in ATR, Kyoto, Vijayakumar became a postdoctoral fellow in the Laboratory for Information Synthesis, RIKEN Brain Science Institute, Saitama, Japan working with Professor Shun'ichi Amari. He then headed to the University of Southern California as a presidential postdoctoral fellow with Professor Stefan Schaal and subsequently became a research assistant professor (2001–2003) in the Department of Computer Science at USC, Los Angeles.

In 2003, he moved to the University of Edinburgh, where he went on to become director of the Institute for Perception, Action and Behaviour in the School of Informatics and then Co-director of Edinburgh Centre for Robotics.

In 2007 Vijayakumar was awarded a Royal Academy of Engineering Senior Research Fellowship in Learning Robotics, co-funded by Microsoft Research. He is a Turing Fellow since 2018 and a Fellow of the European Laboratory on Learning and Intelligent Systems (ELLIS) since its inception in 2020.

== Public engagement with science ==
Vijayakumar is an active science communicator, giving public talks and media interviews. In 2015 the University of Edinburgh awarded him its annual Tam Dalyell Prize for Excellence in Engaging the Public with Science and in 2016 he presented a series of robot demonstrations at the television launch of BBC micro:bit live lessons. He featured in Stargazing Live with Dara O Briain, March 2017. He was a judge on the 2016-2018 revival of the robot combat TV show Robot Wars. Vijayakumar also delivered two TEDx talks on robotics and machine learning at TEDx Glasgow 2018 and TEDx Edinburgh 2015.
