= Myra Wilson =

British computer scientist

- Known for: Robot Wars

Academic background
- Education: Aberdeen University; University of Edinburgh

Academic work
- Discipline: Computer scientist
- Sub-discipline: Robotics
- Institutions: Aberystwyth University

Myra S. Wilson is a British computer scientist. She is a senior lecturer in computer science at Aberystwyth University, Wales. Her research interests are in the broad area of robotics, and she also teaches in the field.

== Education and research ==
Myra S. Wilson received the B.Sc. degree from Aberdeen University, Aberdeen, U.K., and the Ph.D. degree in computer science from the University of Edinburgh, Scotland, UK.

She heads the Intelligent Robotics Group, as well as the Biologically Inspired Robotics Network (biro-net). Her interests include adaptive robotics and biologically inspired systems.

== Media work ==
She was a judge on the BBC television robot combat programme Robot Wars for the fourth and fifth series in 2000–2001.

== Selected publications ==
- Walker, Joanne, Simon Garrett, and Myra Wilson. "Evolving controllers for real robots: A survey of the literature." Adaptive Behavior 11.3 (2003): 179-203.
- J. H. Walker, S. M. Garrett and M. S. Wilson, "The balance between initial training and lifelong adaptation in evolving robot controllers," in IEEE Transactions on Systems, Man, and Cybernetics - Part B: Cybernetics, vol. 36, no. 2, pp. 423–432, April 2006, doi: 10.1109/TSMCB.2005.859082.
- Giagkos, Alexandros, and Myra S. Wilson. "BeeIP: Bee-inspired protocol for routing in mobile ad-hoc networks." International Conference on Simulation of Adaptive Behavior. Springer, Berlin, Heidelberg, 2010.
- Burbidge, Robert, and Myra S. Wilson. "Vector-valued function estimation by grammatical evolution for autonomous robot control." Information Sciences 258 (2014): 182-199.
- Giagkos, Alexandros, et al. "UAV flight coordination for communication networks: genetic algorithms versus game theory." Soft computing 25.14 (2021): 9483-9503.
