= Robot Wars: Arenas of Destruction =

2001 video game

ROBOT WARS: Arenas of Destruction
- Developer: Climax Development
- Publishers: EU: BBC Multimedia; NA: Vivendi Universal Games
- Producer: Barry Simpson
- Designer: Mark Davies
- Programmer: Ben Potton
- Artist: Matt Cooper
- Composer: Matt Lightwood
- Platforms: PlayStation 2, Microsoft Windows
- Release: PlayStation 2: EU: 22 November 2001; Windows: EU: 23 November 2001; NA: 22 October 2002
- Genre: Action
- Modes: Single-player, multiplayer

Robot Wars: Arenas Of Destruction is a 2001 action game published by BBC Multimedia and released for the PlayStation 2 and Microsoft Windows, based on the BBC television series, Robot Wars. It was the first of the company's titles to be released under the "Gamezlab" core brand.

In this game, players can fight as their own created robots, or leading robots from the series, such as Razer, in arenas around the world in order to earn money to unlock new levels and buy better robots and parts.

== Gameplay ==
A battle between Hypno-Disc and Thor in Siberia Military Base

The player begins the game with 2000 credits and a robot called "My First Bot". The player is then advised to sell this robot and buy a new one, with a profit or 1350 credits from the old robot. A range of parts, armor, weapons and extras can be bought at different prices in the shop, or a smaller range at the scrapyard. The games system controls are highly customizable with a wide range of features for the ultimate personal robot experience.

The player fights robots in championships around the world, starting at Robot Wars London studio, in order to gain prize money to unlock new levels. In the later tournaments, they need to pay money in order to go into the tournament.

The House Robots cannot be played as, won, or bought by the player, but can be pitted-against them in a one-to-one training confrontation. The RefBot is not included in this largely-Series 4 based game, but appears in the subsequent title Extreme Destruction.

Craig Charles does not appear in the game, even though he had been the presenter of the series since its second series, but the show's commentator, Jonathan Pearce, provides commentary on statistics of the battle, the information relative to the arena and a description of the robots competing.

In the game there is a total of 57 custom built robots (including My First Bot) to use in competition and arcade mode. Only 4 out of 57 of these are capable of self righting. There are only a handful of competitor robots that actually appeared in the televised series, including Razer, Chaos 2 and Hypno-Disc.

== Reception ==
Reception

Aggregate score
Aggregator	Score	
Aggregator	PC	PS2
GameRankings	41.00%	50.50%

Review score
Publication	Score	
Publication	PC	PS2
Computer and Video Games	5.6/10	N/A

Robot Wars: Arenas Of Destruction received mixed to negative reviews. It has a GameRankings score of 41.00% and 50.50% for the PC and PlayStation 2 versions respectively. CVG awarded the game 56 out of 100, citing unresponsive controls and lack of difficulty as the reasons for the low score.
