= Panic Attack (robot) =

Robot that appeared on television show Robot Wars

Statistics
- Height: 0.33 m (1.1 ft)
- Width: 1.36 m (4.5 ft)
- Depth: 0.93 m (3.1 ft)
- Weight: 99 kg (218 lb)
- Weight class: Heavyweight
- Primary weapon: Lifting forks
- Maximum speed: 12 mph (19 km/h)
- Turning circle: 0 m (0 ft)
- Ground clearance: 0 mm (0 in)
- Power source: 750W motor

Team
- Team members: Kim Davies; Michael Davies
- Location: Cwmbran, Wales
- Country of origin: United Kingdom

Panic Attack was a robot that competed in the British television show Robot Wars. In Series 2, first broadcast in late 1998, it was just a box with a set of electrically powered lifting forks, powered by a homemade system. It was emblazoned with the image of a spider. The spider was the result of a school competition to come up with a design of something that made you panic. A 12-year-old girl designed the spider. With his prize money from Series 2, Kim built a newer machine. This one had a srimech (self-righting mechanism), a new body shape, and more effective forks, which were capable of completely overturning opposing machines. The top-mounted self-righting mechanism proved to be unreliable, and was eventually removed. Added in Series 4 were a set of side "skirts" to prevent all but the lowest of robots from getting underneath it, as well as sloping sides. The fourth model had improved skirts, and the srimech was updated to a top flipper, which was the favourite with the driver Kim Davies, who stated it was, in his opinion, the best version.

Panic Attack was constructed in Cwmbran, Wales.

The Series 6 version was flatter, with silver forks and painted gold as opposed to yellow, as the team had run out of yellow paint when the time came to paint it. As a result, this model was unofficially, but universally nicknamed Panic Attack Gold. For Series 7, the fourth model was reused, with the addition of a rear skirt, and with the srimech being replaced by an anti-hammer cushioned top.

The robot competed in Series 2-7 of Robot Wars, winning the second series and making the semi-finals in three other wars. It also won the "Sumo Basho" competition in Series 4, meaning that it was the only machine to defeat Shunt in this event twice. Panic Attack was one of the longest appearing robots, appearing in six wars and two extremes. Although the only grand champion never to reach another Grand Final, Panic Attack reached the most semi-finals of all Grand Champions at four.

Panic Attack's signature move was to slip beneath a robot, using its forks to get a grip inside the opponent's armour, wheels or other openings, before driving into the pit release button and pushing it down the pit. It achieved this many times, against robots like Axe Awe, S.M.I.D.S.Y., Manta and Kat 3.

The team also entered Panic Attack in one season of Battlebots, losing out to Frenzy. They returned next season with Scallywag, a wedge-shaped lifter with a colour scheme similar to Panic Attack.

As champion of Series 2 and a good contestant in later wars, Panic Attack was one of the competitor robots immortalized in plastic when the Robot Wars toys were released. A 'Minibot' toy plus a working pullback with flipping spikes and a 'Pitstop' toy were released.

Panic Attack could be the bravest robot in the series as it would tackle the house robots when it found a chance to, especially Shunt who became a rival of sorts to Panic Attack. It also had a rivalry with Firestorm, who dethroned it of its champion status in Series 3 and the two fought four more times over the years, though Panic Attack was never able to beat Firestorm in a true fight, and the only win against Firestorm it got was from their last brawl when Firestorm unwittingly drove into the Pit.

== Team Members ==
The team captain of the robot was Kim Davies, who was originally joined by Kevin Pritchard and Lee Witcombe. In Series 3, Pritchard left the team to create a similar robot named Evil Weevil and Davies was joined by his son Michael and Simon Rosen. Christian Bridge won a competition in Robot Wars Magazine to join the team for Series 4. In Series 7, Davies got a job as a technical assistant on the show and left, so the team was entirely changed. Pritchard returned and took over the controls with teammates Paul Wier and then-webmaster of the official Panic Attack website, Jamie McGarry.

== Series 2 ==
=== Heats ===
Panic Attack was airborne in the gauntlet after Sir Killalot held down the end of the see-saw and Panic Attack drove off onto Dead Metal. Good control and driving meant it outmanoeuvred Shunt in the trial. It managed to flip Whirling Dervish with its spikes in the semi-final, before winning the show by pushing Disruptor into the pit.

=== Semi-final ===
In the Gauntlet, Panic Attack advanced exactly the same distance as Mace, meaning that the two had to run the course again at the same time. Mace was subsequently trapped and pitted by the Sentinel, putting Panic Attack through. In the trial, Panic Attack advanced through Pinball. In the semi-final battle, it beat the favourites Mortis by putting it into the pit.

=== Grand Final ===
Panic Attack won its Eliminator for the Grand Final by immobilising Killertron, and subsequently pushed Sgt. Bash into the pit. In the final itself, Panic Attack avoided being flipped by Cassius, and Cassius itself went into the pit by mistake for a shock victory.

== Series 3 ==
=== UK Championship ===
Panic Attack flipped over first Axios and then Toe Cutter to reach the Heat Final against X-Terminator. After immobilising X-Terminator's weapon, Panic Attack flipped it over.

In the semi-final, Panic Attack flipped over Thing 2 to advance to a battle for a place in the Grand Final, against Firestorm. This battle went to a judges' decision, in favour of Firestorm, officially dethroning Panic Attack of its status.

=== First World Championship ===
Panic Attack represented Wales in this tournament and fought 101 of England. In attempting to pit its opponent, Panic Attack drove itself into the pit.

== Series 4 ==
Panic Attack were the winners of the Sumo Basho competition in Series 4, being the only robot to stay longer than Shunt on the Sumo platform. It was seeded 4th for reaching the semi-finals in Series 3 and being an ex-champion.

=== Round 1 vs. Overkill GTI vs. SMIDSY ===
Panic Attack drove into Overkill. SMIDSY then got under Overkill, and Overkill flipped it later. Panic Attack wedged Overkill into the arena spike, and lifted it, before it was rammed by SMIDSY. Panic Attack lifted Overkill again onto the arena wall. Both Panic Attack and SMIDSY then pushed Overkill into the CPZ, and lifted it. It went to a judges decision and Overkill GTI was eliminated.

=== Round 2 vs. Saw Point ===
Panic Attack tried to lift Saw Point, but lifted itself instead. It then tipped Saw Point onto its side, and lifted it. It tried to flip Saw Point out of the arena but could not, so instead it pushed it around the arena. It was later considered immobilized and was dropped in the pit.

=== Round 3 vs. SMIDSY ===
SMIDSY rammed into Panic Attack's sides, and drove over the robot many times. Panic Attack then pushed SMIDSY into Shunt, but was caught itself by Dead Metal. Panic Attack then lifted SMIDSY and held it over the flame pit. Its fork had got stuck in SMIDSY's wheel opening, but Panic Attack managed to drag it around, eventually lowering SMIDSY in the pit.

=== Round 4 vs. Spawn Of Scutter ===
Spawn drove over Panic Attack, which lifted it and pushed it into the arena wall and Shunt's CPZ. Spawn tried to use its spike, but Panic Attack lifted it and wedged it on the arena wall.

=== Round 5 vs. Stinger ===
Panic Attack drove into Stinger, but found it hard to attack. Stinger used its axe on Panic Attack's sides and lifting mechanism. Stinger spun around and hit Panic Attack many times. Panic Attack pushed Stinger into Matilda, but went into the CPZ. Panic Attack then pushed Stinger into the arena wall, but the judges decision meant that Stinger was the winner, who finished 3rd overall.

The team were booed, as many thought that Panic Attack should have gone through.

=== War of Independence Round 1 vs. Rammstein (USA) ===
Although the American robot was heavier, Panic Attack easily turned it over with its lifting forks repeatedly but Rammstein was invertible and ran away. After a while though, Rammstein started to lose power as its batteries were designed for three minutes battle rather than the UK's five, so Panic Attack picked it up once more and dropped it into the pit.

=== War of Independence Round 2 vs. Mortis (UK) ===
This was a rematch from the Second Wars when Panic Attack pitted Mortis. Despite consistently lifting and pushing Mortis around the arena (at one point into Sir Killalot), Mortis pounded away on the top of Panic Attack with its axe and won on a very close judge's decision to beat Frenzy in the final and win the War of Independence.

== Series 5 ==
Panic Attack was seeded 6th for this war. It now had improved side skirts and its self-righting mechanism could be used for lifting or trapping other robots.

In Round 1, Panic Attack pushed a partially immobilised Barber-Ous into the pit, and then did the same in Round 2 against Tiberius 2. In the Heat Final against Kat 3, Panic Attack became stuck into its opponent, but pushed them into the pit.

In its semi-final, Panic Attack was immobilised by Pussycat. It then went into the Loser's Melee, whereby the victor would return to the contest. Its opponents were Firestorm 3 and Wheely Big Cheese. The force of a flip on Panic Attack from the latter caused internal damage, and after Wheely Big Cheese broke down, the judges decided on Firestorm 3.

== Series 6 ==
Panic Attack was seeded 8th for this series. Its design was vastly changed from previous years, with a flatter body, no self-righter, and four wheels instead of six. This version was colloquially referred to as "Panic Attack Gold" or "Panic Attack 24k" because it was painted gold and silver instead of its signature yellow and black. Davies was wholly unsatisfied with this version.

In the First Round, Panic Attack fought Kronic 2, ROCS and Corkscrew. It received damage from Corkscrew, who later drove into the pit. ROCS were also eliminated after being flipped by Kronic 2. In Round 2, Panic Attack put A-Kill into the pit.

In the Heat Final, Terrorhurtz continuously hit Panic Attack with their axe until it was immobilised. After having been counted out, Panic Attack had its top ripped off by Matilda's flywheel.

== Series 7 ==
Panic Attack was reverted to its chunkier body and caution-striped colour scheme. Its self-righter was replaced with a hard rubber panel for protection against overhead weapons, and a large skirt was added at the back. It was seeded 8th again.

In Round 1, Panic Attack fought Mega Morg, Edge Hog and Spin Doctor. It flipped over Spin Doctor, who were counted out. Panic Attack and Mega Morg then co-operated to push Edge Hog into the pit.

Panic Attack had its weapon immobilised by Tough As Nails in Round 2, who won on a judges' decision and went on to win the heat.

== Videos ==
- Panic Attack vs. Terrorhurtz
- Spawn of Scutter vs. Panic Attack
- Panic Attack vs. FireStorm
- X-Terminator 2 vs. Panic Attack
- Panic Attack vs. Stinger
- Mortis vs. Panic Attack

Preceded by Roadblock	UK Robot Wars; Reigning Champion (Series 2)	Succeeded by Chaos 2
Preceded by Roadblock	UK Robot Wars; Best Newcomer (Series 2)	Succeeded by Hypno-Disc
