= Robot Wars (TV series) =

Robot combat competition

- Also known as: Robot Wars Extreme
- Genre: Robot competition
- Created by: Tom Gutteridge; Stephen Carsey
- Presented by: Jeremy Clarkson; Craig Charles; Dara Ó Briain; Angela Scanlon
- Starring: Philippa Forrester; Julia Reed; Jayne Middlemiss
- Judges: Noel Sharkey; Eric Dickinson; Adam Harper; Martin Smith; Myra Wilson; Mat Irvine; Sethu Vijayakumar; Lucy Rogers
- Narrated by: Jonathan Pearce
- Country of origin: United Kingdom
- Original language: English
- No. of series: 9 (Original); 3 (Revival); 12 (Overall)
- No. of episodes: 155 (Original); 22 (Revival); 177 (Overall)

Production
- Production locations: London Docklands (1998–1999); Elstree Studios (1999–2000; 2001–2002); Park Street Studios (2000–2001); RAF Newton (2002–2004); Westway Park (2016–2018)
- Running time: 30 minutes (1998–1999); 45 minutes (1999–2003); 60 minutes (2003–2018)
- Production companies: TV21 (1998–2001); Mentorn International (2001–2002); Mentorn (2002–18)

Original release
- Network: BBC Two; BBC One (2000, one episode)
- Release: 20 February 1998 – 4 October 2002
- Release: 24 July 2016 – 7 January 2018
- Network: BBC Choice
- Release: 8 October 2001 – 7 February 2003
- Network: Five
- Release: 2 November 2003 – 28 March 2004

Robot Wars is a British robot combat television series created by Tom Gutteridge and Stephen Carsey which aired from 1998 to 2004 and from 2016 to 2018. The series involves teams of amateur and professional roboteers operating remote-controlled robots to fight against each other in an arena, which features hazards and the heavier "House Robots" which are hostile to all combatants. The first two series also included assault and trial courses.

The original run of the show consisted of six series broadcast on BBC Two from 20 February 1998 to 4 October 2002 (though the fifth and sixth series originally aired on BBC Choice), followed by a seventh series broadcast on Channel 5 from 2 November 2003 to 7 March 2004. A celebrity special aired on BBC One in 2000, and the spin-off Robot Wars Extreme originally aired on BBC Choice for two series in 2001 and 2003, before also airing on BBC Two.

Jeremy Clarkson presented the first series, before being replaced by Craig Charles for the rest of the original run, with co-hosting duties taken by Philippa Forrester (1998–2000, 2002–2003), Julia Reed (2000–2001) and Jayne Middlemiss (2003–2004). The revival aired three series and five specials on BBC Two from 11 July 2016 to 7 January 2018, presented by Dara Ó Briain and Angela Scanlon. The announcer for the entirety of the series' run was Jonathan Pearce.

== History ==
=== American Robot Wars events ===
Robot Wars was the brainchild of Marc Thorpe, a designer working for the LucasToys division of Lucasfilm. In 1992, Thorpe had the initial idea for robot combat sport after unsuccessfully attempting to create a radio-controlled vacuum cleaner. In 1994, Marc Thorpe created Robot Wars and held the first competition at the Fort Mason Center in San Francisco. Approximately one month prior to the event, Thorpe formed a partnership with New York–based record company Sm:)e Communications, later Profile Records, who provided additional funding.

=== Original television series ===
Original Robot Wars logo from 1998 to 2004

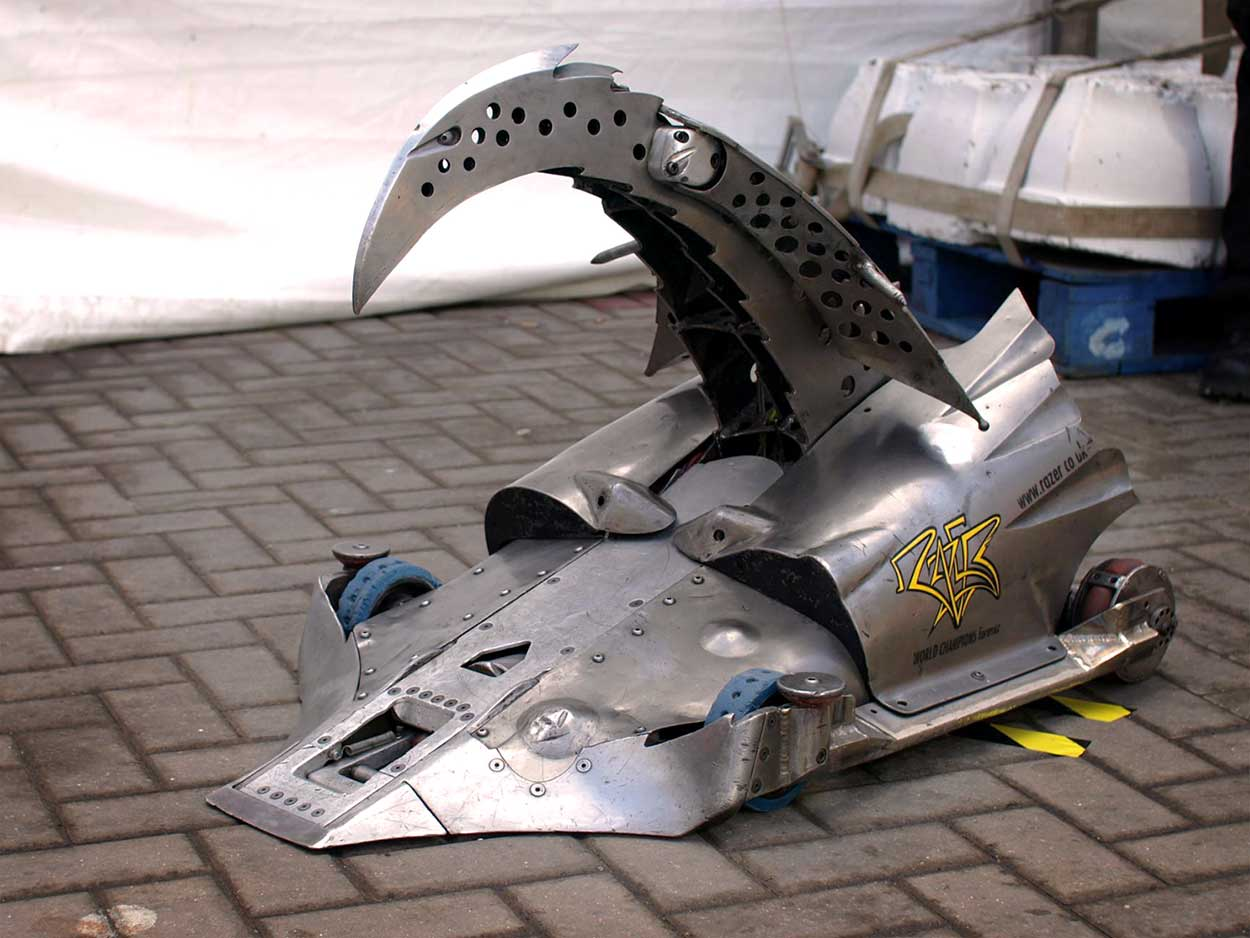
Razer, one of the most successful robots in the original series. It had the ability to puncture competitors.

Gutteridge and one of his producers Steve Carsey created a television format based on the Robot Wars concept. They produced a live event opposite BBC Television Centre in Wood Lane, Shepherd's Bush, London and hired Derek Foxwell to build 3 combat robots, 2 of which were named The Mouse and Grunt who would eventually take part in the first British series of Robot Wars, to take on three American robots, Thor, La Machine and The Master, all of which were veterans of the original American competition. The Controller of BBC Two, Michael Jackson, attended the event, which was not filmed and he promised to commission a series. However, it was not until 1998 that a subsequent Controller of BBC Two, Mark Thompson, fulfilled Jackson's promise and actually commissioned six episodes. Gutteridge and Carsey were producers and Foxwell was the technical supervisor and senior technical consultant. He drafted the rules and regulations and was in charge of the pit area and the technical team, which scrutinised the robots, got them on and off stage and helped the contestants prepare and repair their robots. Mat Irvine, initially a member of the technical team, served as a member of the judging panel in 2002 and 2003.

The three person judging panel consisted of Noel Sharkey (head judge on every series: 1998–2004, 2016–18), Eric Dickinson (1998), Adam Harper (1998–99), Martin Smith (1999–2004), Myra Wilson (2000–01), Mat Irvine (2001–04), Sethu Vijayakumar (2016–18) and Lucy Rogers (2016–18).

On the first day, I was in the dressing room and looking in the mirror and looking down at the arena. And they were pulling the robots into the arena on an invisible twine because nothing was working. And I was thinking: "Oh my God, what have I done with my career?" And you know, within the blink of an eye, it was the most watched show on BBC2.

— Presenter Craig Charles on the success of Robot Wars in the late 1990s and early 2000s which aired on Friday evening and attracted over six million viewers.

Profile sought no input or consent from Thorpe before doing this, which aggravated the already troubled relationship between Thorpe and Profile Records and indirectly spurred legal disagreements surrounding the ownership of the Robot Wars concept. The legal proceedings surrounding these would last until 6 February 2002. Mentorn used Thorpe as a Consultant on the series, however and the initial series of Robot Wars in the UK was broadcast over six weeks in February and March 1998. It was an immediate hit, with more than two million viewers and a further 18 episodes were commissioned by the BBC that year. 155 episodes were produced in total and the show was seen in 26 countries. Two series were produced in the US for The National Network (now Paramount Network) and a version was also shown on Nickelodeon. TechTV (and later G4techTV/G4) in the US aired the UK series proper. Series were also produced in many European countries. Although the series had various directors and producers, all were produced in the UK by Mentorn and executive produced by Tom Gutteridge and Steve Carsey. The initial series were staged in various film studios around London but the stage and pit area became too large to fit into any of the conventional studios, so filming was later moved to an aircraft hangar at RAF Newton.

The series received six million viewers in the UK during its peak in the late 1990s, and the format went on to become a worldwide success which has aired in 45 countries. Its merchandising was commercially successful, being one of the best-selling toy ranges of 2002.

Viewing figures dropped significantly in the early 2000s, reaching only 1.2 million in the sixth series – the final to be broadcast on BBC Two. It was cancelled by the BBC in March 2003, and Mentorn announced it was making 22 episodes for Channel 5, concluding with The Third World Championships broadcast in March 2004. Following its move to Channel 5 in November 2003, the show first began airing in a new Sunday night slot and launched with one million viewers; however ratings fell quickly to 800,000 resulting in the show moving to Saturday nights after just three episodes. Channel 5 later axed the show after one series due to low ratings. After Robot Wars ended, an edited half-hour version of this series aired on Fox Kids (later Jetix) from 2004, on Bravo from after 2004, on Dave from 2010 and on Challenge & Sky History from before 2016.

In 2003, roboteers from the series formed The Fighting Robot Association in order to organize live events. In 2013, Roaming Robots purchased the rights to the Robot Wars brand from Robot Wars LLC and operated their travelling robotic combat show under that name. The use of the name Robot Wars for live shows ceased in early 2017, being renamed Extreme Robots.

=== Revival ===
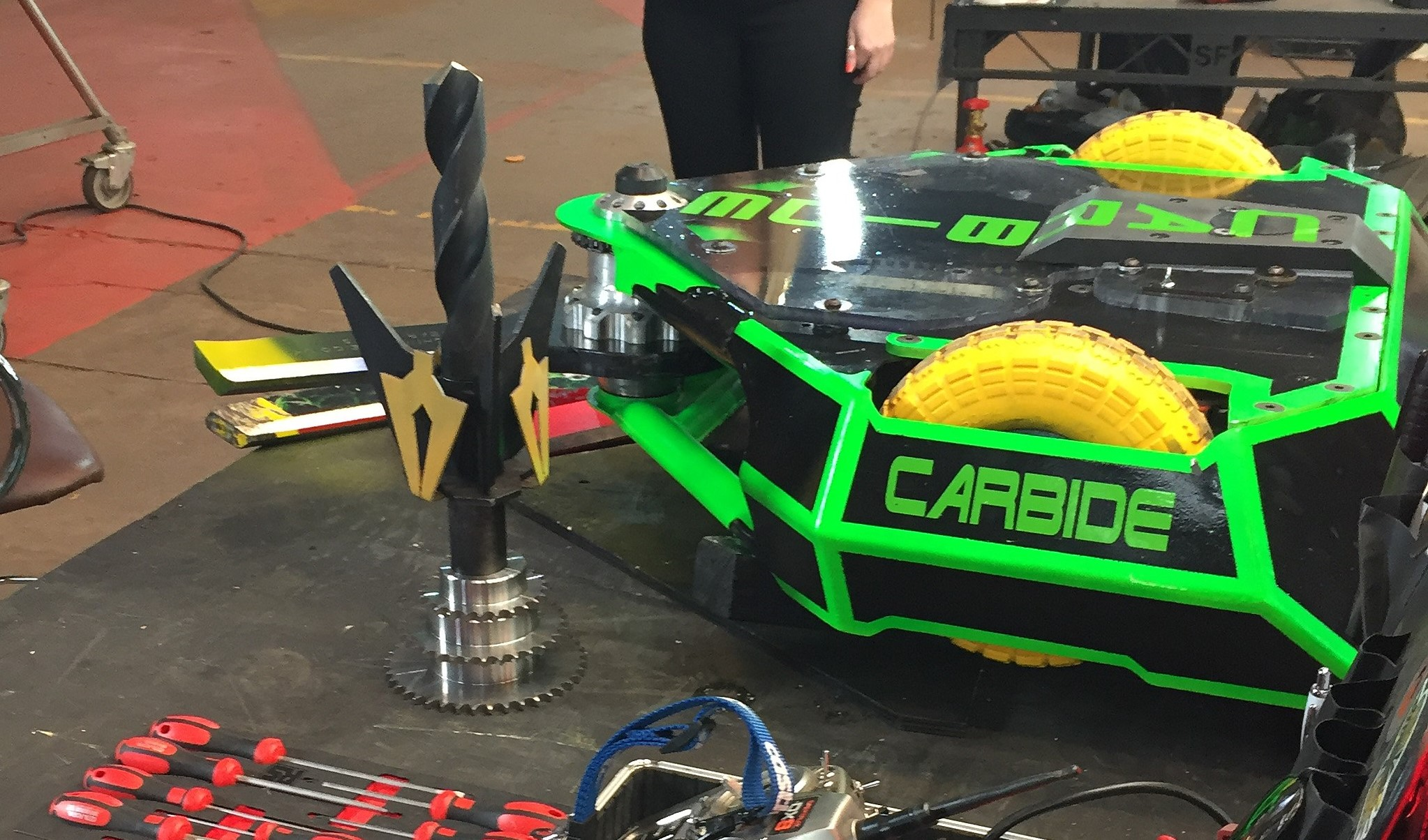
Carbide, the winning robot in the second rebooted series. A fast-spinning bar is its primary weapon.

On 13 January 2016, the BBC confirmed that it would be rebooting the show for a six-part series. The revived series was hosted by Dara Ó Briain and Angela Scanlon with Jonathan Pearce returning as commentator. The first episode was broadcast on 24 July at 8pm, the same slot as Top Gear. Some robots from the original series returned, including Behemoth and Storm II, as well as four of the original House Robots, which were upgraded to be heavier, faster, better armed and with new looks. The 2016 series was filmed in a warehouse at Westway Park in Renfrew, Scotland.

The first episode received about two million viewers and was the top trending topic on Twitter with over 20,000 tweets.

A second rebooted series was commissioned with a first celebrity special in 16 years, in which celebrities, such as Olympians Kadeena Cox and Alistair Brownlee and Jonny Brownlee, TV presenters Suzi Perry, Neil Oliver and Maggie Aderin-Pocock, singer Jordan Stevens and radio presenters Scott Mills and Robbie Savage had bespoke robots designed for them by eight major roboteers, who mentored them during the specials.

During its original airing, the first rebooted series was sometimes referred to as "Series 1", presenting itself as a completely new show. Starting in 2017, however, the BBC began referring to it as Series 8, with the following second series appropriately dubbed Series 9, acknowledging itself as a continuation of the original show. Following the 10th series, it was revealed that the BBC had decided not to renew the show for an 11th, axing Robot Wars for the second time. The cancellation was met with backlash from fans.

== Battle rules ==
A robot could lose a match in several ways during the knockout format of the show:

- Immobilisation: A robot that is unable to move is counted out. In the original series 30 seconds of immobility were necessary, in later series this was reduced to 10 seconds.
- Pit: One of the arena hazards is the pit of oblivion, a large square hole in the arena. A robot that falls or is pushed into this is eliminated.
- Removal from arena: If a robot is ejected from the arena – typically by the flipper or vertical flywheel of an opponent, it is eliminated. In the original series the perimeter of the arena was a short barrier, in later series the wall was higher, making this type of elimination harder. In the rebooted series, only certain areas of the arena were not fully walled off. This meant that removal from the arena was only practical in certain areas.
- If none of the above conditions were satisfied, a panel of three judges (listed below) scored the competitors on style, control, damage and aggression.

The judges' decisions are based on the following categories:
- Aggression: The extent to which the robot was on the 'front foot' against the opposing robot as opposed to staying out of trouble.
- Damage: The amount of damage inflicted on the opposing robot.
- Control: The ability of the driver to push opposing robots, avoiding the arena hazards and if they're attacking how they're meant to.
- Style (original series only): The extent to which the robot demonstrated its abilities such as self-righting. For the revived series, the style category was omitted.
In the original series, the Aggression, Damage, Control and Style points were weighted 3:4:2:1 respectively. In the 2016 series the weightings for Aggression, Damage and Control were 3:2:1, with "Style" no longer a judged criterion.

Although the format changed several times over the years, these rules remained the same across all series and competitions.

== Format ==
=== Domestic ===
Series	Competition Format	The Heats	The Semi-finals	The Final	Side and Trial Events
1	Six robots in six heats.; The six winners met in a single melee to determine the champion.	Round 1: All six robots took on the Gauntlet, an obstacle course featuring various hazards and the House Robots. The robot with the shortest distance was eliminated.; Round 2: The remaining five robots took part in a Trial event (a challenge of skill and driving, with the exact event changing weekly) with the worst performing robot being eliminated.; Round 3 and 4: One-on-one knockout battles to determine a heat winner.	N/A	The Final was held as a melee at the end of the final heat, as a 6 way melee.	British Bulldog; Football; Labyrinth; Snooker Octagon; Stock Car; Sumo Basho
2	Six robots in twelve heats.; The twelve heat winners reached one of two semi-finals.; Two robots from each semi-final reached the series final.	Round 1: All six robots took on the Gauntlet, an obstacle course featuring various hazards and the House Robots. The robot with the shortest distance was eliminated.; Round 2: The remaining five robots took part in a Trial event (a challenge of skill and driving, with the exact event changing weekly) with the worst performing robot being eliminated.; Round 3 and 4: One-on-one knockout battles to determine a heat winner.	Same as the heat structure, except there was only round of arena battles, with the two winners advancing to the Grand Final.	One-on-one knockout battles to determine a series winner. Additionally, there was a third place playoff.	Joust; King of the Castle; Pinball Warrior; Football; Skittles; Sumo Basho; Tug of War
3	Eight robots in sixteen heats.; The sixteen heat winners reached one of two semi-finals.; Two robots from each semi-final reached the series final.	Rounds 1, 2 and 3: One-on-one knockout battles to determine a heat winner.	Two rounds of one-on-one knockout battles to determine two series finalists.	One-on-one knockout battles to determine a series winner. Additionally, there was a third place playoff.	Pinball Warrior; Football; Middleweight Melee; Walker Battles
4	Six robots in sixteen heats.; The sixteen heats winners reached one of two semi-finals.; Two robots from each semi-final reached the series final.	Round 1: Three-way Arena melee with one robot being eliminated.; Rounds 2 and 3: One-on-one knockout battles to determine a heat winner.	Two rounds of one-on-one knockout battles to determine two series finalists.	One-on-one knockout battles to determine a series winner. Additionally, there was a third place playoff.	Pinball Warrior; Sumo Basho
5	Eight robots in twelve heats.; The twelve heat winners reached one of two semi-finals.; Two robots from each semi-final reached the series final.	Rounds 1, 2 and 3: One-on-one knockout battles to determine a heat winner.	Round 1: Three one-on-one knockout battles.; Play-offs: The losers of round 1 faced one another in a three-way melee, with the winner advancing to Round 2.; Round 2: Two one-on-one knockout battles to determine two series finalists.	One-on-one knockout battles to determine a series winner. Additionally, there was a third place playoff.	None
6	Eight robots in twelve heats.; The twelve heat winners reached one of two semi-finals.; Two robots from each semi-final reached the series final.	Round 1: A four-way melee with two robots being eliminated in each melee.; Rounds 2, 3 and 4: One-on-one knockout battles to determine a heat winner.	Round 1: Three one-on-one knockout battles.; Play-offs: The losers of round 1 faced one another in a three-way melee, with the winner advancing to Round 2.; Round 2: Two one-on-one knockout battles to determine two series finalists.	One-on-one knockout battles to determine a series winner. Additionally, there was a third place playoff.	None
7	Eight robots in sixteen heats.; The sixteen heat winners reached one of two semi-finals.; Two robots from each semi-final reached the series final.	Round 1: A four-way melee with two robots being eliminated in each melee.; Rounds 2, 3 and 4: One-on-one knockout battles to determine a heat winner.	Two rounds of one-on-one knockout battles to determine two series finalists.	One-on-one knockout battles to determine a series winner. Additionally, there was a third place playoff.	Qualifying bouts for the World Championships; Exhibition fights from weight classes other than heavyweight
8	Eight robots in five heats.; The five heat winners would move on to the Grand Final along with a wildcard robot chosen by the judges based on the robot's performance.	Round 1: A pair of four-way melees with two robots qualifying in each bout.; League: The four resulting robots then entered a mini round-robin league. Points were given for wins, and the top two advancing to the heat final. If there was a tie in points, the winner of their head-to-head match went through.; Heat final: One-on-one knockout battle to determine a heat winner.	N/A	Same format as the heats, but the opening melees had three robots instead of four, with one eliminated in each.	None
9	Eight robots in five heats.; The five heat winners would move on to the Grand Final along with a wildcard robot chosen by the judges based on the robot's performance.	Round 1: A pair of four-way melees with two robots qualifying in each bout.; League: The four resulting robots then entered a mini round-robin league. Points were given for wins, and the top two advancing to the heat final. If there was a tie in points, the winner of their head-to-head match went through.; Heat final: One-on-one knockout battle to determine a heat winner.	N/A	Same format as the heats, but the opening melees had three robots instead of four, with one eliminated in each.	None
10	Six robots in five heats.; The heat winners move on to the grand final.; Robots in second and third place entered into 10 way wild card battle of which the winner would also move into the Grand Final.	Round 1: Two three-way battles. Winners moved to the heat semi-finals.; Play-offs: Each losing robot in Round 1 fought another losing robot in a one-on-one knockout battle. The two winners of the battles also advanced to the heat semi-finals.; Semi-finals: One-on-one knockout battle. Winning robots advanced to the heat final, the two losing robots moved to the third place playoff.; Third-place playoff: One-on-one knockout battle. The winning robot was entered in the 10-way wildcard battle hosted at the start of the series final.; Heat final: One-on-one knockout battle. The winner advanced to the series finals, whilst the loser would be entered in the wildcard battle.	N/A	Wildcard battle: 10-way melee, with the winner joining the 5 heat winners.; The rest of the series final worked the same as the heats except for the omission of the third-place match.	None

=== Extreme ===
There were also two series made for the UK, Robot Wars Extreme, which did not focus on a single championship.

Bold text indicates events that debuted ahead of the actual debut series.

Bold Italic text indicates events that made separate debuts ahead of the added event of the second series.

Extreme 1 and 2 Events	These tournaments and themed battles continued over the entire series
All-Star Tournament	Knockout tournament featuring the most well-known competitors.
**Annihilator**	Six-way battles with one robot eliminated per round.
Challenge Belt	Where robots would try to defend their honour for the challenge belt.
Mayhems	Three-way battles to progress to the series annihilators.
**Tag Team Terror**	Two robots team up and fight tag-team style (though usually all four robots were out).
Vengeance Battle	This allowed robots with unfinished business or grudges to settle things once and for all.
Wildcard Warriors	Newcomers take on established robots.
Robot rebellion	Competitor Robots Face the House Robots.
Extreme 2 Added Events	This series followed one theme over each episode
New Blood	A new competitor robot tournament for places in the following Robot Wars domestic tournament.
Iron Maidens	Women took control.
Minor Meltdown	Children took control.
Robot Rampage	A tournament with robots in lower weight classes such as **antweight**, **featherweight**, **lightweight** and **middleweight**.
University Challenge	All robots were entered by Universities.
Commonwealth Carnage	All robots were from teams based in the Commonwealth. (Similar to the World Championship)
European Championship	All robots were from teams based in Europe.

== Presenters ==
Main presenters

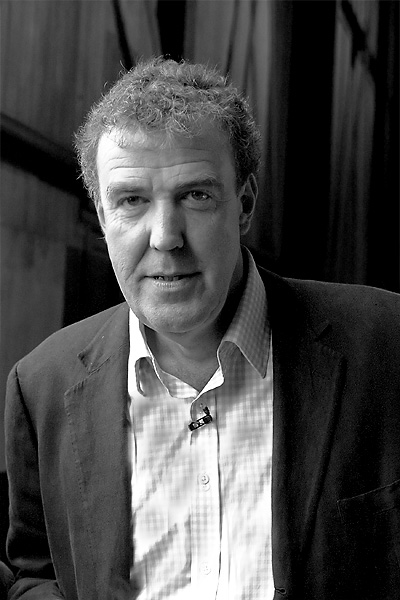
Jeremy Clarkson (1998)

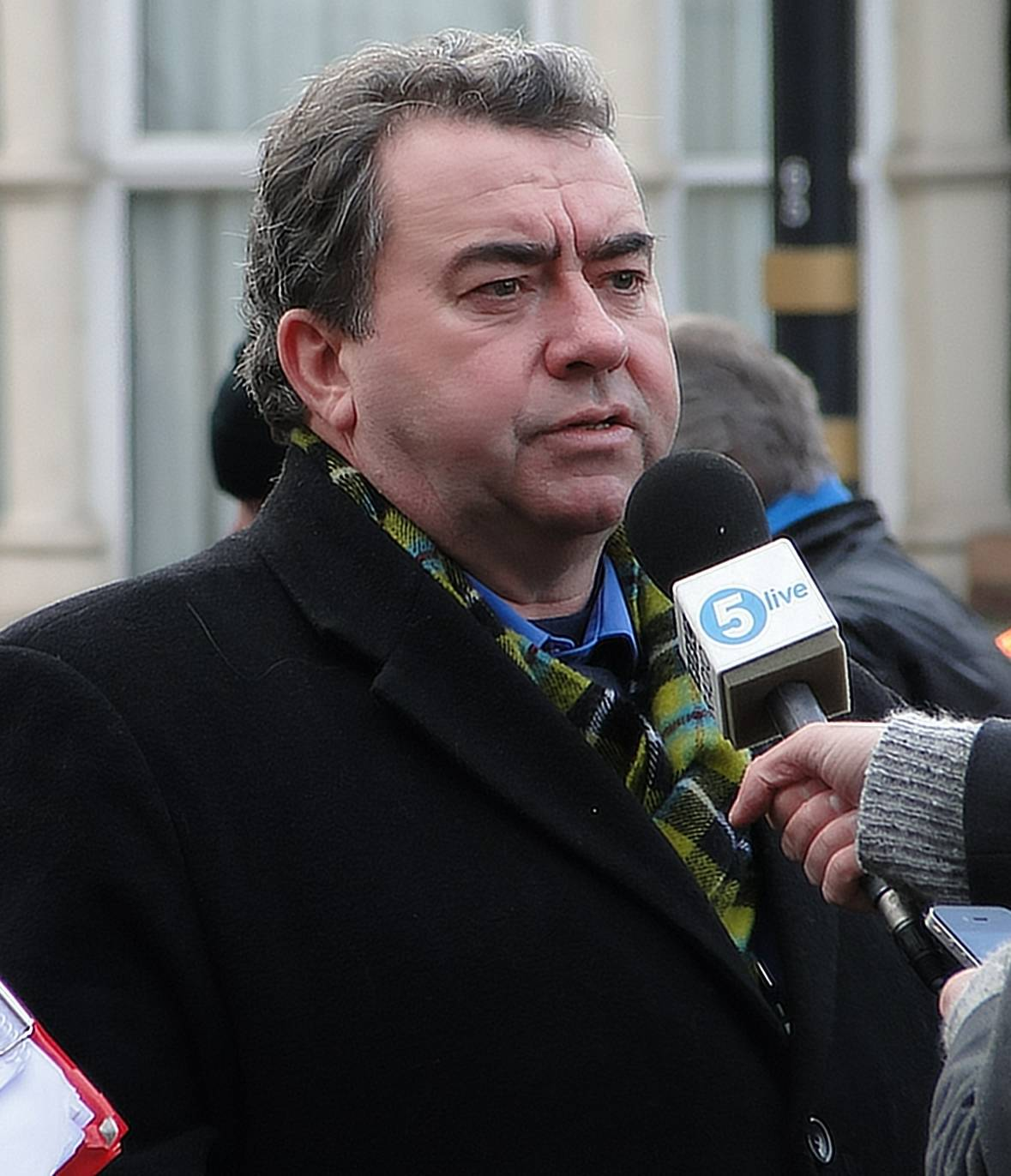
Jonathan Pearce, commentator

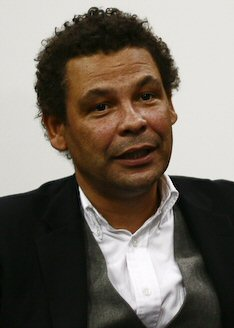
Craig Charles (1998–2004)

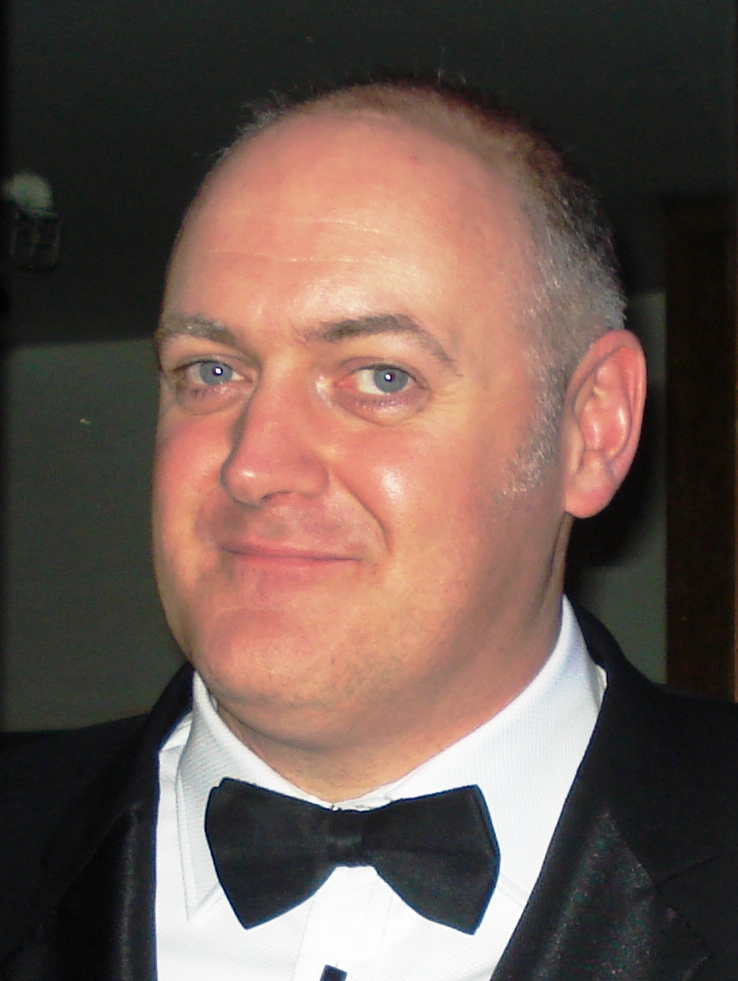
Dara Ó Briain (2016–2018)

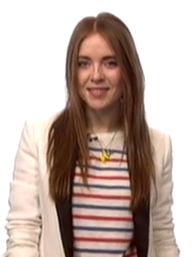
Angela Scanlon (2016–2018)

The first series of Robot Wars was presented by Jeremy Clarkson and co-hosted by Philippa Forrester. In keeping with his edgy persona established on Top Gear, Clarkson frequently made tongue-in-cheek jokes about competitors and their robots, such as remarking that a contestant robot called "Skarab" looked like "cheese on toast".

Clarkson left Robot Wars after the first series and was replaced with Craig Charles. Charles, well known as playing the character Dave Lister in the science fiction-themed sitcom Red Dwarf, was seen as taking the programme and its contestants more seriously than Clarkson and was more enthusiastic while presenting it. He was also often known as the "Master of Mayhem" when introduced at the start of episodes from Extreme 1 onwards. Charles would close each episode with a four line poem ending with the words "Robot Wars". Charles presented Robot Wars until it ceased production in 2004.

"My son, Jack, was a fan of the first series and said I should get involved. So I made a few phone calls and the rest is history."

— Craig Charles speaking on how he got involved with Robot Wars.

In comparison to Charles' background in science fiction, Philippa Forrester was best known as co-host of the science and technology programme Tomorrow's World. Her role on Robot Wars was as the pit reporter who would speak to contestants about their robots before and after battles. Forrester was pit reporter for six of the show's nine series; Julia Reed took the role for Series 4 and Extreme 1 since Forrester was unable to participate in the programme due to pregnancy, but Forrester returned for Series 5, Series 6 and Extreme 2. When the programme moved to Channel 5 for the seventh series, Forrester did not return for unknown reasons, so Jayne Middlemiss took over the pit reporter duties.

Jonathan Pearce was the show's commentator throughout its entire run, becoming one of only two people (the other being judge Noel Sharkey) to appear in every episode of the programme; he commentated in the same loud and enthusiastic manner as his football commentaries. The programme was well known for phrases such as "Roboteers, stand by", "3. 2. 1. Activate" and "Cease!". These phrases were announced by the director, Stuart McDonald and became a recognisable part of the series for the entire duration of its run.

In 2016, Dara Ó Briain and Angela Scanlon were announced as the hosts of the eighth series, with Jonathan Pearce returning as commentator. They reprised their roles in the ninth and tenth series.

== House Robots ==
Throughout the series, House Robots acted as obstacles to competing robots in battles and challenges. House Robots were permitted to attack robots that were in the Corner Patrol Zones at the corners of the arena or upon the submission of a competing robot. The House Robots were an intrinsic part of the programme's success and merchandising of these robots was highly successful. Furthermore, the House Robots were not subject to the 100 kg (220 lb) weight limit or weapon rules that contestant robots had to adhere to, the most notable example of this was Sergeant Bash's flamethrower.

From the Fourth Wars, a non-competitive "Refbot" was present during fights. This robot served as the referee, and conveyed officiating signals (such as counting out immobile competitors) on the arena, gave occasional nudges to help battles along and could deploy a fire extinguisher where necessary.

For Series 8, new versions of Matilda, Shunt, Dead Metal and Sir Killalot were constructed. They are considerably heavier with improved weaponry. All the house robots are over 300 kg (661 lb) in weight and Sir Killalot now weighs 741 kg (1,634 lb). Visually, all four look similar to their predecessors, but with significant differences: Dead Metal's head has been enlarged with glowing eyes, Matilda's back-mounted fins have been replaced with smaller crocodilian scales, spikes appear on her frill, her eyes are now red and her whole head section now flips up; Shunt has enlarged wheel protectors and metal chimneys replacing the smokestack; and Sir Killalot's armour and helmet has been entirely redesigned. This was said to be to show the actual shape of Sir Killalot's head, rather than the helmet he is wearing. The other house robots did not return for this series.

Bold text indicates house robots that returned for the new series.

House Robot	First competed	Weight kg (lb)	Speed km/h (mph)	Height cm (in)	Length cm (in)	Width cm (in)	Power	Weaponry	Strengths	Weakness	Method
Cassius Chrome	Seventh War	250 (550)	32 (20)	85 (33)	130 (51)	100 (39)	2x24V magnetic drive motors	Two rotary driven interchangeable "fists" and front shovel.	Fastest House Robot, interchanageable weaponry	Requires time to build attack	High speed ramming
**Dead Metal**	First War	112 (247) (original); 343 (756) (revival)	21 (13)	70 (28)	160 (63)	100 (39)	Battery driven motors	CO_{2} power driven 1.4m wide pincers with 300 kg (660 lb) grip and overhead circular saw arm (S1-2) / 4000rpm magnesium circular saw mounted on hydraulic cradle which spins at 340 km/h (210 mph) (S3 onwards)	Weapons synergy	Poor manoeuvrability	Grab a competitor robot and engage circular saw
Growler	Sixth War	375 (827)	27 (17)	76 (30)	152 (60)	130 (51)	Six batteries and two electric motors	3,000 psi (21,000 kPa) front jaws and rear-mounted flame jet (Extreme 2 only)	Speed and sheer destructive power	Unpredictable	Grab with jaws & push around arena, grab & ram into side walls
**Matilda**	First War	116 (256) (original); 350 (770) (revival)	23 (14)	66 (26)	140 (55)	66 (26)	Battery driven engine	800 psi (5,500 kPa) pneumatic tusks that can lift 1.5 t (1.7 tons) rear mounted chainsaw (S1 to 4) / vertical 35 kg (77 lb) Hardox flywheel spinning 25 times per second; (Extreme 1 onwards)	Tough exo-skeleton	Lacks self-control	Lift/flip with tusks, hit with rear weaponry
Mr. Psycho	Sixth War	750 (1,650)	13 (8)	150 (59)	163 (64)	145 (57)	12 batteries	30 kg (66 lb) hammer and grabbing claw of 5 t (5.5 tons) force	Heaviest and tallest House Robot	High power usage	Hammer strike, grab/lift with claw
Refbot	Fourth War	120 (260)	11 (7)	130 (51)	140 (55)	90 (35)	Battery power	Front and rear scoops; electric countout; fire extinguisher and coloured card medallion	N/A – Non-combative	N/A – Non-combative	N/A – Non-combative
Sergeant Bash	First War	120 (260)	13 (8)	90 (35)	140 (55)	90 (35)	Four Batteries	Propane fueled flamethrower (S1-7), Front ramming spike and rear grinding disc (S1-2) / front hydraulic pincers (S3 onwards)	Long-range weaponry	Limited fuel capacity	Engage flamethrower, grab with crushing jaws
**Shunt**	First War	105 (231) (original); 327 (721) (revival)	18 (11)	70 (28)	130 (51)	110 (43)	Prototype electric motor	Rear ramming plough, Front lifting 300 psi (2,100 kPa) pneumatic scoop 350 kg (770 lb) and titanium-tipped axe that can strike at the speed of 0.25 seconds with up to 1000 kg of force	High pushing power	Prone to being flipped and has no self-righting mechanism	Strike with axe, push/lift with scoop
**Sir Killalot**	Second War	520 (1,150) (original); 741 (1,634) (revival)	16 (10)	130 (51)	120 (47)	120 (47)	Petrol engine	Hydraulic claws mounted on lifting arm with 2.5 tonnes (2.8 tons) of crush force and spike lance (S2) / rotating drill lance (S3-S7);	Heavy with powerful weaponry	Easily Toppled, Flammable	Spike with lance, grab/lift with claw

== Arena and hazards ==
=== Arenas ===
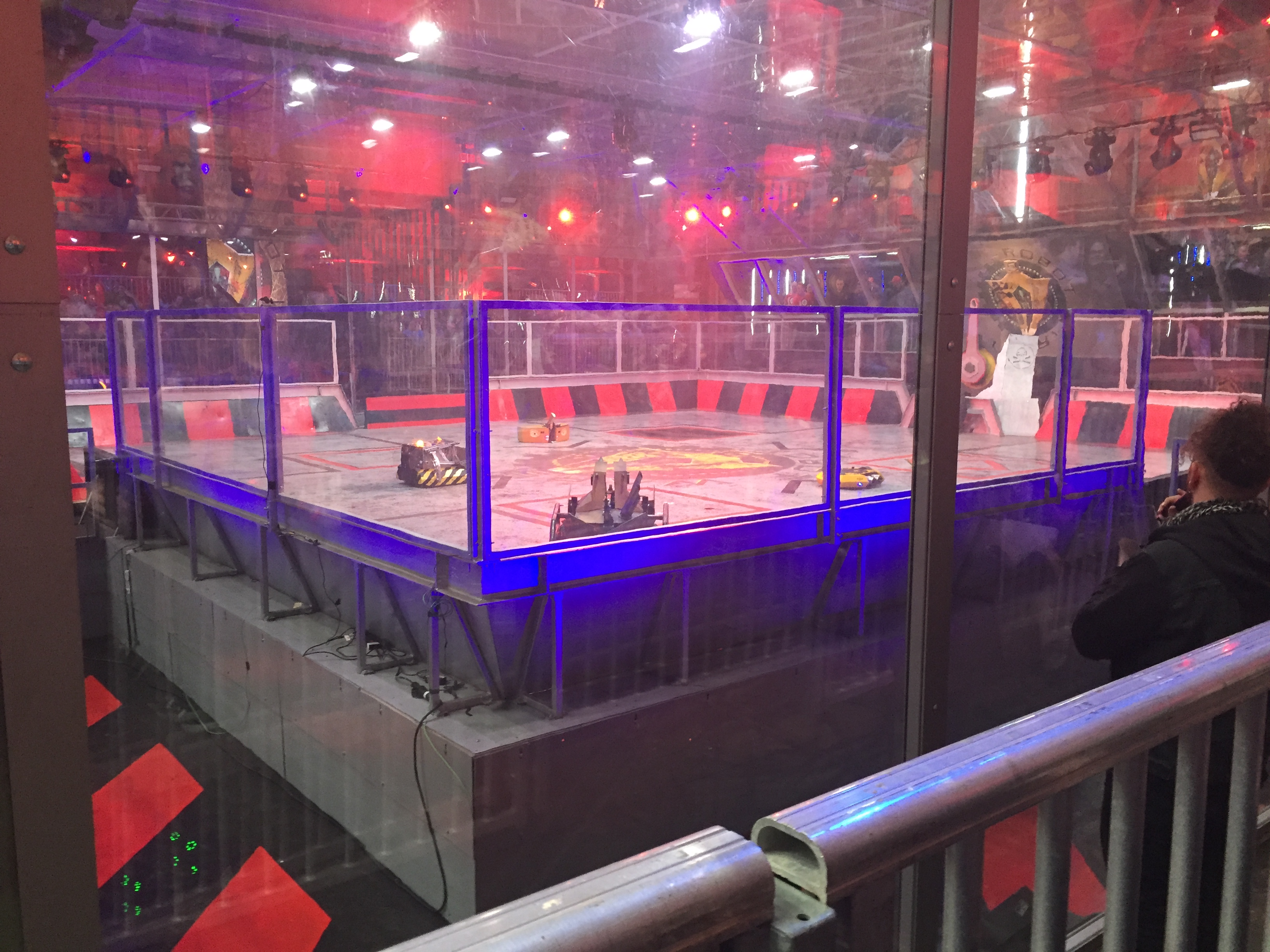
The Renfrew arena used for the rebooted series

There were numerous arena incarnations used during the original run of Robot Wars on the BBC. These arenas were also used by international versions such as Robot Wars: Extreme Warriors in the United States. The arena was approximately 32 by 48 feet (9.8 by 14.6 m). For Series 1 to 3 the arena was not enclosed as such, as the audience were raised above the arena. The increasing sophistication of weaponry from contestant robots – most notably demonstrated by Hypno-Disc in Series 3 – as well as arena hazards prompted producers to enclose the arena entirely in a perspex box 20 feet (6.1 m) high from Series 4 onwards, to protect the audience and production team from debris.

In early 2004, the Robot Wars arena was purchased from the television production firm Mentorn by a company called Robot Arenas Ltd., based in the UK, an organization set up by a past competitor in Robot Wars to continue the sport of robot combat in the UK. The arena – valued originally at £11,000 – was sold for scrap in 2005 for £250 by the new owners of the former RAF Newton air base, where the arena was housed. A suit filed against RAF Newton by Robot Arenas Ltd. found that RAF Newton had acted reasonably in the matter and owed no compensation to Robot Arenas Ltd.

In 2016, a new arena was constructed in a warehouse in Renfrew, on the outskirts of Glasgow, for use in the rebooted series. This arena is 15 metres (49 ft) square, with a 6 mm (0.24 in) steel floor and higher bulletproof walls, making it harder for robots to be thrown out of the arena.

=== Hazards ===
Throughout Robot Wars' run, arena booby-traps were introduced and amended. Generally, traps which proved ineffective were omitted in later series, however some traps proved to be a success (such as the Pit of Oblivion, Floor Flipper and the Drop Zone) and were retained. The assorted traps in the arena that changed from one series the next included:

- Arena Sidebars – The First Wars Only – These were parts of the arena side fence that were on the floor. These trapped robots and potentially immobilised them if they could not drive off.
- The Patrol Zone (commonly known as PZs) – The First Wars only – Four large squares in the corners of the arena marked with striped tape, each occupied by one House Robot and a booby-trap. Once a competitor robot entered one of these zones, it was open to attack by the House Robot within. The Patrol Zones were much like the CPZ's that appeared in later series but were much larger.
- Floor grilles – The First Wars Only – Grille floor panels that, like the arena sidebars mentioned above, were designed to trap robots and not allow them to drive off. Proved much more effective than the sidebars. (similar to the flame pit introduced in the second wars)
- Floor spikes – The First Wars to The Third Wars and Series 8 onwards – These were pneumatic spikes located in several positions on the arena floor that came up whenever a robot drove over them. They trapped robots and on occasion flipped them. They were removed for Series 4 after causing many upsets during The Third Wars, where robots currently winning battles would be overturned and then lose. This most notably happened during Heat B when Behemoth was flipped, could not self-right and its opponent Pitbull won by default. For Series 8, a group of five large spikes form one of the four main traps of the arena. They are powerful and large enough to lift and trap robots for a brief moment (as happened to Bonk in the opening episode), but are not as fast as their predecessors. In theory, this will avoid the sort of upsets seen in Series 3. One spike 'hole' is capable of emitting sparks.
- The Perimeter Patrol Zones (commonly known as PPZs) – The Second Wars only – A narrow band around the perimeter of the arena that replaced the Patrol Zones. A competitor robot that entered this area was open to attack by any or all of the House Robots stationed there.
- The Side Patrol Zones (commonly known as SPZs (Pinball Only)) – The Second Wars to The Fourth Wars – the House Robots guard three tyre targets in the sides of the arena during the Pinball Warrior Tournament (Two of the side tyre targets score 50 points and one scores 75 points if any tyre target is pressed).
- The Pit of Oblivion – The Second Wars onwards – Arguably the arena's most iconic feature, this was a 4-foot (1.2 m) square hole in the arena floor, painted black on the inside and partially filled with old tyres. If a robot drove, fell, or was pushed into the Pit, it would be instantly eliminated. In The Second Wars, pits were added to both lanes of The Gauntlet. For The Third Wars the Pit was open during the first two rounds of each heat, then covered during the heat final and following matches. In The Fourth Wars, the Pit was redesigned, with a yellow-and-black chevron-tape outline and was covered until halfway into a battle, whereupon it would "descend". From its very first appearance in The Second Wars, the Pit included a small pyrotechnic "explosion" that formed a large ball of white smoke. This would activate when a robot fell into the Pit, primarily used to show that a competitor had fallen in. This was changed to a small firework explosion for The Third Wars but the smoke returned for The Fourth Wars and remained until the end. From Extreme 1 onwards there was a device on the arena wall that competitor or house robots could use to activate the pit opening. In Extreme and The Fifth Wars that device was a tyre. For The Sixth Wars the tyre was replaced by a metal bumper. The tyre returned in Extreme 2 and remained for the remainder of the shows' run. The pit was enlarged and given an LED decoration on the inside for the eighth series, with the pyrotechnic no longer used. Since Series 9, the pyrotechnics have returned to the Pit.
- Flame Pit – The Second Wars onwards – A large square grill located close to the right bottom corner of the arena resembling a kitchen stove. Used to set fire to flammable robots and damage electronics. For the eighth series, this was moved to the upper left corner of the arena. (similar to the floor grills which only appeared in the first wars)
- The Corner Patrol Zones (commonly known as CPZs) – The Third Wars onwards – the House Robots were now confined to the four corners of the arena much like in The First Wars. Which house robot was used in which battle was defined by a rota system but would also sometimes depend on if a house robot was being repaired. In The Fourth Wars, the house robots switched to a rota system of Shunt, Matilda, Sgt. Bash and Dead Metal. Sir Killalot consistently appeared every round excepting battles 3 & 4 of the War of Independence when the original 4 house robots occupy all the CPZs. From The Fifth Wars and Extreme 1 onwards only two house robots were allowed in the arena at a time and this moved in a rota through all of the machines. However some House Robots did not appear in a show or on some occasions missed several shows before making an appearance. For Series 8, the CPZs are larger and L-shaped. The house robots no longer attack competitors who enter any CPZ, but stick to guarding their own and can still attack robots that have been immobilised.
- The Floor Flipper – The Third Wars onwards – A powerful pneumatic flipper set into the floor resembling an aircraft carrier catapult, capable of throwing a robot across the arena. It was generally only used on robots that had already been defeated, but was occasionally fired during events such as the House Robot Rebellion. When originally introduced, it just looked like a part of the arena floor. For The Fourth Wars the flipper was given a yellow/black paint scheme similar to the redesigned Pit of Oblivion. For Extreme 1/Series 5 the power of the flipper increased, allowing it to hurl even the heaviest robots into the air and flip featherweight robots out of the arena. For Series 8, this is no longer used as a coup de grace for defeated robots, but fires independently during a fight. It is positioned diagonally on the floor and is capable not only of launching robots into the air but also trapping robots as it closes.
- Red & Blue Perimeters (Sumo & Tag Team Terror only) – The Fourth Wars only – The Red Perimeter zone is for two robots in the red tag team and the Blue Perimeter zone is for two robots in the blue tag team.
- Angle Grinders – The Third Wars and Extreme 1 to The Seventh Wars – Abrasive grinding wheels built into the arena railings. The grinders were replaced with small pneumatic spikes in The Fourth Wars but brought back from Extreme 1 onwards.
- Pneumatic Spikes – The Fourth Wars only – As mentioned above, they replaced the Angle Grinders but proved ineffective so were omitted after one series.
- CO_{2} geysers – The Fifth Wars and Extreme 1 onwards – High pressure CO_{2} outlets designed to cause internal damage to robots, but were more useful for extinguishing fires.
- The Drop Zone – The Fifth Wars and Extreme 1 to The Seventh Wars – A square on the arena floor where heavy objects (television sets, ocean buoys, refrigerators, washing machines, etc.) fell from the top of the arena. Like the Floor Flipper, it was only used on robots that were already immobile. It was actually first used in Series 6 and Extreme 2, although the spot where the object would fall, a black square with a yellow 'X' shape across it, although it first appeared in The Fifth Wars and Extreme 1. Viewers did not know the purpose of this at the time. It is believed it was due to be used in Extreme 1 and The Fifth Wars Semi-Finals and Grand Final but technical difficulties meant it was abandoned.
- The Disc of Doom – The Sixth Wars and Extreme 2 only – A circular spinning panel set into the arena floor activated by a buffer similar to the pit release. This trap was used to disrupt a robot's driving and worked well on lighter competitors, but proved ineffective against Heavyweight robots. It first appeared in both The Sixth Wars and Extreme 2 but was removed for The Seventh Wars to be replaced by The Dial of Doom in the near future.
- The Dial of Doom/Doom Dial – Series 9 to Series 10. A dial that will activate when the arena tyre is pressed. If the dial swings left, it will open up the pit and if the dial swings right, it will activate "Rogue House Robot" which allows a house robot to leave the CPZ and attack a competitor robot for up to 10 seconds. Additionally, from the Tenth Wars, swinging right may trigger "The Fog of War" in which the arena is filled with CO_{2} for 10 seconds, obscuring the robots from view.

== Competitors and results ==
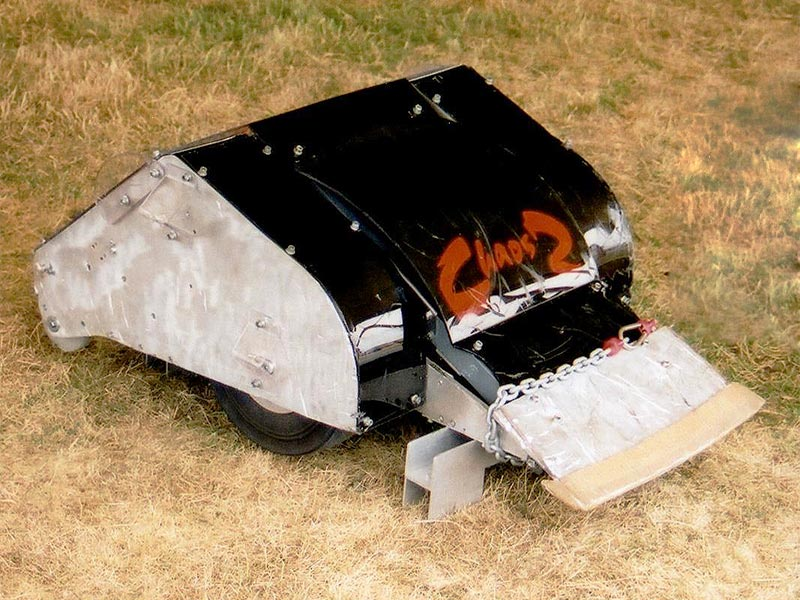
Chaos 2 was the only robot to be the show's British Champion twice and the first to flip opponent robots over the fence and out of the arena.

Domestic Championships results
Series	Winner	Grand Finalists		
1	Roadblock	Bodyhammer, Robot The Bruce, Recyclopse, Cunning Plan, T.R.A.C.I.E.		
Series	Winner	Runner-up	Third place	Fourth place
2	Panic Attack	Cassius	Roadblock	Killertron
3	Chaos 2	Hypno-Disc	Fire Storm	Steg-O-Saw-Us
4	Chaos 2	Pussycat	Stinger	Hypno-Disc
5	Razer	Bigger Brother	Firestorm 3	Hypno-Disc
6	Tornado	Razer	Firestorm 4	Terrorhurtz
7	Typhoon 2	Storm 2	Tornado	X-Terminator
8	Apollo	Carbide	TR2	Thor
9	Carbide	Eruption	Ironside 3	Aftershock
10	Eruption	Carbide	Behemoth/Nuts 2	Magnetar/Rapid

Special Championships Results
Championship	Winner		Runner-up	
International League Championship	Razer (England)		Diotoir (Republic of Ireland)	
Championship	Winner	Runner-up	Semi-Finalists	
First World Championship	Razer (England)	Behemoth (England)	101 (England)	Diotoir (Republic of Ireland)
First Celebrity Special	Pussycat (Adam Woodyatt)	Diotoir (Vic Reeves)	Gemini (Anthea Turner & Wendy Turner)	Sir Chromalot (Shane Lynch)
Championship	Winner	Runner-up	Third place	Fourth place
Tag Team Terror	King B3 & 101	Firestorm 2 & Scorpion	Bigger Brother & Plunderbird 4	X-Terminator 2 & Invertabrat
Championship	Winner		Runner-up	
Annihilator North	Spikasaurus		Dominator 2	
Annihilator South	Razer		Onslaught	
Championship	Winner	Runner-up	Semi-Finalists	
War of Independence	Mortis (UK)	Frenzy (USA)	Ming 2 (UK)	Panic Attack (UK)
Second World Championship	Razer (UK)	Drillzilla (USA)	Manta (USA)	Tornado (UK)
The Forces Special	Anvil (Royal Air Force)	Mega-Hurts (Royal Navy)	Oblark (Fire Brigade)	Sub-Version (Submariners)
Championship	Winners		Semi-Finalists	
UK vs. Germany	Fluffy (UK)	Das Gepäck (Germany)	259 (UK)	Delldog (Germany)
Championship	Winner		Runner-up	
Annihilator	Kan-Opener		Ripper	
Championship	Winner	Runner-up	Semi-Finalists	
All-Stars	Pussycat	Dantomkia	Kat 3	Panic Attack
Third World Championship	Storm 2 (UK)	Supernova (Sri Lanka)	Crushtacean (South Africa)	Tough As Nails (Netherlands)
Championship	Winners		Runners-up	
Battle of the Stars	Arena Cleaner (Scott Mills & Chris Stark)	Kadeena Machina (Kadeena Cox)	The Cat (Suzi Perry)	Robo Savage (Robbie Savage)
Championship	Winners		Runners-up	
World Series	UK (Apollo, Terrorhurtz, Sabretooth, Gabriel 2)	UK (Eruption, Thor, Concussion, Big Nipper)	Rest of the World (Diotoir, Cobra, Rabid M8, TMHWK)	Rest of the World (Cathadh, Terror Turtle, THE BASH / Tough As Nails*, Weber)

- Note: After THE BASH was found to be irreparable in the World Series after its first and only battle, it was directly replaced by Tough As Nails.

== Merchandise ==
=== Toys (from Logistix Kids & Hexbug) ===
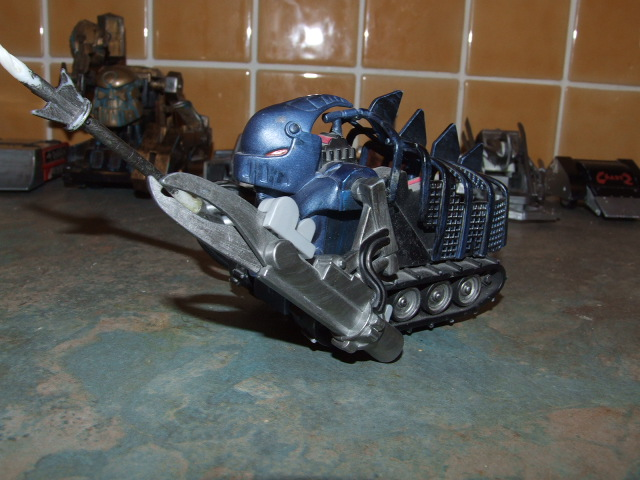
A Sir Killalot toy

Pullback and Friction toys were made of all the House Robots, with the exception of Cassius Chrome as the toys from Logistix Kids had stopped production when it was introduced for The Seventh Wars and the toys would have resumed production by Series 8, 9 or 10, but this did not happen until Hexbug took over and did so rather late in 2018 after Series 10 ended. There were also pullback and ripcord toys of the Series 3, 4, 5, 6, Extreme 1 and Extreme 2 Competitor Robots, with the exception of Apollo, Behemoth, Carbide, Eruption, Kronic the Wedgehog, Mute, Road Block, Storm 2 and Typhoon 2 as Hexbug took over from Logistix Kids which are Chaos 2, Dantomkia, Firestorm, Hypno-Disc, Panic Attack, Pussycat, Razer, Stinger, Tornado, Wheely Big Cheese and X-Terminator 2. Each came with an accessory.

There were remote controlled versions of Shunt, Matilda, Sir Killalot and Growler. There were also smaller remote control battlers, which had "immobilisation spots" on the rear of the toy. Sgt. Bash and the competitor robot Tornado were the only two made. These were smaller than the other remote control robots mentioned above.

There were customisable kit toys of the House Robot Matilda and competitors Hypno-Disc and Panic Attack. A Sergeant Bash pitstop kit was prototyped but never released.

Minibots were a series of small die-cast replica robots. The range included all of the Series 3, 4, 5 and Extreme 1 House Robots along with competitor robots Chaos 2, Dominator 2, Firestorm, Gemini, Hypno-Disc, Mega Morg, Panic Attack, Plunderbird 5, Pussycat, Razer, Suicidal Tendencies, Tornado, Wheely Big Cheese, Wild Thing and X-Terminator 2. They had an interactive replica arena and two additional playsets.

=== Home media ===
Several VHS videos were released of the show. These included "The First Great War" a look at the making of Series 1, "The First World Championship" which was released exclusively on video and the "Ultimate Warrior Collection" featuring exclusive access to the teams of Chaos 2, Hypno-Disc and Razer, along with footage of their battles. Along the same lines an "Ultimate Archive Collection" was released showing exclusive footage of the House Robots and their operators along with some of their greatest battles and most embarrassing moments.

The Ultimate Warrior Collection and Ultimate Archive Collection were also released on DVD. The footage and content remained the same as the VHS releases. Series 8 was released on DVD and Blu-ray on 29 August 2016, making it the first full series of Robot Wars to be released on home media. It was later released digitally. The Complete Compendium 2017 contained Series 9 and 10, along with the "Battle of the Stars" specials, were released on 11 December 2017 as a 5-disc DVD box set.

=== Video games ===
Robot Wars: Metal Mayhem is the first game based on the show, released on Game Boy Color in 2000. It was followed in 2001 by Robot Wars: Arenas of Destruction on PlayStation 2 and Windows and Robot Wars: Advanced Destruction on Game Boy Advance. After the first three titles sold over 250,000 copies, a fourth and final game, released on Game Boy Advance, Windows, and Xbox in 2002 was called Robot Wars: Extreme Destruction.

=== Other ===
A large array of other merchandise was produced due to the success of the show. Items available included mugs, glasses, mobile phone covers, toiletries, stationery, clocks, watches, bedding, curtains and clothing. The show even produced an unsuccessful single, which peaked at number 51 in the UK singles charts in December 2000, called "Sir Killalot Vs. Robo Babe – Robot Wars (Android Love)". A custom made game officially licensed under Robot Wars LLC was started on in October 2013, using the Robot Arena 2 video game as the base engine. It featured many robots from the TV series as well as robots competing in the newer live events. It also included the original Robot Wars arena and various live arenas. It was released to the public in September 2015 and an updated version which included more robots was released in February 2016. A smaller update was released in January 2017, adding two new robots. Another update came in August 2017 which added the new Robot Wars arena from the current series and another new arena as well as some unreleased robots from the beta and robots that were due to be released in a cancelled expansion. It is only available for Microsoft Windows.

== Transmissions ==
All episodes were announced by Jonathan Pearce.

=== Domestic series ===
Series	Start date	End date	Network	Hosts		Judges (Note: For series 5 and Extreme series 1, Martin Smith, Myra Wilson and Mat Irvine took it in turns.)				Commentator	Episodes
Original series
1	20 February 1998	27 March 1998	BBC Two	Jeremy Clarkson	Philippa Forrester	Noel Sharkey	Eric Dickinson		Adam Harper	Jonathan Pearce	6
2	6 November 1998	5 March 1999	BBC Two	Craig Charles	Philippa Forrester	Noel Sharkey	Eric Dickinson		Adam Harper	Jonathan Pearce	15
3	3 December 1999	21 April 2000	BBC Two	Craig Charles	Philippa Forrester	Noel Sharkey	Martin Smith		Adam Harper	Jonathan Pearce	19
4	22 September 2000	23 February 2001	BBC Two/BBC One (Note: The Celebrity Robot Wars special was broadcast on BBC One, the only episode of the series to do so.)	Craig Charles	Julia Reed	Noel Sharkey	Martin Smith		Myra Wilson	Jonathan Pearce	19
5	6 May 2002	27 May 2002	BBC Choice/BBC Two	Craig Charles	Philippa Forrester	Noel Sharkey	Martin Smith	Myra Wilson	Mat Irvine	Jonathan Pearce	15
6	16 September 2002	4 October 2002	BBC Choice/BBC Two	Craig Charles	Philippa Forrester	Noel Sharkey	Martin Smith		Mat Irvine	Jonathan Pearce	15
7	2 November 2003	7 March 2004	Channel 5	Craig Charles	Jayne Middlemiss	Noel Sharkey	Martin Smith		Mat Irvine	Jonathan Pearce	19
Revived series
8	24 July 2016	28 August 2016	BBC Two	Dara Ó Briain	Angela Scanlon	Noel Sharkey	Sethu Vijayakumar		Lucy Rogers	Jonathan Pearce	6
9	5 March 2017	16 April 2017	BBC Two	Dara Ó Briain	Angela Scanlon	Noel Sharkey	Sethu Vijayakumar		Lucy Rogers	Jonathan Pearce	6
10	22 October 2017	3 December 2017	BBC Two	Dara Ó Briain	Angela Scanlon	Noel Sharkey	Sethu Vijayakumar		Lucy Rogers	Jonathan Pearce	6

=== Extreme series ===
All Extreme episodes premiered on BBC Choice.

Series	Start date	End date	Hosts		Judges				Episodes
1	8 October 2001	26 October 2001	Craig Charles	Julia Reed	Noel Sharkey	Martin Smith	Myra Wilson	Mat Irvine	15
2	13 January 2003	7 February 2003	Craig Charles	Philippa Forrester	Noel Sharkey	Martin Smith		Mat Irvine	16

=== Specials ===
Date aired	Title
31 December 1998	The Making of Robot Wars
12 March 1999	The Grudge Matches
19 March 1999	The Best of Robot Wars
15 September 2000	International League Championship
27 December 2000	Celebrity Special Championship
28 December 2000	Tag Team Terror
29 December 2000	Northern Annihilator
30 December 2000	Southern Annihilator
31 December 2000	War of Independence
16 November 2001	The First World Championship
20 December 2001	The Second World Championship
21 December 2001	Forces Special
10 January 2003	UK vs. Germany
14 March 2004	Annihilator
21 March 2004	All-Stars
28 March 2004	The Third World Championship
11 July 2016	Meet the House Robots
28 December 2016	Battle of the Stars: Episode 1
29 December 2016	Battle of the Stars: Episode 2
31 December 2017	World Series: Episode 1
7 January 2018	World Series: Episode 2

== See also ==
- Robot combat – includes types of robots
- BattleBots
- Robotica (TV Series)
- Robot Combat League
- Robot Fighting League – competitions in the U.S., Canada and Brazil.
- Techno Games
- Robot Wars grand finalists
- Survival Research Laboratories
- Airmageddon
