= BattleBots: Beyond the BattleBox =

2002 video game

- Developers: Cave+Barn Studios; Pipe Dream Interactive
- Publishers: NA: Majesco; EU: Vivendi Universal Games
- Platform: Game Boy Advance
- Release: NA: December 10, 2002; EU: June 20, 2003
- Genre: Action
- Modes: Single-player, multiplayer

BattleBots: Beyond the BattleBox is a video game based on the BattleBots license for the Game Boy Advance. It was developed by Cave+Barn Studios and Pipe Dream Interactive and was published by Majesco. Players create and manage a team of BattleBots.

The game was reissued as BattleBots: Design & Destroy starting from August 31, 2003, in order to capitalize on rival robot combat title Robot Arena 2.

== Gameplay ==
BattleBots: Beyond the BattleBox is an action game. Players control a radio-controlled robot and battle it out with other robots to win. The main game mode is Tournament mode, where the player competes in four matches depending on the weight class and must win all four to win an award. The player can also win sponsorships, to earn more money.

There are sixteen real-life robots in the game.

== Reception ==
BattleBots: Beyond the Battlebox

Aggregate score
Aggregator	Score
Metacritic	53/100

Review scores
Publication	Score
GameSpot	5.5/10
GameSpy	2/5
GameZone	6/10
IGN	5/10
Nintendo Power	2.9/5

BattleBots: Beyond the BattleBox received "mixed" reviews according to the review aggregation website Metacritic. IGN said that the only good thing was that Carmen Electra was not in the game.

== Sequel ==
BattleBots: Design & Destroy
- Developers: Cave+Barn Studios; Pipe Dream Interactive
- Publisher: Majesco
- Platform: Game Boy Advance
- Release: August 31, 2003
- Genre: Action
- Modes: Single-player, multiplayer

BattleBots: Design & Destroy was released on August 31, 2003 for the Game Boy Advance. It was stated that the game was the sequel to BattleBots: Beyond the BattleBox, but it is the same game released under a different name, albeit with some bugs fixed. It was possible that the game was released to pick up sales from gamers mistaking it for the PC game Robot Arena 2: Design & Destroy.

=== Reception ===
Battlebots: Design & Destroy

Aggregate score
Aggregator	Score
Metacritic	45/100

Review scores
Publication	Score
GameSpot	4/10
Nintendo Power	2.3/5

Design & Destroy received "generally unfavorable reviews" according to Metacritic.
