= Robot Wars: Metal Mayhem =

2000 video game

- Developer(s): Tiertex Design Studios
- Publisher(s): BBC Multimedia
- Platform(s): Game Boy Color
- Release: EU: 7 December 2000
- Genre(s): Action
- Mode(s): Single-player

Robot Wars: Metal Mayhem is the first video game based on the British game show Robot Wars. It was released exclusively for Game Boy Color on 7 December 2000. It was the first of four games based on the show, with the first three selling over 250,000 copies. The game was based on the third series of the show, and competitors such as its champion Chaos 2 feature in the game.

In the game, a competitor robot from the series, or a robot created by the player, is entered into combat against a robot controlled by the game. A bout finishes when one robot's health bar is fully depleted. In the Tournament Mode, the first robot to win two bouts advances. The game features the arena obstacles and House Robots of the series, and in other modes, a selection of mini-games based on the show's side events.
