= Jonathan Pearce (commentator) =

British football commentator

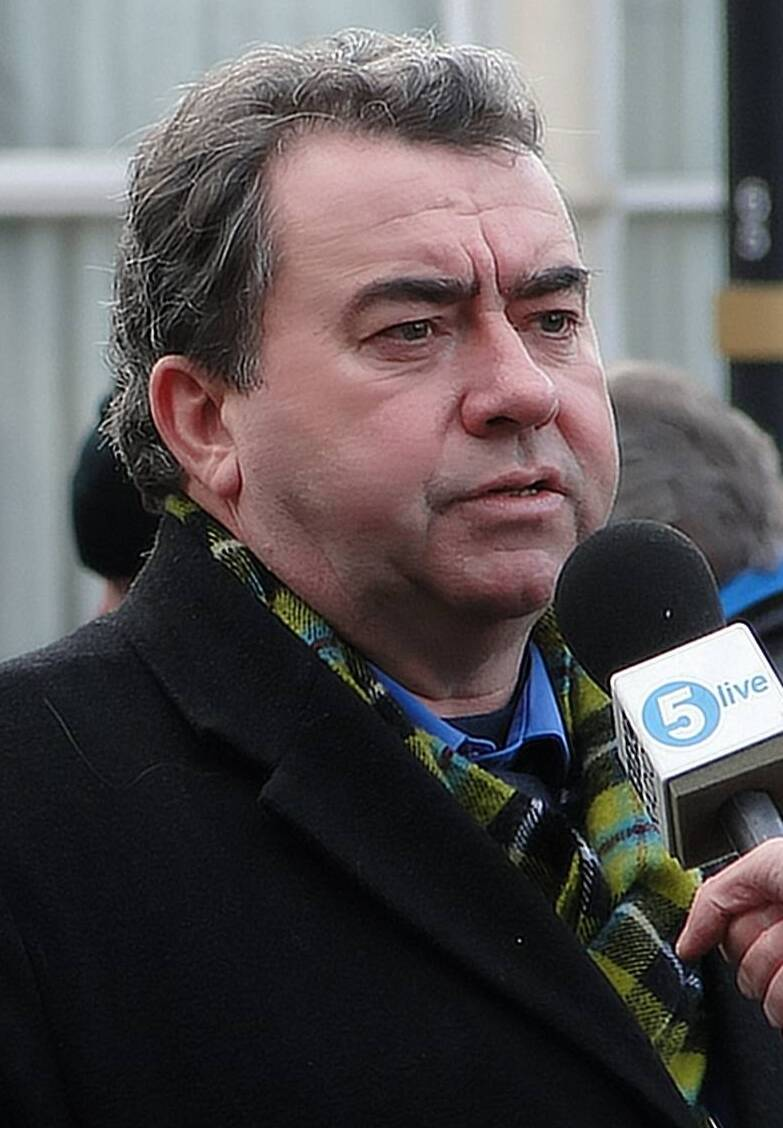
- Pearce in 2010
- Born: Jonathan Mark Pearce; 23 December 1959 (age 66); Plymouth, Devon, England
- Education: Birmingham University, National Broadcasting School
- Occupation: Football commentator
- Years active: 1980–present
- Employer(s): BBC, TNT Sports

Jonathan Mark Pearce (born 23 December 1959) is an English sports commentator on football for many radio and TV stations including the BBC and TNT Sports. His career in sports commentating includes spells at BBC Radio Bristol (1980–1983), Radio West Bristol (1983–1984), Southern Sound Radio (1984), Radio West/GWR Bristol (1984–1986), BBC Radio 2 Local Radio Network London (1986–1987), Capital Radio, Capital Gold Sports (1987–), The Footballers Football Show (1991–1993); Sky TV (1991–97); Granada Talk TV (1996–1997); Channel 5 (1997–2004), BBC Radio 5 Live (2002–present); London Weekend Television (1997), and Match of the Day (2004 to present) and TNT Sports (2013–present).

== Early life ==
Pearce was born, six weeks premature, on 23 December 1959, in Plymouth, Devon. In his first four years, he was raised in Wadebridge, Cornwall, when he was seven years old, his family moved to Bristol, just before he started in junior school. Pearce's father was a senior lecturer in electrical engineering, and worked with Bristol City manager Alan Dicks, educating junior players forming tactics from videos of games that Pearce had recorded. This made Bristol City the first club in Europe to use videos of games for tactical purposes, also exposing Pearce to the world of media.

Pearce aspired to become a footballer for Bristol City but his potential footballing career ended prematurely when he broke his leg at age 15. As a second year undergraduate, he secured a commentating job with BBC Radio Bristol. He studied English at Birmingham University, and attended the National Broadcasting School in London, Awarded the annual scholarship for an intensive post graduate journalism and broadcasting course.

== Career ==
His broadcasting career began at BBC Radio Bristol (1980–1983), with his first match commentary being Bristol Rovers against Exeter City in the League Cup. He joined Radio West Bristol (1983–1984), Southern Sound Radio (1984), Radio West/GWR Bristol (1984–1986), BBC Radio 2 Local Radio Network London (1986–1987).

In 1987, he moved to London and joined Capital Radio, where he helped set up Capital Gold Sports on Capital Gold, in collusion with six London clubs. He commentated for Capital Gold for fifteen years. During that time he met Princess Diana, Princess Anne and Bobby Moore. Pearce, and fellow commentator John Motson, were described as 'broadcasting greats' by West Ham United after the death of footballer legend Bobby Moore.

He was a presenter for Sky TV's The Footballers Football Show (1991–1993); Was a freelance reporter, commentator and television presenter for Sky TV 1991–97; A sports presenter for Granada Talk TV (1996–1997); A football commentator for Channel 5 (1997–2004), also a football commentator for BBC Radio 5 Live (2002–2005); And in Up for the Cup for London Weekend Television in 1997. He starred in Jonathan Pearce's Football Night for Channel 5 from 2000–2004; Was a commentator for Match of the Day (2004 to present).

Between 1998 and 2004, Pearce had also commentated on Robot Wars the TV series, on BBC Two and Channel 5. He reprised this role for the rebooted 2016 series.

=== Channel 5, BBC and BT Sport ===
When Channel 5 (known as Five for some time) was launched in 1997, Pearce was signed as their lead football commentator. At the time, his excitable style of commentary received some criticism. He joined BBC Radio 5 Live in 2002, and was part of their 2002 FIFA World Cup commentary team. He presented the station's midweek sports programme, Sport on Five, from 2003 until 2005 and became a commentator for BBC television on Match of the Day from 2004 to present.

He also lent his voice to a few video games, such as Sensible Soccer, the Ubisoft football game Action Soccer, and UEFA Striker. Away from football, he was also the commentator on Robot Wars and Hole in the Wall.

Pearce joined the BBC's Match of the Day team in 2004. He is one of the BBC's front-line commentators alongside number one commentator Guy Mowbray, Steve Wilson and Simon Brotherton. During his twenty years with BBC Sport, Pearce has commentated on live games from the FA Cup, League Cup, and Championship. He has covered five World Cups (2006, 2010, 2014, 2018 and 2022), four European Championships (2008, 2012, 2016 and 2020), three Women's World Cups (2015, 2019, and 2023) and two Women's European Championships (2022 and 2025).

Pearce joined BT Sport (now TNT Sports) in 2013, where he regularly commentates on Champions League and Ligue 1 fixtures.

== Written journalism ==
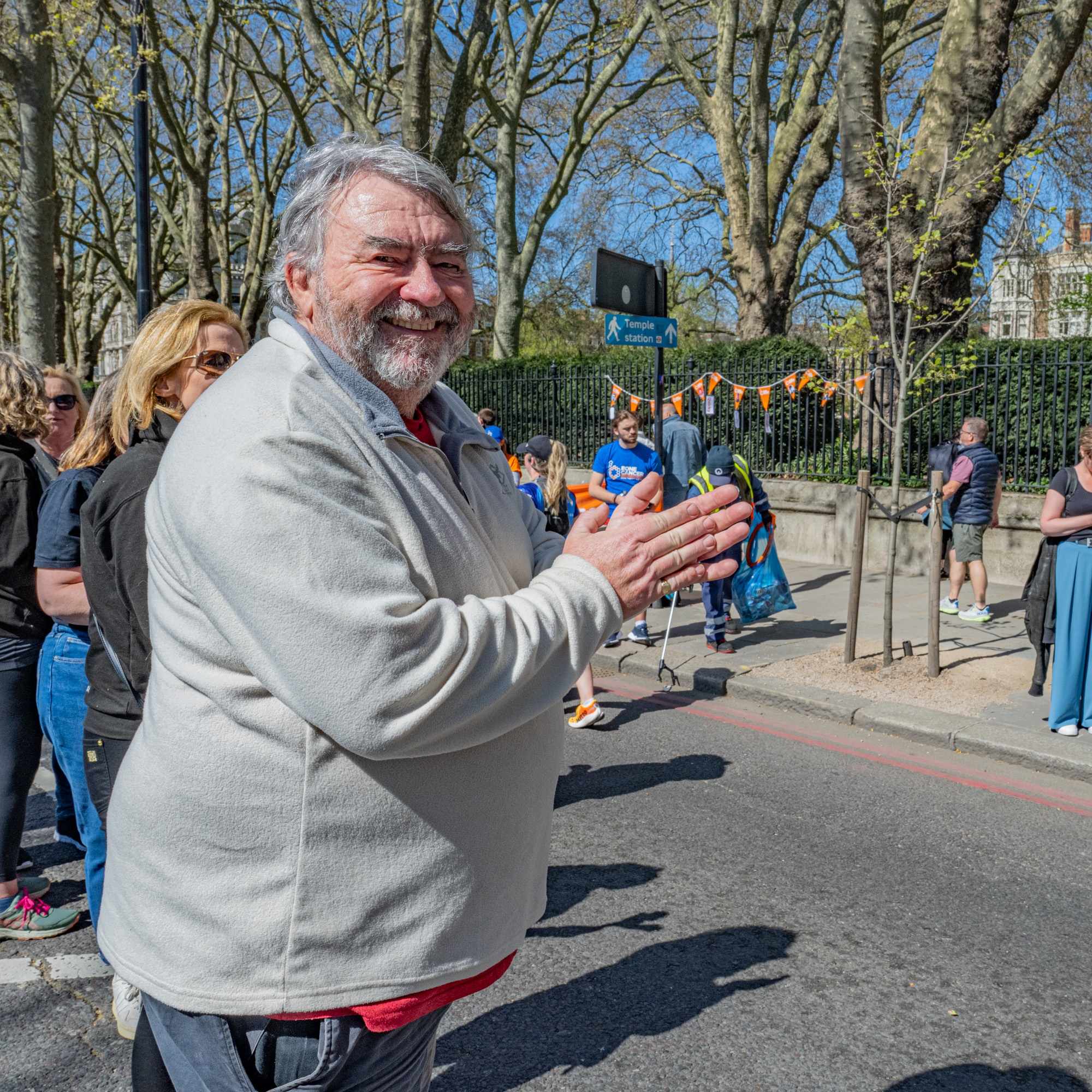
Supporting The Lily Foundation, London, April 2025

- 2002-2008 – Sunday Mirror – Jonathan Pearce Sport Column
- 2013-2014 – Nuts (magazine) – regular contributor
- Present – BBC Sport website - regular blogger and contributor

== Personal life ==
Pearce is a long-time Bristol City fan. He lives in Hassocks, West Sussex, where he is the former chair of the junior section of Hassocks F.C.

Pearce is the founding president and now patron of the Lily Foundation, the UK's leading mitochondrial disease charity. The foundation was set up after Pearce's 8-month-old niece died of the disease.

== Awards ==
Awards: New York Radio Festival Gold Medal 1990, 1992 and 1999 (Silver Medal 1991, Bronze Medal 1993), Best Sports Prog of the Year Sony Radio Awards 1990 and 1992, Best Sports Commentator Sony Radio Awards 1996, Variety Club Independent Radio Personality of the Year 1996.
