= Chaos 2 =

Combat robot from Robot Wars

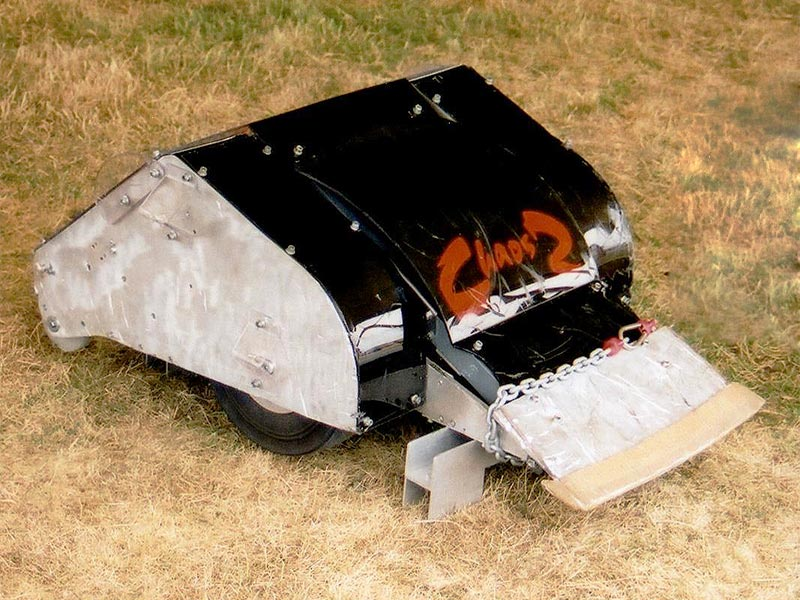
- Chaos 2 from Series 3 onwards

Statistics
- Height: 0.42 m (1.4 ft)
- Width: 0.63 m (2.1 ft)
- Depth: 0.92 m (3.0 ft)
- Weight: 84 kg (185 lb)
- Weight class: Heavyweight
- Primary weapon: Flipper
- Maximum speed: 12 mph (19 km/h)
- Turning circle: 0 m (0 ft)
- Ground clearance: 70 mm (2.8 in)
- Power source: 2 × 1kW motors

Team
- Team name: Team Chaos
- Team members: George Francis; Ian Swann; Richard Swann
- Location: Ipswich
- Country of origin: United Kingdom

Chaos 2 is a combat robot from the UK television series Robot Wars, designed and built by self-employed mechanic George Francis, from Ipswich, and operated by Team Chaos. Twice winner of the UK Robot Wars Championship and the only robot with that distinction, it was the first robot to use its flipper to throw its opponents out of the arena altogether. This machine was also the first to defeat Hypno-Disc in Series 3. Its flipper is commonly considered to be one of the most powerful in Robot Wars, although it is not as powerful as the catapult-style flipper of Wheely Big Cheese. However, its weapon is superior in terms of efficiency, but has a limited supply of CO_{2}, which provides the power for the weapon. The robot has been reincarnated several times over the years, previously appearing as Robot The Bruce and Chaos. Its flipper was also used as a self-righting mechanism when the robot was inverted, flipping the entire robot over in a half-somersault so it could continue fighting.

Chaos 2 is an inaugural member of the Combat Robot Hall of Fame. It also has its own pullback toy, pullback minibot and DVD.

Team Chaos had a small rivalry with Team Mace. The two teams first met in the Heat Final of Series 2. Mace pushed Chaos into Matilda, who flipped Chaos over. Chaos attempted to self-right, but was unable to because Francis and Cutter had forgotten to fit pieces of plastic on the back of the robot to help it self-right. In the next series, the teams met again in the second round of the Series Semi-Finals. This time however, Chaos 2 flipped Mace 2 over, and this time Mace 2 was unable to self-right, and Chaos 2 was declared the winner, to go through to the Grand Final. Gemini, Team Mace's entry for Series 4 and 5, never faced Chaos 2 (despite the likelihood increasing due to Gemini's heat being placed among the first eight in Series 4, when it should not have been), so the scores stay at one victory each for the two teams.

Chaos 2 also holds the record of being the only robot to successfully defend its title in the series (winning the Series 3 and 4 championships in a row), as well as being the first robot to remove a competitor from the arena during battle (doing this with Firestorm in Series 3, though not intentionally).

== Statistics ==
| Weight: | 84 kg (during its last appearance in Robot Wars Extreme: Series 2) |
| Dimensions: | 38 cm × 92 cm × 72 cm |
| Clearance: | 7 cm |
| Power: | electric motors |
| Weapons: | powerful pneumatic CO_{2} powered flipper |

== Battle summary ==
=== Series 3 ===
UK Championship

| Round | Opponent | Result |
|---|---|---|
| Heat E Round 1 | Crocodilotron | Won |
| Heat E Round 2 | Sonic | Won |
| Heat E Final | The Big Cheese | Won |
| Semi-Finals Round 1 | Trident | Won |
| Semi-Finals Round 2 | Mace 2 | Won |
| Grand Final Eliminator | Firestorm | Won |
| Grand Final | Hypno-Disc | Won |

First World Championship

Chaos 2 represented England in this competition.

| Round | Opponent | Result |
|---|---|---|
| Round 1 | Killerhurtz (Czech Republic) | Won |
| Round 2 | Razer (England) | Lost |

=== Series 4 ===
UK Championship

| Round | Opponent | Result |
|---|---|---|
| Heat A Eliminator | Atomic, Indefatigable | Qualified |
| Heat A Semi-Final | Medusa 2000 | Won |
| Heat A Final | Atomic | Won |
| Semi-Finals Round 1 | Steg 2 | Won |
| Semi-Finals Round 2 | Tornado | Won |
| Grand Final Eliminator | Stinger | Won |
| Grand Final | Pussycat | Won |

Northern Annihilator

| Round | Opponent | Result |
|---|---|---|
| Round 1 | Spikasaurus, Stinger, Killerhurtz, Dominator 2, Suicidal Tendencies | Eliminated |

=== Robot Wars Extreme - Series 1 ===
| Round | Opponent | Result |
|---|---|---|
| International Mayhem | Alien Destructor (Netherlands) and Philliper (Belgium) | Won |
| Flipper Frenzy | Thermidor 2, Wheely Big Cheese, Bigger Brother | Lost |
| Challenge Belt | Tornado | Lost |

All Stars Championship

| Round | Opponent | Result |
|---|---|---|
| Round 1 | X-Terminator | Won |
| Round 2 | Wheely Big Cheese | Won |
| Semi-Finals | Tornado | Lost |

Second World Championship

Chaos 2 represented the UK in this competition.

| Round | Opponent | Result |
|---|---|---|
| Round 1 | Manta (USA), Mastiff (Italy), Ansgar (Germany) | Eliminated |

=== Series 5 ===
UK Championship

| Round | Opponent | Result |
|---|---|---|
| Heat A Eliminator | Storm Force | Won |
| Heat A Semi-Final | The Steel Avenger | Won |
| Heat A Final | S.M.I.D.S.Y. | Won |
| Semi-Finals Round 1 | Wild Thing | Won |
| Semi-Finals Round 2 | Bigger Brother | Lost |

=== Series 6 ===
UK Championship

| Round | Opponent | Result |
|---|---|---|
| Heat C Round 1 | Destructosaur, Mighty Mouse, Iron-Awe 2 | Qualified |
| Heat C Round 2 | Crushtacean | Won |
| Heat C Final | Dantomkia | Lost |

=== Robot Wars Extreme - Series 2 ===
All Stars Championship

| Round | Opponent | Result |
|---|---|---|
| Heat B Round 1 | Razer, 13 Black | Eliminated |

This was its final fight. However, after this loss, it received an overhaul to bring it back to working order. Chaos 2 continued to fight in live events for a while before becoming a static display, its last appearance being in 2007. As of 2019, George Francis still has Chaos 2 in his possession.

| Preceded by Panic Attack | UK Robot Wars; Reigning Champion (Series 3, 4) | Succeeded by Razer |
