= Self-righting mechanism =

Device for re-righting a robot

In robot combat, a self-righting mechanism or srimech (sometimes spelled as srimec or shrimech) is a device used to re-right a robot should it get flipped. BioHazard of BattleBots was the first robot to self-right.

== Military applications ==
As of 2016, the U.S. Army Research Laboratory (ARL), based at Aberdeen Proving Grounds, MD, developed self-righting robots for bomb defusal and reconnaissance. Listed as a 2004–2020 effort, the prototype was called CRAM, for compressible robot with articulated mechanisms. ARL scientists were led by Chad Kessens, and collaborated with researchers from the University of California, Berkeley, and Johns Hopkins University to develop a prototype.

Cockroach exoskeletons inspired researchers to manufacture a robot that can move around rapidly in both open and confined spaces with self-righting capabilities.

In 2016, ARL and its collaborators published additional research, "Cockroach-inspired winged robot reveals principles of ground-based dynamic self-righting", demonstrating a bio-inspired design. Researchers showed that robots can use insect body structures to achieve self-righting, as demonstrated in the rounded shell and mobile wings of the robot prototype.

== American Robot Wars: 1994–1997 ==
Biohazard was the first robot to self-right in combat, against Vlad the Impaler in the 1996 tournament, however since the match had ended it made no difference to who actually won. Terminal Frenzy had attempted to right itself when it earlier came up against Biohazard, but failed to do so. The next year Vlad the Impaler fought Biohazard again, and the former used its special pneumatic lifting arm to self-right numerous times, yet it still lost the judge's decision.

== UK Robot Wars Series 2-3 ==
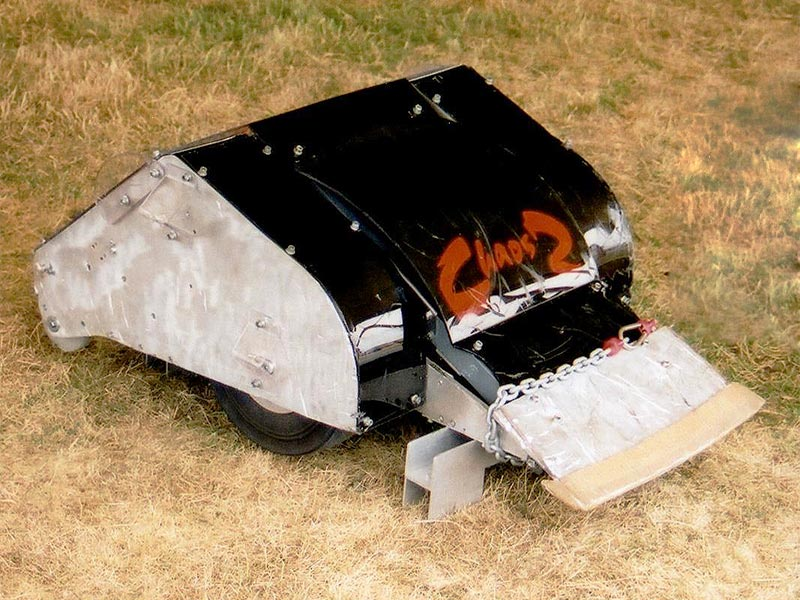
Chaos 2

The first attempted self-right in the UK Robot Wars was by a robot called Chaos, during its Series 2 heat final. However, it was unable to do so. Later in the series, Cassius successfully righted itself with its pneumatic flipping arm, after Sir Killalot had flipped it over with his drill during the semi-final pinball trial. Cassius was flipped again in the Grand Final, but it self-righted and flipped Roadblock to win the eliminator. In Series 3, Chaos' successor Chaos 2 used its innovative rear-hinged flipper panel to catapult itself through the air and then land on its wheels, a technique that later became standard.

== Weapon srimechs ==
The majority of flippers can double as srimechs. However, most flippers are powered by CO_{2} and therefore have limited uses. Some axes can also be used as srimechs; the first robot to successfully use an axe to self-right was Iron Awe in Robot Wars Series 4.

=== Robot Wars robots with notable weapon srimechs ===
Robot's name	Competing series	Weapon	Notes
Cassius	Series 2–3	Flipper	First robot to successfully self-right in UK Robot Wars
Chaos 2	Series 3–6, Extreme 1–2	Flipper	First rear-hinged flipper to catapult the robot back onto its wheels
Iron Awe	Series 4	Axe	First robot to successfully self-right with an axe
Lightning	Series 7, Extreme 2	Flipper	First robot to self-right with a side-hinged flipper

== Other methods of self-righting ==
Some robots use weapons that cannot assist in self-righting, requiring the addition of a dedicated self-righting mechanism. These designs vary in complexity and effectiveness, such as the side wings on Razer, the motorised bar on Hypno-Disc, or the lifting top lid of Panic Attack. While these systems allow the primary weapon to remain specialised for attack, they consume a portion of the robot's strictly limited weight budget, often forcing a compromise in armour thickness or internal components.

=== Body shape ===
A rarer and more difficult type of srimech was to design the robot's body in such a way that it could roll back onto its wheels when flipped. Sometimes known as a "rollover" design, robots with this ability included Mega Morg. While a fairly ingenious solution, that did not require any additional power or mechanics, there were still flaws. It was extremely difficult to get the design perfect, and if flipped without enough momentum or flipped from the front or back, the robot would be left stranded. Mega Morg's predecessor, The Morgue, was also defeated in Series 4 by Firestorm when it was flipped against the arena wall, preventing it from rolling over.

Some robots were not true rollover designs, but had other design elements intended to aid them in self-righting. Examples include the rounded Lexan panels on the rear of Behemoth, without which it would have stranded itself on its back when self-righting, and Spikasaurus' roll-bars. These were often effective but, like active srimechs, they were vulnerable to damage.

== See also ==
- Gömböc
