= Storm 2 =

Robot from the British Robot Wars game show

Storm 2 (commonly known as Storm II) is a robot that competed in the British television game show Robot Wars. It was a small invertible box-shaped robot with a wedge on the front. The robot was originally built with no weapons but the team was asked to add an active weapon in order to take part in the seventh series, so the team came up with a built-in lifting arm, very similar to the American robot BioHazard. However, it was not the weapon but the immense speed and power of the robot that did the most damage to its opponents, managing to throw The Steel Avenger out of the Arena in its Series 7 heat final. The robot competed in the seventh series of Robot Wars, winning The Third World Championship at the end of the series, having won the 16th seed into the competition by being victorious in the New Blood Championship of Extreme 2.

Storm 2 was created by Ed Hoppitt. Tim Bence and Andrew Rayner joined him. Hoppitt and Bence would alternate driving during the wars. Not long after the filming of New Blood, Andrew Rayner got married, moved house, and began a family, so Bence's fiance, Meral Kolac, filled his place on the team.

Storm 2 was somewhat notable in the original run because it was the most prominent robot never to lose a battle through KO, only losing one battle on a controversial judge's decision. The said decision was the grand final of Series 7, losing the title to Typhoon 2. However, it lost on knockout to Apollo (who went on to win the series) in the heat final of the 2016 series after being thrown out of the arena, having lost to the same bot on judges decision in the group stages - in both fixtures, Apollo flipped over at least one house robot. Storm 2 was eligible to be named as a wildcard but was not chosen.

Like many other robots, Storm 2 also competed in Techno Games as Ickle Toaster in the Football and Sumo events. The original Storm was never seen in Robot Wars but competed in various robot combat events across the UK and the Dutch Robot Games.

When it was involved on the 2016 series of Robot Wars, the robot cost £20,000 and used Telemetry systems, thermistors, bespoke PMDC motors, and dry ice systems to prevent overheating.

== Extreme Series 2 ==
=== New Blood competition ===
Heats	Opponent(s)	Result
Round 1	Revolution 2 & Direct Action	Qualified (with Revolution 2)
Round 2	Chopper	Won
Final	ICU	Won
Grand Final
Eliminator	Thor	Won on judges' decision
Grand Final	Mute	Won on judges' decision

== Series 7 ==
Heats
Round	Opponent(s)	Result
Round 1	Supernova, Mayhem, Rhino	Qualified (with Rhino)
Round 2	Trax	Won
Round 3	The Steel Avenger	Won
Semi-Finals
Round 4	The Grimreaper	Won on judges' decision
Round 5	Firestorm V	Won
Grand Final
Round 6	Tornado	Won on judges' decision
Round 7	Typhoon 2	Lost on a judges' decision

=== The Third World Championship ===
Round	Opponent(s)	Result
Heat	Tornado (UK), Ansgar 3 (Germany)	Won
Semi-Final	Tough as Nails (Netherlands)	Won
Grand Final	Supernova (Sri Lanka)	Won to become World Champion

=== 2016 Series ===
Heats		
Round 1	Opponent(s)	Result
Round 1	Eruption, Sabre Tooth and Terror Turtle	Qualified (with Eruption)
Group Phase		
Group Phase, Battle 1	Eruption	Won on judges' vote (2 points)
Group Phase, Battle 2	Apollo	Lost on judges' vote (0 points)
Group Phase, Battle 3	PP3D	Won on knockout (3 points)
Heat Final		
Final	Apollo	Lost

== Series record ==
- Series 1-6: Did not enter
- Series 7: Second place

== Robot honours ==
Extreme Series 2

- New Blood Champion

Series 7

- Grand-final-Second place

Series 7

- Third Robot Wars World Champion

Preceded by Razer	UK Robot Wars; World Champion (Championship 3)	None (series cancelled)
