= Combat robot =

Combat robot may refer to:

- Combat robot (sports), a machine built by hobbyists to compete in competition events
- Military robot, a robotic device designed for military applications
- Lethal autonomous weapon, a fully-autonomous form of military robot
