= Razer (robot) =

Combat robot from Robot Wars

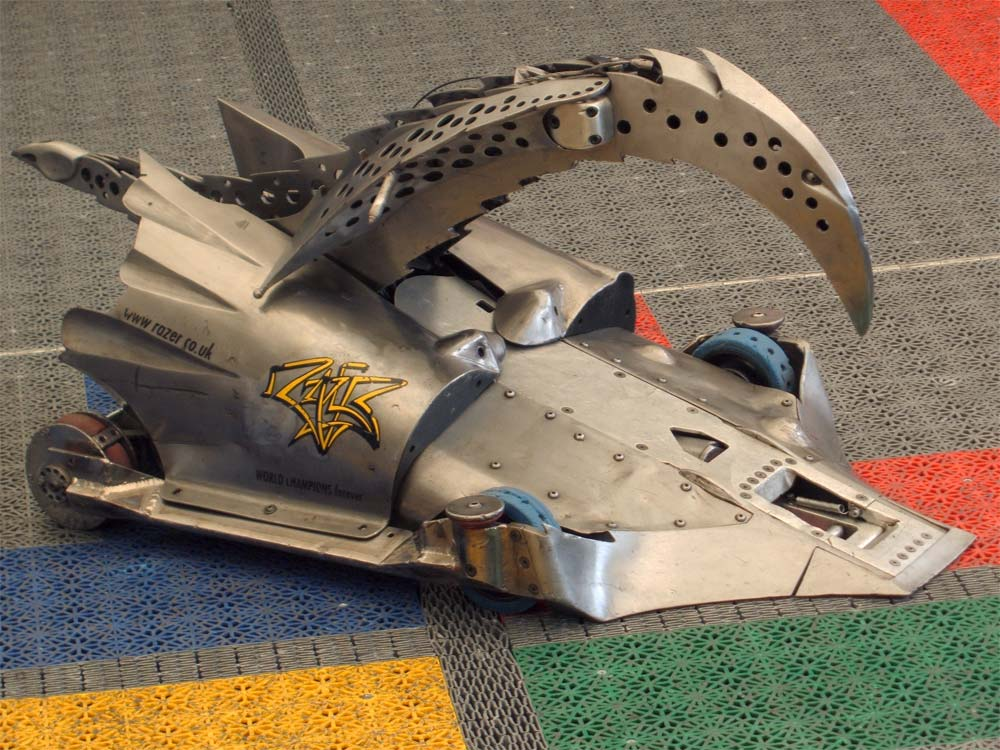
- Razer as it appeared in series 6 of Robot Wars, featuring a piercing arm and wedge

Statistics
- Height: 0.41 m (1.3 ft)
- Width: 0.60 m (2.0 ft)
- Depth: 1.14 m (3.7 ft)
- Weight: 92 kg (203 lb)
- Weight class: Heavyweight
- Primary weapon: Piercing arm
- Maximum speed: 11 mph (18 km/h)
- Turning circle: 0 m (0 ft)
- Ground clearance: 0 mm (0 in)
- Power source: 2 × 12V batteries

Team
- Team members: Ian Lewis; Simon Scott; Vincent Blood; Gillian Lewis; Darcie Lewis
- Location: Bournemouth
- Country of origin: United Kingdom

Record
- Total fights: 47
- Wins: 40
- Losses: 6
- Concessions: 1
- Statistics from Razer's television appearances (as of 24 July 2016)

Razer is a combat robot that competes on the British television series Robot Wars. It was constructed by Simon Scott and Ian Lewis from Bournemouth; the team later expanded to include webmaster Vincent Blood. Razer was designed and constructed in 1998 to participate in the second series of Robot Wars, but subsequent modifications and improvements enabled it to remain competitive until its retirement after the second series of Robot Wars Extreme. Despite gaining a reputation for being unreliable, it was champion of the fifth series of Robot Wars, runner-up in the sixth, and won the first two Robot Wars World Championships.

Razer's weapon is a piercing arm which exerts approximately three tonnes of pressure per square inch (465 kg/cm^{2}, 45.6 MPa) at its tip. The arm was designed to pierce opponents' armour plating and break their internal components, rendering them impaired or immobile. This weapon was inspired by the principle of the fly press—a piece of machinery used to bend and pierce metal—and maximises damage through the use of hydraulics. The arm is also an integral element of Razer's winged self-righting mechanism, which rolls the robot back onto its wheels if inverted. In later series of Robot Wars, an interchangeable hook was attached to the arm to lift robots immune from being pierced. The popularity of crushing and piercing weaponry in robot combat events is attributed to Razer, which inspired many imitations.

With a record of 40 wins and 6 losses (one through concession) in the UK Robot Wars series, Razer is recognised as one of the most successful competitors in the programme's history. It was featured on Robot Wars merchandise including a DVD and video games, and had a pull-back toy created in its image—one of which was later modified by Ian Lewis to function as a fully radio controllable miniature version of the team's original heavyweight machine. Razer also competed in the American television series BattleBots, winning three of its five head-to-head battles and the 1999 Gigabot Rumble. The team behind Razer later constructed a new combatant called Warhead specifically for this competition. After retirement, Razer appears in non-combat demonstrations as part of Robo Challenge educational displays and events. It returned to active combat in the 2016 revival of Robot Wars but lost in the first round.

== Construction ==
=== Origins ===
Razer was designed and built by Ian Lewis and Simon Scott who, after watching the first series of Robot Wars, agreed that combat robots had potential to be considerably more destructive than the pioneering machines on display. Their choice of weapon was a piercing arm attached to a hydraulic ram and powered by a pump, itself powered by a motorcycle starter motor. This was based on the principle of the fly press, a piece of machinery used to bend and pierce metal through progressive force.

Razer's hydraulic system pumped pressurised liquid, as opposed to pneumatics where a force is generated by the controlled release of a pressurised gas. Razer's arm was often said to exert nine tonnes of force; however, it was the hydraulic ram which produced up to nine tonnes of pressure per square inch (1,395 kg/cm^{2}, 137 MPa) at its output, and this was geared down to three tonnes per square inch (465 kg/cm^{2}, 45.6 MPa) at the tip of the arm.

=== Modifications ===
The series two version of Razer featured its trademark arm but lacked a self-righting mechanism.

This iteration of Razer competed in the second series of Robot Wars, successfully passing the Gauntlet and Trials stages of its heat before being defeated in battle by a robot called Inquisitor. The cause of Razer's immobilisation in this fight was the shearing of nylon cush drives—cushioning blocks designed to prevent stress fractures—in the machine's drive wheels; these were replaced with more robust metal ones for future competitions. As the Robot Wars television series evolved and grew, Razer's design was revised and refined to counter weaknesses and take advantage of rule changes; by series four, Lewis estimated that Razer had taken 1,500 hours to build, at a cost of £1,600.

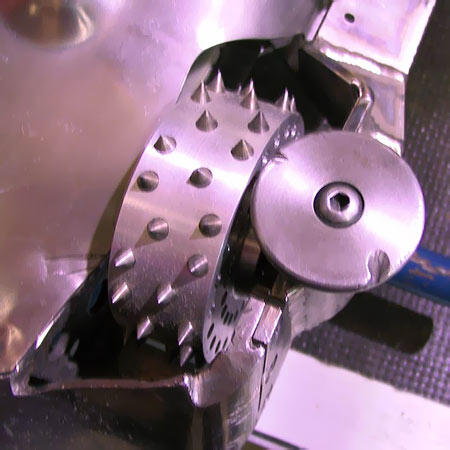
Razer's rubber front wheels were replaced with spiked metal ones for the second series of Robot Wars Extreme.

Razer's four-wheeled drive train used a skid-steering arrangement, whereby the wheels on one side of the robot rotated faster than those on the other to turn the machine. Also, the weight of the robot was biased towards the rear so that its weapon stayed facing its opponent as Razer turned. However, the solid rubber rear wheels used in series two provided too much traction and were reluctant to 'swing' the machine. For the third series, Razer used custom-made aluminium drive wheels which incorporated rollers, reducing the amount of force required for simultaneous forward and sideways movement. These wheels were later upgraded with a stronger titanium construction, whilst the level of oversteer in the drive system was reduced through the implementation of an electronic gyroscope. For the series Robot Wars Extreme II, Razer's rubber front wheels were replaced with metal ones bearing small spiked protrusions.

Whereas competitors in the first series of Robot Wars had largely featured passive weapons, the second series saw a greater number of robots—including the series champion, Panic Attack—using lifting and flipping weapons designed to overturn an opponent. Lewis and Scott noted that when Razer was overturned with its piercing arm fully upright, the robot was more than halfway towards naturally rolling back onto its wheels. Therefore, rather than equipping Razer with a powered mechanism for righting itself when inverted, two wings were attached to the arm. Tensioned via cables, the wings opened when the arm was fully raised, levering Razer back onto its wheels. The unique design provided Razer with a "victory salute"—raising its claw and wings whilst standing on its tail—but had the downside of putting the machine over the weight limit of 79.4 kilograms (175 lb). To redress the balance, approximately 450 holes were drilled in the robot's metalwork.

From series five of Robot Wars onwards, the weight limit for heavyweight competitors was increased to 100 kilograms (220 lb). This allowed for improvements to the chassis and bodywork of Razer including new titanium outriggers, and 2.5-millimetre (0.098 in) thick armour panels versus 1-millimetre (0.039 in) before. The most noticeable alteration to this version of Razer was a redesigned front scoop. This enclosed the front wheels to reduce side-on impact damage, and greatly decreased the robot's ground clearance to reduce its vulnerability to being flipped, whilst also making it easier to get underneath opponents to crush them. This iteration of Razer won the first Robot Wars Extreme All-Stars championship and series five of Robot Wars, alongside mounting a successful defence of its World Champion title. By the time of Razer's Robot Wars Extreme II appearances, the machine weighed 92 kilograms (203 lb), was 1.14 metres (3.7 ft) long, and reached a top speed of 11 miles per hour (18 km/h).

== Combat history ==
=== Series 2–4 and BattleBots ===
Razer made its debut in the fourth heat of series two of Robot Wars, which was viewed by almost six million people on BBC Two. It had been finished late the night before the recording. Radio interference caused Razer to be hard to control in the Gauntlet stage of the competition, but it successfully navigated the obstacle course and progressed to the Trial. This phase was a robotic football match, wherein Razer scored the first goal to reach the heat semi-final. Its opponent for this one-on-one battle was Inquisitor, a box-shaped robot equipped with a rotating flail. Whilst Razer made the stronger start, crumpling Inquisitor's flail support, the cush drives in its motors sheared after an impact on the arena floor. This rendered Razer immobile and ended a promising run. Despite its relatively early exit from the competition, Razer won the Best Design award for series two. After series two, Vincent Blood joined the Razer team after being taken up on his offer to create a basic website for Razer.

Before series three of Robot Wars, Razer was entered into the American robot combat programme BattleBots in Los Angeles after the team won an international scholarship along with fellow British robots, Killerhurtz and Mortis. Razer's first battle was against Voltarc. It flipped Razer, but Lewis self-righted and Scott pierced Voltarc's armour. Razer was given the victory on a crowd's vote. Its next fight was against Agrippa, which Razer defeated by crushing through its opponent's electrical system. Razer's next adversary, Tazbot, beat it after flipping it onto the arena saws which severed a cable and left Razer unable to self-right. Razer dropped into the "best of the rest" competition. Therein it faced Kill-O-Amp which was defeated after Razer pulled a wheel off before crushing its opponent's battery. It then faced Rhino in the next round, losing after Rhino's spike pierced Razer's armour, breaking the starter solenoid and knocking the radio switch into the off position. This also sent Razer into an uncontrolled spin, requiring Lewis to enter the arena to manually power Razer down. Finally, Razer competed in the 13 robot Gigabot Rumble. After the time limit expired, five robots including Razer were still mobile and the result went to an audience vote. After the crowd voted in their favour, Razer became the 1999 Gigabot Rumble Champion.

From series three of Robot Wars, the Gauntlet and Trial stages of each heat were dropped, with the whole of the main competition formed around direct combat. Razer's first battle of the series was against Backstabber. Scott lowered Razer's arm into an extrusion on Backstabber, and Lewis pushed their opponent into the 'pit', an open hole in the arena floor. In the second round, despite causing damage to Aggrobot, Razer lost due to a mechanical failure: the valve which controls the direction of hydraulic fluid in the arm jammed, causing Razer's arm to raise to its full height and refuse to lower. With its rear wheels off the ground, Razer was weaponless and immobile, and eliminated early from the main competition once more. Outside of the main UK championship, Razer won the concurrent Pinball Warrior Tournament side event and retained the Best Design award.

Immediately after filming series three, Razer participated in the International Championship. Following forfeiture by Prometheus, its scheduled first opponent, Razer beat the Dutch representative Techno-Lease and Irish entrant Diotoir to win the tournament. Razer also fought in the direct-to-video First World Championship, representing England. Dominant victories over the Scottish robot All Torque and fellow English entrants Chaos 2 and 101 put Razer into the Final against compatriots Behemoth. In a very closely fought contest that was not without moments of controversy, Razer won the fight on a split judges decision, the tournament and its associated title.

In the first round of its series four heat, Razer progressed alongside Robochicken from a three-way battle in which Velocirippa was eliminated. In its next battle against Milly-Ann Bug, Razer methodically removed all of its opponent's wheels, rendering Milly-Ann Bug unable to move. In a post-battle interview with host Craig Charles, Blood likened this attack to "pulling the legs off a spider". Early on in its heat final against Pussycat, Razer malfunctioned. Stuck in forward drive, it careered into the arena side wall with the rear wheels spinning but unable to steer. Pussycat severely damaged the back end and wheels of Razer, until Dead Metal of the house robots pitted the machine. Although Scott and Blood were gracious in defeat, Lewis turned his back on the fight, left the control booth immediately afterwards, and refused to be interviewed by Craig Charles. Lewis accused the Pussycat team of breaking a gentlemen's agreement that both teams would not seriously damage the other's machine. However, seeing that Razer's wheels were still spinning, Team Pussycat were unaware that Razer was in fact immobilised. Razer also took part in the Pinball Warrior and Sumo Basho side tournaments of series four; its performances were underwhelming in both events, scoring 95 points in the former having abandoned the run partway through to attack Sir Killalot, and lasting less than five seconds in the latter.

=== Southern Annihilator – Series 5 ===
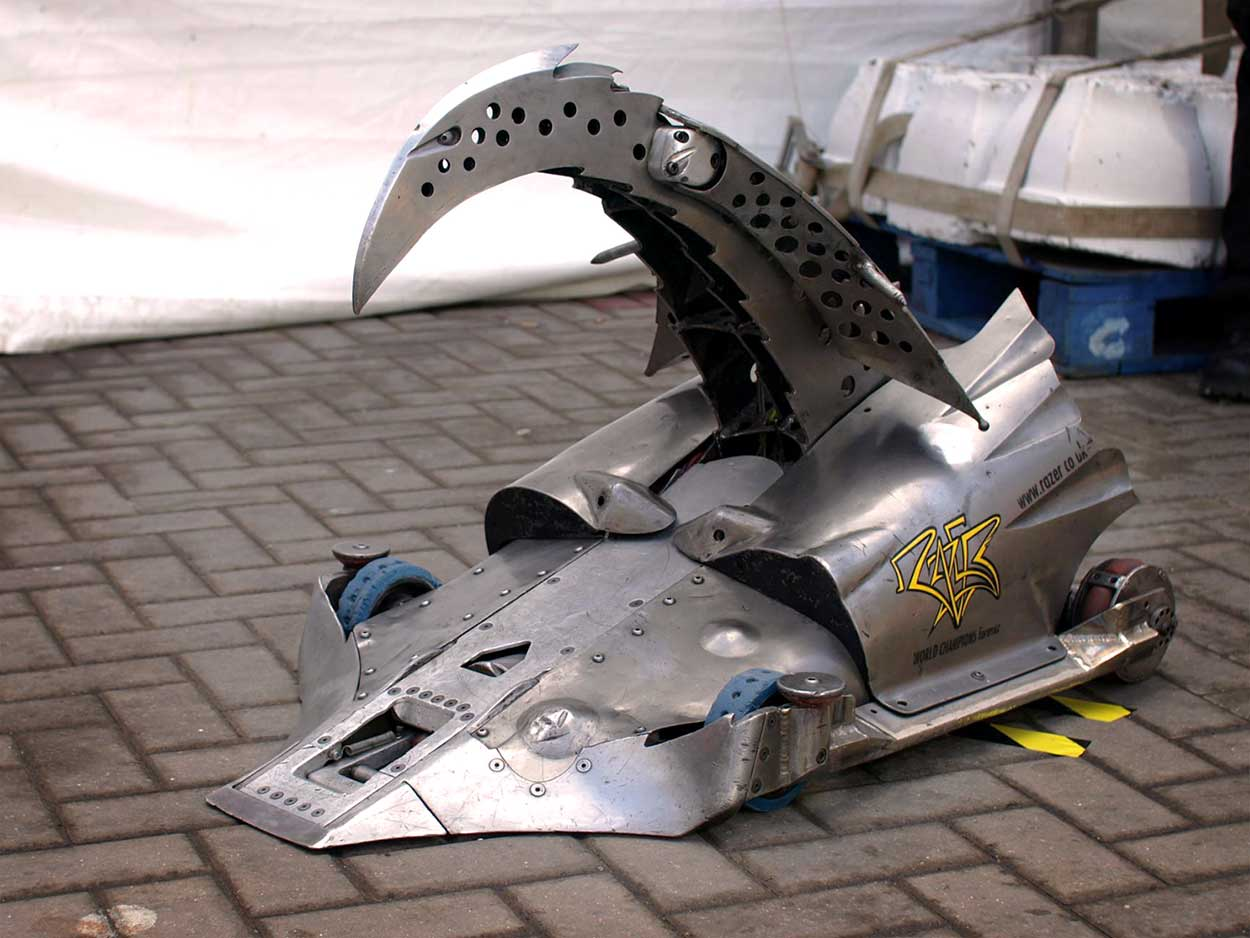
Over 450 holes drilled into Razer's bodywork and wheels kept the machine within tournament weight limits.

Razer's next appearance came in a Robot Wars Christmas special called the Southern Annihilator. Six robots fought at the same time until one was eliminated, either through immobilisation or judges' decision. The remaining five robots then fought again, eliminating another, and so on until one robot remained and was declared the winner. Razer outlasted Vercingetorix, Spawn of Scutter, Behemoth and Attila the Drum to set up a final against Onslaught. An attack by Razer's arm on one of Onslaught's rear wheels saw its adversary shed a tyre, lose grip, and drive into an area patrolled by Matilda. The house robot flipped Onslaught onto its side, rendering it immobile. Assured of victory, Razer proceeded to attack Matilda, causing horrific damage to Matilda's bodywork and rear shell, and then pushed her over a flame pit to set her on fire.

It next took part in the All-Stars tournament of Robot Wars Extreme, beating Gemini, Behemoth and Firestorm 3 to establish a grand final against Tornado. In their first competitive encounter, Razer repeatedly pierced Tornado's low, flat body, eventually breaking their drive chain. Tornado was immobilised, and Razer won a second consecutive trophy. Its only other battle in Extreme was a grudge match with Pussycat, in response to the accusation that the Pussycat team had broken an agreement with the Razer team during their series four heat. Razer punctured Pussycat's body and lifted it with the arm but Pussycat fell and escaped. In doing so, Pussycat impacted the steel guard around Razer's front right wheel and jammed the metal into the wheel itself, rendering Razer completely unable to move and it was subsequently counted out. Ian Lewis of Team Razer competed in a seven-way melee featuring antweight robots—miniature machines that weighed less than 150 grams (5.3 oz) and fitted into a four-inch (10.16 cm) cube. Lewis's robot for this battle was Razzler, a modified Razer toy.

Razer's next tournament was the Second World Championship. Its title defence began with qualification from a melee against Diotoir, Flensburger Power and The Revolutionist. It then beat fellow English representative Tornado in the semi-final before facing walking robot DrillZilla in the final. Being classed as a walking robot, DrillZilla could ignore the normal weight limit and thus had 10 millimetres (0.39 in) thick armour; knowing that they would be unable to pierce this, Razer concentrated on inflicting cosmetic damage to its opponent's rubber feet. This proved enough to secure victory on a judges' decision, enabling Razer to retain its World Champion title.

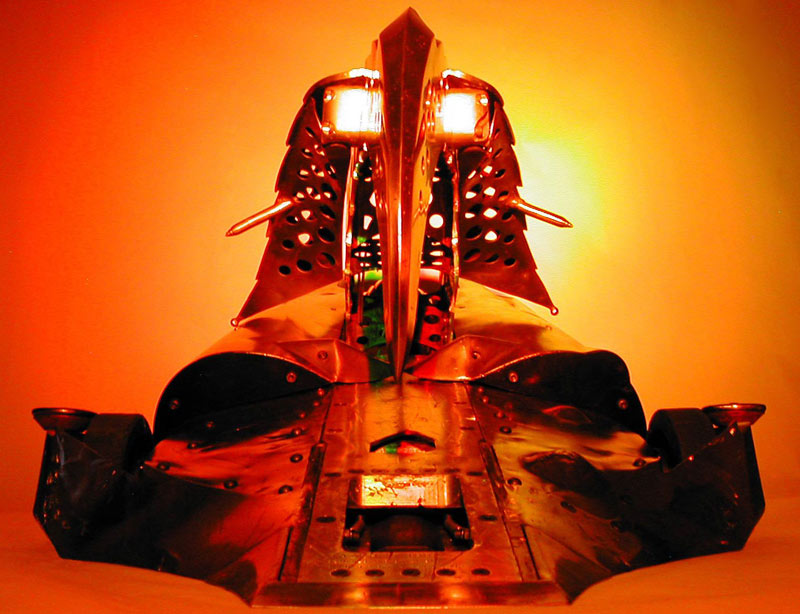
Razer's new front wedge was a key factor in its winning Robot Wars series five.

On a 12-battle victory streak, (Note: Razer's grudge match with Pussycat was filmed after series five but broadcast before as part of Robot Wars Extreme.) Razer fought in the eleventh heat of the fifth series of Robot Wars. Therein, it defeated Big Nipper, Widow's Revenge—a machine reportedly constructed by the Razer team's wives—and Rick to reach its first series semi-final. Their next opponent was Spawn Again, which was armed with a pneumatic flipper. Equipped with a new lower front wedge, Razer was able to get underneath Spawn Again and crush it until it broke down. In the quarter finals, Razer faced S3, a cylindrical robot with a vertical spinning blade. Razer's arm sliced into S3's weapon controls, stopping the disc, which allowed Razer to dominate the fight and win on a judges' decision.

Team Razer faced Firestorm 3 in their first battle of the series grand final, in a rematch from the All-Stars semi-final from earlier that year. Whilst victory in the earlier battle had been relatively straightforward, Firestorm 3 had increased the thickness of its armour for this battle to make it harder for Razer to inflict major damage. This tactic almost worked: Razer was unable to completely immobilise their opponent, and Firestorm 3 was extremely aggressive from the outset, and at one point pushed Razer 'across the pit' near the end of the battle. However, the fight ended in a very close judges' decision—in Razer's favour. Victory handed Razer a place in the series five grand final against Bigger Brother, rebuilt after being heavily damaged by Hypno-Disc in its previous battle. Razer gripped Bigger Brother early in the battle, causing damage to its opponent's drive chain from which Bigger Brother never recovered. The final ended in a stalemate and went to the judges; their decision came back in favour of Razer. Along with the UK Championship, Razer also took home a third Best Design award.

=== Series 6 ===
Coming into series six as reigning champion, Razer started its title defence by qualifying in a four-way melee. It then defeated the pyramid-shaped robot Cyrax on a judges' decision to set up a heat final against Raging Reality. It pushed its opponent towards Matilda's flywheel, which ripped off an entire side panel and caused Raging Reality to break down. This put Razer in the semi-finals for a second consecutive series. Razer damaged its opponent Wild Thing's exposed drive wheels, hampering its movement, then grasped it with the arm and dropped Wild Thing into the pit. Razer next fought Dantomkia, which was armed with a pneumatic flipping arm. Although Razer was the early aggressor, Dantomkia retaliated by pushing Razer into the arena wall. The rest of the battle was similar, with Razer's more potent attacks countered by Dantomkia's pushing power. Based on the damage inflicted, the judges decided that Razer should move on to a second series final.

In the grand final, Razer faced axe-wielding robot Terrorhurtz, the only unseeded robot to reach the grand final that year. Razer skilfully avoided the axe and lowered its arm into Terrorhurtz's polycarbonate armour panels. Terrorhurtz lined up for another strike, but Razer slid its wedge under Terrorhurtz's chassis, burying its arm in its opponent, carried Terrorhurtz to the pit release button, and dropped it into the pit. Only Tornado stood between Razer and a successful title defence. However, after having suffered two sound defeats by Razer, the developers of Tornado had added a metal frame with a large horizontal rotating blade. Having declared the modification to the judges prior to the competition, it controversially qualified as an "interchangeable weapon", and the added advantage of this setup was that the size of the framework needed to support the large spinning blade prevented Razer's claw from reaching Tornado's chassis. Team Razer responded by attaching a metal lifting hook to the front of their robot's crushing arm just moments before the fight. Although the team knew this additional weapon would still not allow them to pierce Tornado's main body, they hoped that it could lift it into the air by the framework. In the battle, Tornado's superior pushing power was used to great effect early on, as it slammed Razer into the arena wall and the house robots, but it suffered severe damage to its external frame in the process, resulting in the rotating blade severing its own drive belt. Despite suffering a few dents from its encounter with the arena walls and one huge blow from Shunt's axe, Razer turned the tables in the fight's last moments. Razer lifted Tornado up using its new hook and carried it over to the pit, but the size of the additional framework prevented Tornado from falling in, the first example of what commentator Jonathan Pearce called an 'anti-pit device' or 'APD'. The fight was stopped about 15 seconds later, but the Razer team argued that Tornado was suspended above the pit and therefore immobilised. After a 45-minute discussion, during which the judges inspected each of the robots for damage and took the final stages of the fight into account, the judges narrowly and controversially ruled in favour of Tornado becoming the new UK champion.

=== Extreme II ===
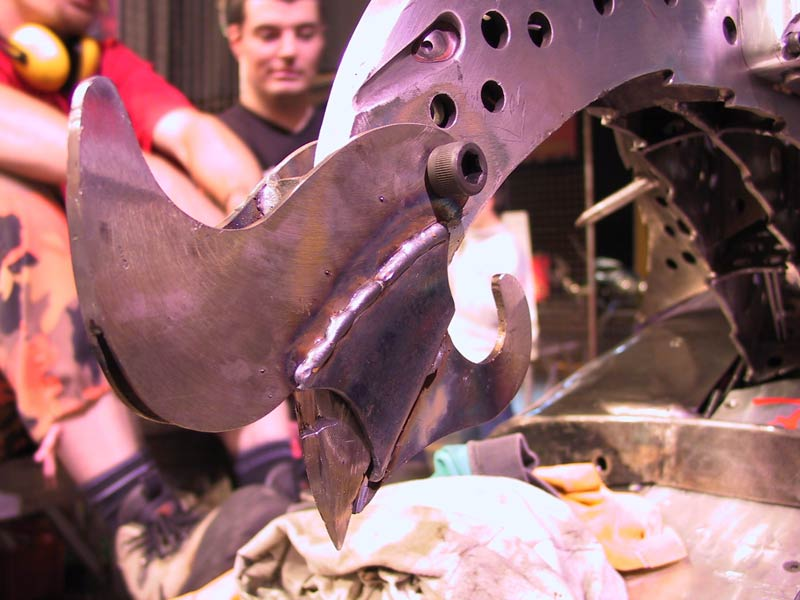
Razer's hook attachment was enlarged and strengthened for Robot Wars Extreme II.

Although it had lost its UK title, Razer still reigned as champion of the Extreme All-Stars tournament. Its first battle to defend this title was against twice UK champion Chaos 2 and dual-spinner 13 Black. Razer and 13 Black joined forces to eliminate Chaos 2, in what was its last ever fight on Robot Wars. Razer's next battle against Spawn Again was a rematch from the series five semi-finals. Razer was again the aggressor: it repeatedly punctured Spawn Again's body panels, prompting its constructors to seek safety by driving themselves into the pit. Razer's next battle was one-on-one versus 13 Black. Following an impact with the arena wall, 13 Black stopped spinning for long enough that Razer could lift it with the arm and lower it into the pit. In the All-Stars grand final, Razer faced Firestorm 4. Razer manoeuvred its wedge underneath Firestorm 4, lowered the arm and immobilised its opponent. Razer was All-Stars champion for a second time running.

The European Championship was Razer's next—and final—televised tournament, for which it qualified as reigning World Champion. It defeated Dutch champions Pulveriser to set up a semi-final against Tornado. Razer's adversaries once again attached the anti-crusher frame that had proven so effective in their previous meeting in the series six grand final, but the Razer team had clearly prepared for this, and installed a revised, stronger version of the lifting hook. Although Tornado was the early aggressor, Razer's new hook proved far more effective, hoisting Tornado into the air and dragged it towards the pit. However, once again, the size of Tornado's framework made it virtually impossible for Razer to drop it in. Indeed, commentator Jonathan Pearce wondered aloud during live commentary whether the judges, following the conclusion of the fight, would take a look at Tornado's external 'rigging' for future iterations of Robot Wars and discuss whether it should be allowed. With Razer unable to drop Tornado in the pit, time expired and the result went to a judges' decision, who awarded victory to Razer for being in control of the fight throughout. However, in a split decision, the Razer team decided this was an unfair ruling, given that the judges had not realised that the strain of lifting Tornado in the second half of the battle had caused Razer's drive motors to burn out, technically rendering it immobile for more than 30 seconds. They therefore graciously conceded the match to Tornado, who went on to beat Philliper 2 in the final to claim the European title.

== Retirement and Robot Wars reboot ==
After five years of appearing on BBC channels, the seventh regular series of Robot Wars was broadcast by Five. Razer did not participate and, following the cancellation of the series, was retired from combat. The team then started to hire apprentices to help them in independent robotics demonstrations. Razer now appears in non-combat demonstrations at displays and events organised by Robo Challenge, a robotics demonstration company.

Razer returned to action for the 2016 revival of Robot Wars, but was knocked out in the first round after being dragged into the pit by Kill-E Crank-E while attempting to push it in, immobilising both. After this, Razer was retired from combat permanently.

== Impact ==
Team Razer was acknowledged for having devised and popularised the crushing and piercing arm weapon. Razer's success spawned a number of imitations: Suicidal Tendencies, Ming 3 and Tiberius are amongst the other heavyweight robots to have adopted such a weapon, whilst the featherweight robot Venom is a scaled-down replica of Razer. In 2001, Razer appeared in cartoon form on the front cover of the seventeenth issue of Robot Wars Magazine. It was also included in the Robot Wars video games. The version of Razer which competed in the fourth series of Robot Wars was used as the model for a pull-back toy powered by friction motors. This was sold alongside a model stunt ramp and barrels. A small metal toy based on Razer was available as part of the Robot Wars minibots range and, alongside Chaos 2 and Hypno-Disc, Razer was one of three competitor robots chosen to appear on a personalised DVD as part of the Robot Wars Ultimate Warrior Collection series.

Awards and achievements
| Preceded by Plunderbird 1 | Robot Wars Best Design award Series 2–3 | Succeeded by Gemini |
| New championship | Battlebots Gigabot Rumble Champion; Long Beach 1999 | Succeeded by BioHazard |
| New championship | Robot Wars Pinball Warrior Champion; Series 3 | Succeeded by Gemini |
| New championship | Robot Wars International Champion; 1st Championship | Succeeded by Tornado |
| Preceded by Spikasaurus | Robot Wars Annihilator; Series 4 | Succeeded by Pussycat |
| New championship | Robot Wars All-Stars Champion; Extreme – Extreme II | Succeeded by Pussycat |
| New championship | Robot Wars World Champion; 1st Championship – 2nd Championship | Succeeded by Storm 2 |
| Preceded by Chaos 2 | Robot Wars UK Champion; Series 5 | Succeeded by Tornado |
| Preceded by Gemini | Robot Wars Best Design Award; Series 5 | Succeeded by 259 |
