= Robot combat =

Type of robot competition

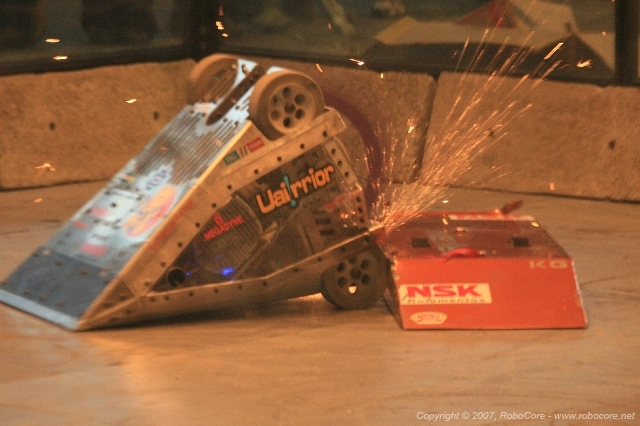
Two robots in combat at a Brazilian RoboCore event in 2007

Robot combat is a type of robot competition in which machines fight each other using various methods to disable, defeat, or outscore opponents. The machines have historically been remote-controlled vehicles; some newer completions have introduced autonomous and humanoid robots, though remote-controlled machines remain the overwhelmingly more popular choice in most competitions.

Robot combat competitions have been made into television series, including Robot Wars in the United Kingdom and BattleBots in the United States. These shows were originally broadcast in the late 1990s to early 2000s and experienced revivals in the mid-2010s. As well as televised competitions, smaller robot combat events are staged for live audiences such as those organized by the Robot Fighting League.

Robot builders are generally hobbyists and the complexity and cost of their machines can vary substantially. Robot combat uses weight classes, with the heaviest robots able to exert more power and destructive capabilities. The rules of competitions are designed for the safety of the builders, operators, and spectators while also providing an entertaining spectacle. Robot combat arenas are generally surrounded by a bulletproof screen.

Competitor robots come in a variety of designs, with different strategies for winning fights. Robot designs typically incorporate weapons for attacking opponents, such as axes, hammers, flippers, and spinning devices. Rules almost always prohibit gun-like weapons as well as other strategies not conducive to the safety and enjoyment of participants and spectators.

== History ==
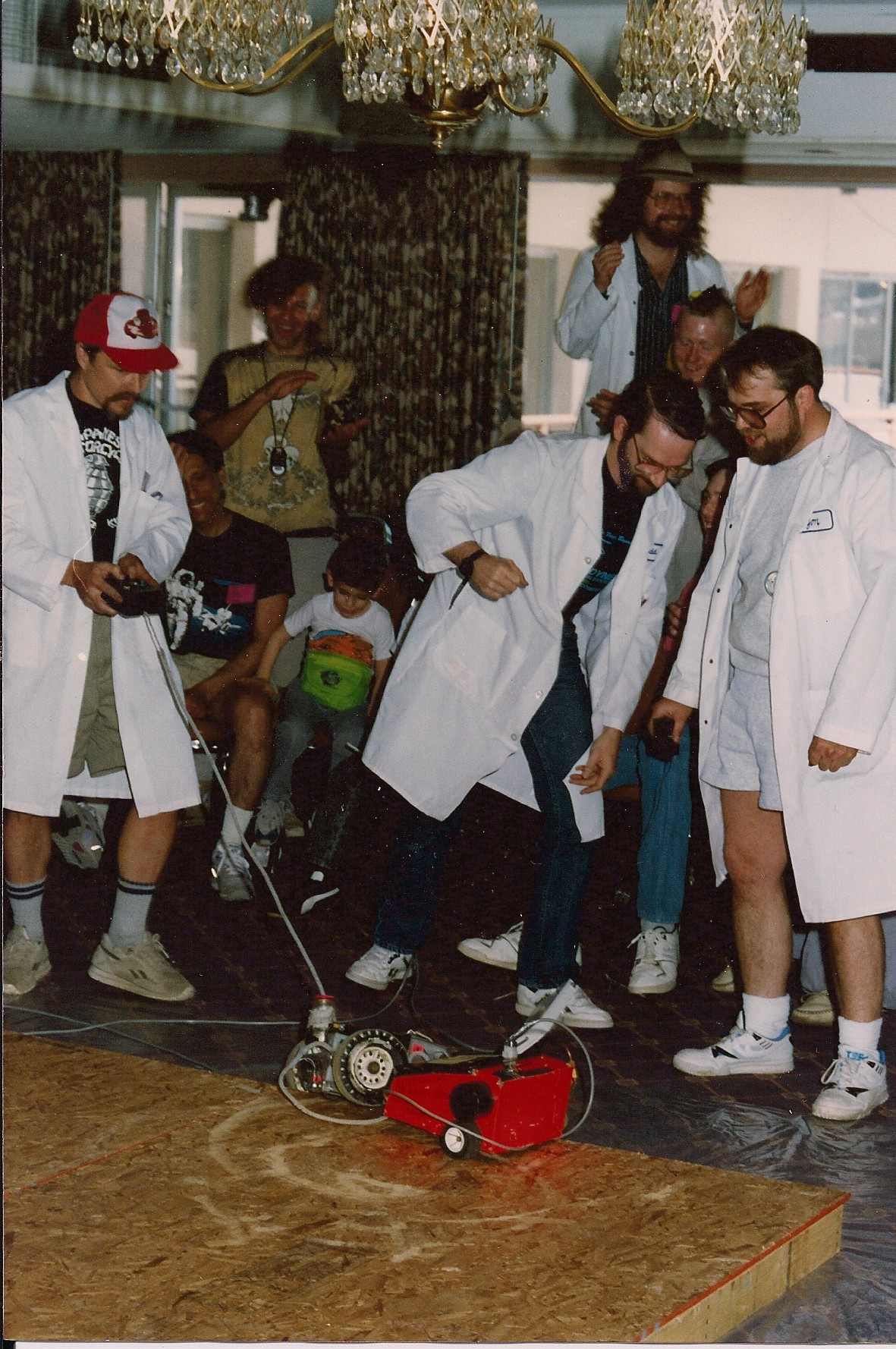
Critter Crunch in 1991, at the moment when "Agent Orange" beat Bill Lewellyn's critter to win the event

Among the oldest robotic combat competitions extant in the United States are the "Critter Crunch" (founded about 1987) in Denver and "Robot Battles" (founded in 1991) based in the southeastern United States. Both events are run by members of the "Denver Mad Scientists Society".

- 1987 – The "Denver Mad Scientists Society" organized the first Critter Crunch competition at Denver's MileHiCon science-fiction convention.
- 1990 – The First Robot Olympics took place in Glasgow, Scotland organized by the Turing Institute and marked a 'peacetime' recreational contest between robots from multiple countries.
- 1991 – Kelly Lockhart organized the first "Robot Battles" competition at Atlanta's DragonCon science-fiction convention.
- 1994 – Marc Thorpe organized the first Robot Wars competition in San Francisco. Four annual competitions were held from 1994 to 1997.
- 1997 – Rights to the Robot Wars name are transferred to British TV production company Mentorn, who produce the Robot Wars television series. Series 1 and 2 feature competitive games and obstacle courses as well as simple combat. In Series 3, the main competition switches to entirely combat. In the United Kingdom, Robot Wars aired 157 episodes across nine series (seven main tournament series and two "Extreme" side-competition series) from 1998 to 2003. Three spin-off series were produced for the United States (2001–2002), two for the Netherlands (2001–2003), and one for Germany (2002).
- 1999 – Former Robot Wars competitors in the United States organize a new competition, named BattleBots. The first tournament was shown as a webcast, with the second tournament shown as a cable 'Pay-per-view' event.
- 2000 – BattleBots is picked up as a weekly television program on Comedy Central. It would span five seasons ending in 2002.
- 2001 – Robotica appears on The Learning Channel as a weekly series. The format features tests of power, speed, and manoeuvrability as well as combat. The show ran for three series, ending in 2002.
- 2002 – Foundation of the Robot Fighting League (RFL), a regulatory body composed of the organizers of robot combat events in the United States, Canada, and Brazil. The body produces a unified set of regulations and promotes the sport.
- 2003 – Foundation of the Fighting Robots Association (FRA), a regulatory body managing robot combat events in the United Kingdom and Europe.
- 2004 – Robot Combat is included as an event at the ROBOlympics in San Francisco, California, with competitors from multiple countries. ROBOlympics competitions including Robot Combat run from 2004 to 2008.
- 2008 – ROBOlympics changes its name to RoboGames and, while most events are not combat-related, Robot combat is significantly featured. Events run from 2008 to 2013, 2015–2018, and in 2023. Robot combat matches are live streamed to Twitch starting in 2017.
- 2009 – Three official BattleBots competitions were managed and filmed in the hopes of securing a television sponsorship, though no deals materialized.
- 2013 – Robot Combat League, a fictional Syfy show themed around robot combat, premieres for one season.
- 2015 – BattleBots returns to television as a summer series on the ABC television network; it is renewed for a second season, which aired in the summer of 2016.
- 2016 – Robot Wars returns to British television on BBC2, with two further series in 2017.
- 2017 – Human-piloted "robot" fight: Eagle Prime (produced by MegaBots) vs. Kuratas (produced by Suidobashi Heavy Industries)
- 2018 – After a year long hiatus, BattleBots returns to television on the Discovery Channel and The Science Channel. New seasons of BattleBots have been produced for the network yearly as of 2023. The first seasons of King of Bots (KoB), Fighting my Bot, This Is Fighting Robots (TIFR) and Clash Bots are held and broadcast in China. After the cancellation of Robot Wars by the BBC, Bugglebots, a beetleweight competition featuring former BB, RW, and KoB competitors, is broadcast on YouTube. Another season of Bugglebots is broadcast in 2019. Norwalk Havoc Robot League (NHRL) is founded, an organization that hosts and live streams the largest 3 lb robot combat competition league in the world.
- 2021 – BattleBots: Bounty Hunters, a spin-off of BattleBots, premieres on Discovery+. A sequel series, BattleBots: Champions, premieres in 2022. NHRL expands to 12 and 30 lb weight classes
- 2023 – NHRL rebrands as National Havoc Robot League and becomes the biggest robot combat event in the world, with a $2million+ prize pool at their 3 lb, 12 lb, and 30 lb World Championships.
- 2025 – In Hangzhou, Unitree Robotics hosts a televised kickboxing match for its G1 humanoid robots that are 4 ft (1.2 m) tall and weighed 77 lb (35 kg).
- 2026 – EngineAI debuted a large-scale freestyle combat tournament featuring its T800 humanoid robots, which stand 1.73m tall and weigh 75 kg.

== Rules ==
Robot combat involves remotely controlled robots fighting in a purpose-built arena. A robot loses when it is immobilized, which may be due to damage inflicted by the other robot, being pushed into a position where it cannot drive (though indefinite holds or pins are typically not permitted), or being removed from the arena. Fights typically have a time limit, after which, if no robot is victorious, a judge or judges evaluate the performances to decide upon a winner. The evaluation usually consists of 3 categories such as control, aggression, and damage.

=== Weight classes ===
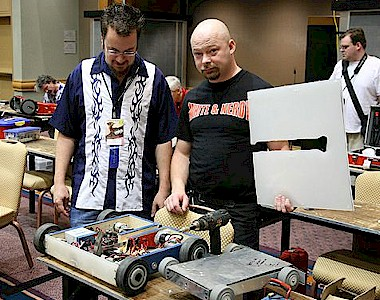
Combat robots in the pit area at the 2007 Robot Battles competition in Atlanta, Georgia

Similar to human combat sports, robot combat is conducted in weight classes though with maximum limits even in the heaviest class. Heavier robots can exert more power and have stronger armor and are generally more difficult and expensive to build.

Class definitions vary between competitions. The below table shows classifications for two organizations: the UK-based Fighting Robots Association (FRA) and the North American SPARC.

Maximum weight per class
Class	FRA	SPARC
Fairyweight	—N/a	0.33 lb (0.15 kg)
Antweight	0.15 kg (0.33 lb)	1 lb (0.45 kg)
Beetleweight	1.5 kg (3.3 lb)	3 lb (1.4 kg)
Mantisweight	—N/a	6 lb (2.7 kg)
Hobbyweight	—N/a	12 lb (5.4 kg)
Dogeweight	—N/a	15 lb (6.8 kg)
Featherweight	13.6 kg (30 lb)	30 lb (14 kg)
Lightweight	30 kg (66 lb)	60 lb (27 kg)
Middleweight	55 kg (121 lb)	120 lb (54 kg)
Heavyweight	110 kg (240 lb)	220 lb (100 kg)
Alternative Heavyweight Class	—N/a	250 lb (110 kg)

There are also competitions specifically for Lego combat robots.

Max Weight at Lego Robot Combat Competitions
Competition	Max Weight
Battle Bricks	2 lb (0.91 kg)
UK competitions	1 kg (2.2 lb)

Most televised events are heavyweights. It's worth noting that the definitions of each weight category have changed over time - with European (FRA) rules for heavyweights advancing from 80 kg, to 100 kg, to 110 kg over time. Currently Battlebots has a weight limit of 250 lb (113 kg). To encourage diversity of design, rules often give an extra weight allotment for robots that can walk rather than roll on wheels.

=== Safety precautions ===
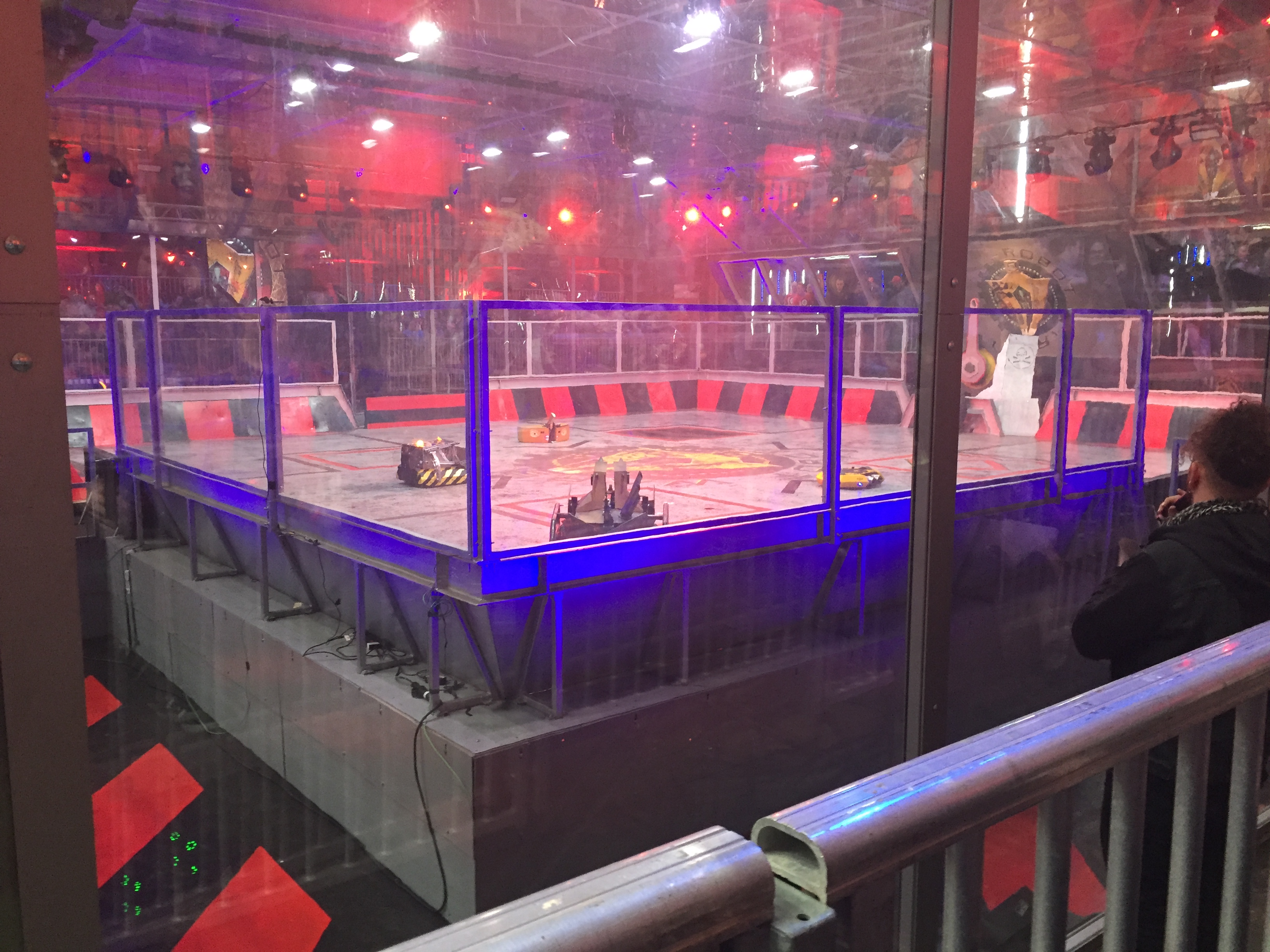
The Robot Wars arena, as pictured for the filming of Robot Wars Series 10 in 2017. Bots pictured are Behemoth (a scoop flipper), Donald Thump (a vertical bar spinner), Sabretooth (a drum spinner), and house robot Shunt (a non-competitor with a lifting scoop and bladed axe).

Given the violent nature of robot fighting, safety is a central factor in the design of the venue, which is generally a sturdy arena, usually constructed of steel, wood, and bullet-resistant clear polycarbonate plastic. The smaller, lighter classes compete in smaller arenas than the heavyweights.

Competition rules set limits on robot construction features that are too dangerous or which could lead to uninteresting contests. Strict limits are placed on materials and pressures used in pneumatic or hydraulic actuators, and fail-safe systems are required for electronic control circuits. Generally off-limits for use as weapons are nets, liquids, deliberate radio jamming, high-voltage electric discharge, untethered projectiles, and usually fire (allowed at NHRL and Battlebots).

=== Robot fighting associations ===
The sport has no overall governing body, though some regional associations oversee several events in managerial or advisory capacities with published rulesets. These include:

- Robot Fighting League (RFL), primarily U.S., 2002–2012
- National Havoc Robot League (NHRL), primarily U.S., 2018–present. The largest robot combat competition in the world. Hosts 3 lb, 12 lb and 30 lb.
- Fighting Robot Association (FRA), U.K and Europe, 2003–present
- Standardised Procedures for the Advancement of Robot Combat (SPARC), U.S., 2015–present

The major televised competitions have operated outside of these associations.

== Combat robot weaponry and design ==
An effective combat robot must have some method of damaging or controlling the actions of its opponent while at the same time protecting itself from aggression. The tactics employed by combat robot operators and the robot designs that support those tactics are numerous. Although some robots have multiple weapons, the more successful competitors concentrate on a single form of attack. This is a list of most of the basic types of weapons. Most robot weaponry falls into one of the following categories:

=== Inactive weaponry ===
Inactive weaponry does not rely on a power source independent from a robot's mobility. Many modern rulesets, such as the rebooted versions of BattleBots and Robot Wars, require robots to have an active weapon to improve the visual spectacle, thus eliminating certain designs such as torque-reaction axlebots and thwackbots, and requiring other designs such as wedges and rammers to incorporate some other kind of weapon.

- Rammer – Robots employing high-power drive trains and heavy armour can use their speed and manoeuvrability to crash into their opponent repeatedly with the hope of damaging weapons and vital components. Their pushing power may also be used to shove their opponent into arena traps. Rammers (AKA 'Bricks') typically have four or six wheels for traction and stability and are often designed to be fully operational when inverted. Because many modern rulesets require all robots to have a moving weapon, modern rammers are often equipped with other weapon types. Robot Wars Series 6 champion Tornado and Series 7 runner-up Storm II were effective rammers. The former used interchangeable weaponry (usually a small spinning drum) while the latter opted for a lifting arm to avoid disqualification. Battlebots 3.0 superheavyweight champion Vladiator was a rammer armed with a small lifting spike.
- Wedge – Similar in concept to a rammer, the wedge uses a low-clearance inclined ramp or scoop to move in under an opponent and break its contact with the arena floor – decreasing its mobility and rendering it easy to push off into a wall or trap. The wedge is also useful in deflecting attacks by other robots. Small wedge-lets are used to lift an opposing bot and feed it to a secondary weapon system. A small wedge may be attached to the rear of a robot with other weaponry for use as a 'backup' in case the main weapon fails. Like rammers, modern wedges must be combined with some other weapon to be legal in some modern competitions. The lower the degree of inclination of the wedge, the higher the chances of lifting the opponent bot from the ground. The 1995 US Robot Wars middleweight champion La Machine was an early and effective static wedge design, as was the Robot Wars Series 1 champion, Roadblock, in 1997. Two-time lightweight BattleBots champion Dr. Inferno Jr. was a low rectangular machine surrounded by hinged wedges. 2018 BattleBots competitor DUCK! utilized a powered lifting wedge. Original Sin is a four-wheeled ramming robot that has won eight heavyweight RoboGames competitions thanks to a combination of durability and hinged wedges. The Panzer series of robots have managed to win several competitions (Robotica season 3 and both seasons of Robot Wars: Extreme Warriors) with six-wheeled drive and a powered or unpowered wedge.
- Thwackbot – A narrow, high-speed, usually two-wheel drive attached to a long boom with an impact weapon on the end creates a robot that can spin in place at a high speed, swinging the weapon in a horizontal circle. The simplicity and durability of the design are appealing, but the robot cannot be made to move in a controlled manner while spinning without employing sophisticated electronics (See Melty-Brain Spinner, below). The 1995 US Robot Wars lightweight champion Test Toaster 1 was a thwackbot, as were T-Wrex and Golddigger from the BattleBots series.
  - Torque Reaction – A variant on the thwackbot is the torque reaction hammer, also known as axlebots. These robots have two very large wheels with the small body of the robot hanging in between them. A long weapon boom has a vertically oriented hammer, pick, or axe on the end. On acceleration, the weapon boom swings upward and over to the rear of the robot to offset the motor torque. When the robot brakes or reverses direction, the weapon will swing forcibly back over the top and hopefully impact the opponent. These robots are simple and can put on a flashy, aggressive show, but their attack power is relatively small and, like thwackbots, they can be hard to control. BattleBots 2.0 middleweight champion Spaz was a torque reaction pickaxe robot, whilst Robot Wars Series 4 Grand Finalist Stinger primarily relied on a bludgeoning mace. BattleBots 3.0–5.0 semifinalist Overkill combined a wedge with a massive swinging blade.

=== Spinners ===
Spinners are weaponry based around blades, cylinders, discs, or bars rotating at high speed around an axis. This is among the most popular and destructive forms of weaponry, thanks to its potential to quickly deliver a high amount of kinetic energy over a small area.

- Saw Blades – A popular weapon in the early years of robotic combat, these robots use a dedicated motor to power either a modified chainsaw or circular saw, or a custom-built cutting disc, usually at high speeds (up to 10,000 rpm). The serrated blade is used to slice through an opponent's armour to try and reach its internal components. These weapons can create spectacular showers of sparks, and are easy to combine with other designs, but can be ineffective against robots with tougher armour. The aforementioned Robot Wars champion Roadblock had a rear-mounted circular saw in addition to its wedge, while Series 4 runner-up Pussycat had a custom cutting disc with four serrated blades. BattleBots 5.0 middleweight runner-up S.O.B. used a wide metal box (a "dustpan") in conjunction with a saw blade mounted on an arm. While true saws are obsolete in higher weight classes, a vertical spinner mounted on an articulating arm has seen renewed popularity in recent years. BattleBots 2023 champion SawBlaze combines a three-pronged dustpan design with a "hammer saw": a spinning blade mounted on a 180º pivoting arm.

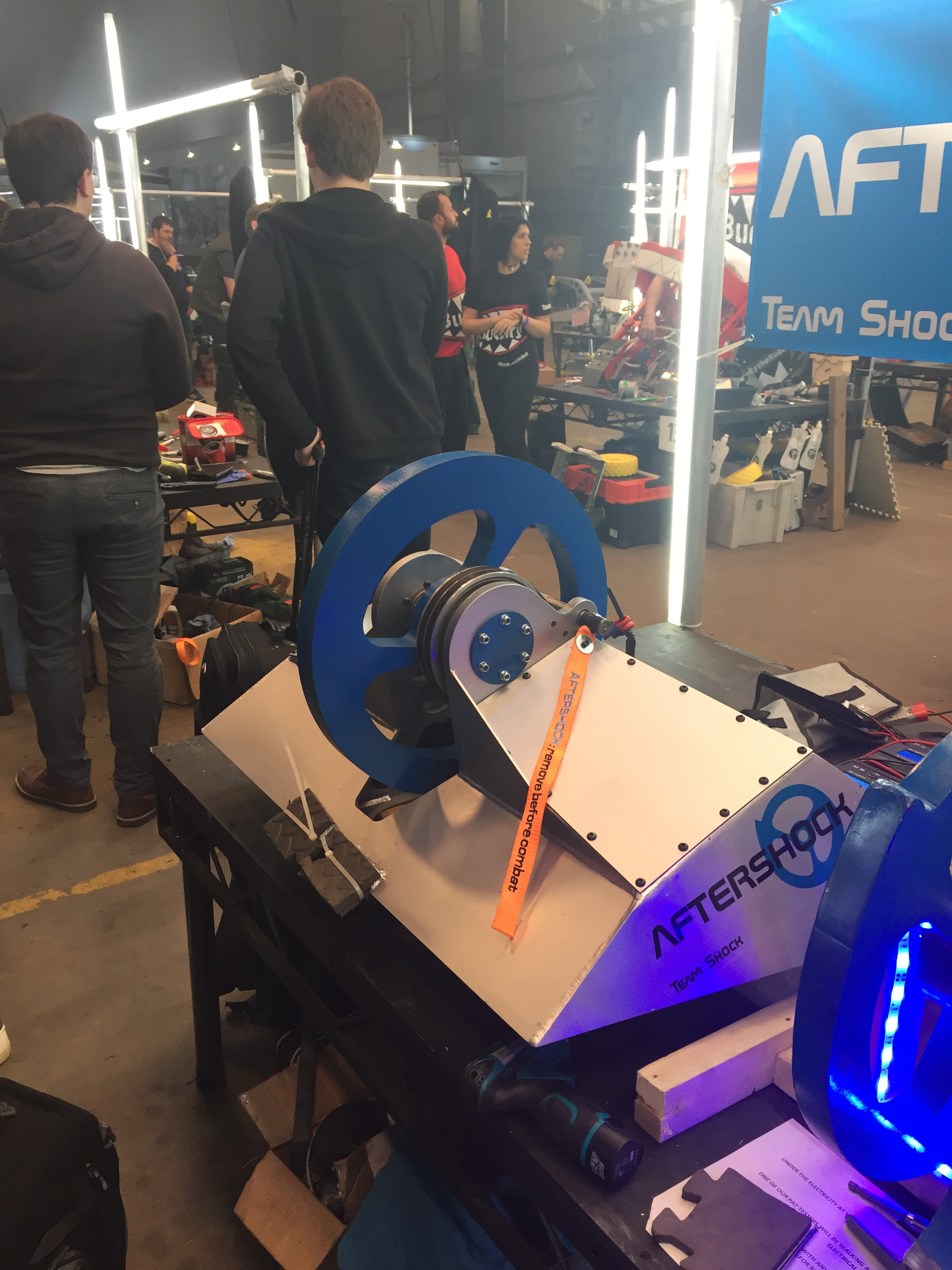
Robot Wars series 9–10 competitor Aftershock used a vertical spinning flywheel to attack opponents.

- Vertical Spinner – A vertical disc or bar spinner consists of a thick circular disc or flat bar mounted on a horizontal axis. Rather than many small teeth to cut like a saw, most spinners have few large teeth to catch opponents and either throw them into the air or rip off chunks of armour. Vertical spinners are ubiquitous at all levels of competition, especially in the US. A majority of BattleBots competitors use spinning vertical discs or bars, and it is the most successful weapon type in the show. Notable robots using vertical spinners include 1.0 lightweight champion Backlash, its heavyweight brother Nightmare, 2018 and 2019 champion Bite Force, and 2021 champion End Game, among many others. 2022 BattleBots champion Tantrum bears a "puncher", with a small vertical spinner mounted on a sliding mechanism. Vertical spinners are less common in Robot Wars, with Series 5–6 competitor S3, Series 7 grand-finalist X-Terminator, and Series 9–10 competitor Aftershock as three notable exceptions.
  - Drum Spinner – Drum spinners are a variant of vertical spinners, consisting of a thick, short cylinder resembling a steamroller's wheel with teeth spinning on a horizontal axis. Drum spinners can accelerate faster than vertical discs or bars, but have less reach. Good drum spinners can land a solid hit almost every time they contact another robot and send it flying as high as a normal vertical disc or bar. Drums are also much thicker, meaning almost the entire front of the robot is taken up by a weapon. Drum spinners tend to suffer from extreme drive issues due to the large amounts of gyroscopic forces. Among the most successful drum spinners are designed by the Brazilian Team RioBotz: BattleBots competitor Minotaur and its RoboGames equivalent, Touro Maximus. Four-wheeled drum spinners are a popular design in China, with RoboGames competitor Chiyung Jinlun and King of Bots competitor Xiake (from the same team) as reliable finalists in televised competitions. Drum spinners are also effective at lower weight classes, such as two-time RoboGames lightweight champion UnMakerBot, NHRL champion beetleweight Shreddit Bro, and the commercially available Weta kit beetleweight bots.
  - Eggbeater – An eggbeater spinner is similar to a drum but uses a broad rectangular frame, rather than a solid cylinder as its choice of weapon shape. Eggbeaters are lighter and have a higher moment of inertia (and thus higher rotational kinetic energy) per unit of mass than drums, but due to their less aerodynamic design, they are usually most effective at lower weight classes. The 3-pound (Beetleweight) robot Lynx has dominated its weight class to such an extent that it temporarily retired to give other teams a chance to win. Robots in heavier weight classes have started to adopt eggbeaters despite high fabrication costs, with Riptide reaching the quarterfinals in its 2022 BattleBots debut and the following season.
  - Vertical discs, bars, drums, and eggbeaters are continuous with each other to the point where it can be difficult to cleanly define each weapon type. For example, BattleBots 2019 and 2022 runner-up Witch Doctor has used a two-toothed "drisc", which is narrower than a drum but broader than a disc. BattleBots competitor Copperhead uses a broad steel drum with notches cut out, giving it similar properties to an eggbeater. Brazilian Team Ua!rrior has fielded successful drisc and eggbeater bots at multiple weight classes, including Federal M.T. (four-time RoboGames lightweight champion), General (two-time RoboGames middleweight champion), and Black Dragon (2019–present BattleBots competitor)

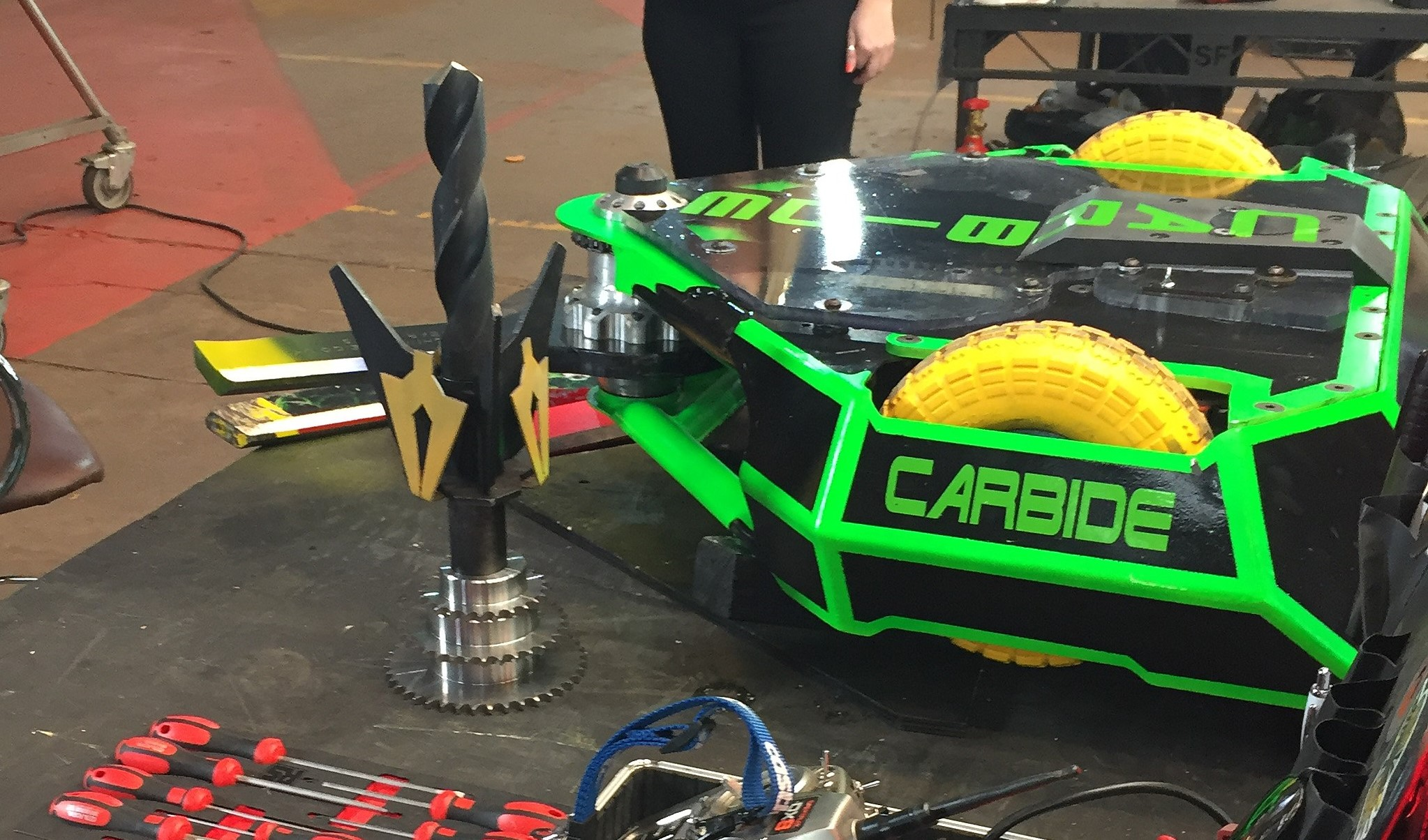
Robot Wars series 9 champion Carbide was a two-wheeled bot with a horizontal spinning bar

- Horizontal Spinner – Horizontal spinners rotate around a vertical axis, with the rotating blade or disc typically mounted below, under, or at mid-height on the front of the robot. Undercutters have a spinner low enough almost to scrape the ground. Thanks to their broad reach, horizontal spinners can impart large impacts and may throw other robots across the arena floor. Tombstone, a spinner armed with a horizontal bar, was the champion of BattleBots 2016, and its sister machine Last Rites has been a renowned competitor in RoboGames since 2005. Notable British horizontal spinners include Hypno-Disc (a grand finalist in Robot Wars series 3–5) and Carbide (champion of Robot Wars series 9). Some robots have a bar-shaped horizontal spinner mounted above the center of a low rectangular chassis. Horizontal spinners with this design include three-time BattleBots middleweight champion Hazard, American mid–late 2000s competitor Brutality, and modern Battlebots competitors Icewave and Bloodsport.
- Full Body Spinner – Taking the concept of the spinner to the extreme, a full-body spinner rotates a massive horizontally spinning mechanism around the entire circumference of the robot as a stored energy weapon. Other robot components (batteries, weapon motor casing) may be attached to the shell to increase the spinning mass while keeping the mass of the drive train to a minimum. Full body spinners require more time to spin the weapon up to speed, typically cannot self-right without the assistance of stabilizing bars, and can be unstable — the original BattleBots competitor Mauler was an infamous example in its first few years of competition.
  - Shell spinner – Shell spinners are the most common variety of full-body spinner, encasing the robot in a spinning shell powered from below by an electric motor. These shells may be cylindrical, conical, or dome-shaped. The 1995 US Robot Wars heavyweight co-champion Blendo was the first effective shell spinner, with its weapon derived from a metal wok. Among the most successful shell spinners are three-time BattleBots lightweight champion Ziggo and Robot Wars Series 7 champion Typhoon 2. Some shell spinners have competed nearly continuously since 2001, including Team LOGICOM's Shrederator series and Team Robotic Death Company's Megabyte. Both teams have seen success in untelevised and televised events in the United States and China.
  - Ring / Rim spinner – Robots with ring or rim spinners impact opponents with a ring-shaped blade or battering surface spinning around the circumference of the chassis. These designs have the advantage of invertibility, at the cost of complexity, since they rely on a series of gears to translate motor power to the external ring. BattleBots 2016 competitor The Ringmaster is an example of a ring-spinner.
  - Cage / Overhead spinner – A cage spinner impacts opponents with a spinning open frame resembling a helicopter rotor rather than a solid shell. These spinners are particularly uncommon. The most notable example is BattleBots 3.0 heavyweight champion Son of Whyachi, armed with bludgeoning hammerheads attached to a triangular spinning frame.
  - Full-body drum spinner – A full-body drum spinner is similar in construction to a thwackbot, with a tubular two-wheeled chassis encased by a vertically spinning cylindrical shell. These designs are rare and notoriously unreliable despite their high damage potential. Examples include Robot Wars competitor Barber-Ous and BattleBots competitor Axe Backwards.
  - Melty-Brain Spinner (also known as Tornado Drive or Translational Drift)– A variation of the full-body spinner designed to operate without an independent weapon motor. These robots utilize a complex combination of rotational sensors and fine motor control to drive in such a way that the entire robot can simultaneously rotate on the spot and move across an arena in a controlled manner. The drive is usually implemented with an LED light system that indicates to the driver the direction the robot will move when commanded to move forward. This kind of design tends to be incorporated into invertible builds and requires a spin-up time like other spinners. One of the earliest known examples of this kind of robot is BattleBots lightweight Herr Gepoünden, a thwackbot that reached the quarter-finals of season 3.0 and persisted in untelevised competitions until 2024, long past the heyday of other lightweight thwackbots. The most successful heavyweight melty-brain spinner is Nuts 2, which had chains connected to two "flail" weapons on either side of the machine. Nuts 2 ultimately finished joint 3rd (with Behemoth) in Series 10 of Robot Wars, ending the dominant run of Series 8 finalist and Series 9 champion Carbide along the way by breaking the robot's weapon chain. Additionally, NHRL competitor Project Liftoff has also seen a considerable degree of success with melty-brain technology.

=== Control bot weaponry ===
- Lifter – Using tactics similar to a wedge, the lifter uses a powered arm, prow, or platform to get underneath the opponent and lift it away from the arena surface to remove its maneuverability. The lifter may then push the other robot toward arena traps or attempt to toss the opponent onto its back. The lifter is typically powered by either an electric or pneumatic actuator. Lifters were most effective in older competitions when self-righting mechanisms and high-power weaponry were less common. Two-time US Robot Wars and four-time BattleBots heavyweight champion Biohazard used an electric lifting arm to great effect. Lifting forks were utilized by Robot Wars series 2 champion Panic Attack and two-time BattleBots heavyweight champion Vlad the Impaler. Thanks to their narrow profile and simplicity, lifters are often combined with other weaponry. Sewer Snake, four-time RoboGames heavyweight champion, was a six-wheeled rammer with a lifting wedge. Modern BattleBots competitor Whiplash has seen success by combining a small spinning disc and lifting arm into a single weapon. In recent years, robots across multiple weight classes have employed the use of "cam lifters", which are thin blades that rotate axially to high-center opponents. This lifter variation was first employed in 2020 and has been employed by the NHRL 2023 Finals beetleweight runner-up Supreme Ruler to great effect.

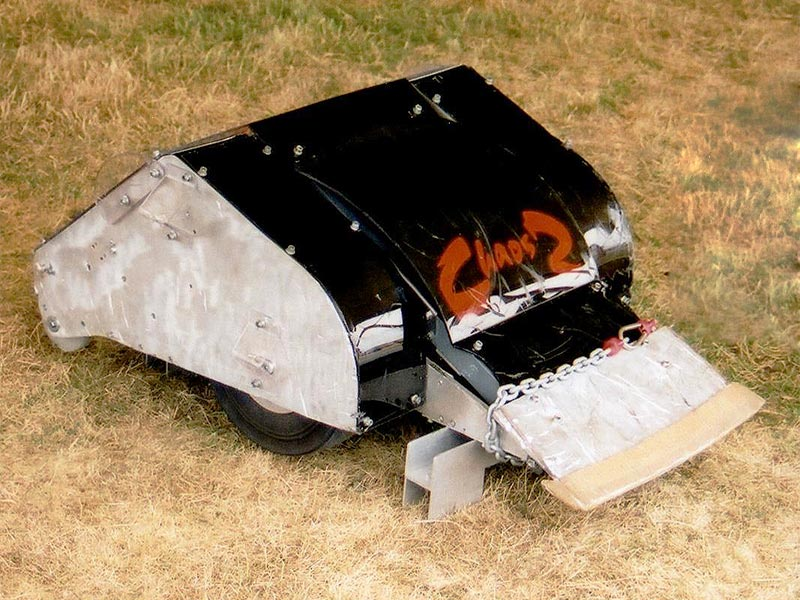
Robot Wars series 3–4 champion Chaos 2, a British robot armed with a rear-hinged CO_{2}-powered pneumatic flipping plate. Active from 1999 to 2002.

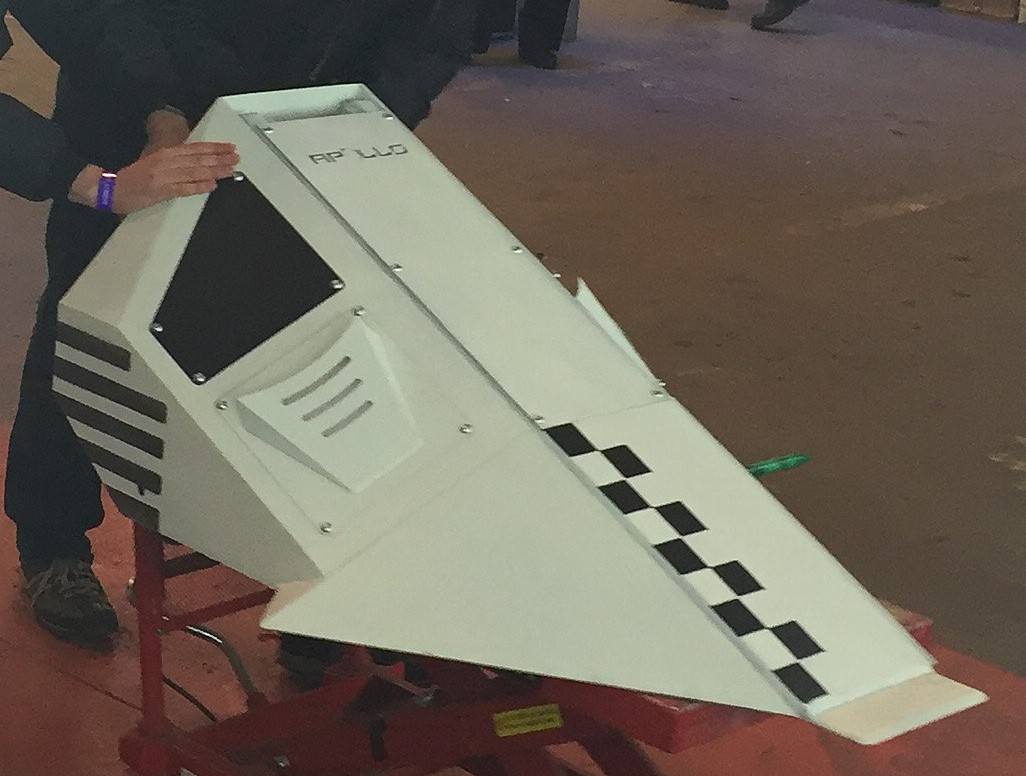
Robot Wars series 8 champion Apollo, with similar weaponry in 2017.

- Flipper – Although mechanically resembling a lifter, the flipper uses much higher levels of pneumatic power to launch a lifting arm or panel upward at high acceleration similar to a catapult. An effective flipper can throw opponents end-over-end through the air, causing damage from the landing impact or, in Robot Wars, toss it completely out of the arena. Flippers use a large volume of compressed gas and often have a limited number of effective attacks before their supply runs low.
  - CO_{2}-powered flippers are among the most abundant weapon types in UK heavyweight competitions. The two-time Robot Wars champion Chaos 2 used a flipping plate powerful enough to throw other robots out of the arena. Other successful Robot Wars flippers include Series 5 runner-up Bigger Brother, Series 8 champion Apollo, and Series 10 champion Eruption, among many others. Behemoth, armed with a flipping scoop, has been competing continuously since Series 2 in 1998 and finally reached joint 3rd place in Series 10 in 2017. Some British flippers have been significantly more successful in untelevised competitions, such as Ripper, Kronic, and the Iron Awe series. British flippers have also competed in China, including Vulcan (from Team Apollo) and Tánshè (TIFR runner-up, from Team Hurtz).
  - While most flippers operate with the flipping mechanism hinged at the machine's rear, Robot Wars' Firestorm achieved remarkable success with a front-hinged flipper, placing third in Robot Wars on three separate occasions (Series 3, 5, and 6) and never failing to advance to the series' semifinal rounds. Robot Wars Series 2 runner-up Cassius also utilized a front-hinged flipping arm.
  - Most American flippers utilize Nitrogen gas, though carbon dioxide was also used back in the old Battlebots, but this gas has been banned now. Team Inertia Labs has had great success in BattleBots with robots utilizing a characteristic flipping arm design. Their machines include BattleBots 4.0 superheavyweight champion Toro, BattleBots 5.0 middleweight champion T-Minus, and BattleBots 2015 semi-finalist Bronco. A similar flipping mechanism was used by 2006–2010 RoboGames superheavyweight competitor Ziggy, a machine so dominant that it has been attributed as one of several factors responsible for the retirement of the superheavyweight class. Ziggy's heavyweight successor, Ziggy Jr., competes in BattleBots under the name Lucky.
  - Experimental flippers have seen some success in recent seasons of BattleBots. Hydra, introduced by Team Whyachi in 2019, is able to store a huge number of powerful flips by relying on compressed hydraulic fluid rather than pneumatic gas. Blip, introduced by Team Seems Reasonable in 2021, powers its flipping plate using energy stored in a cord wound by an electric flywheel.
  - Stabber – Mechanically similar to the flipper is the stabber, a rare weapon type that throws or stabs opponents forward with a pneumatic spike. An effective stabber can penetrate into the opponent, damage vital inner parts. When they fail to penetrate, they throw their opponent back across the arena into walls or traps. Stabbers typically use a large volume of compressed gas, which limits the number of times they can fire their weapon in a fight. Classic BattleBots superheavyweight competitor Rammstein was a stabber.
- Clamper / Grabber – Clampers and Grabbers are an example of robots oriented around controlling and grappling their opponents rather than direct damage. They make use of an arm or claw that descends from above to secure the opposing robot in place on a wedge or lifting platform. In some clampers, the entire assembly may lift and carry the opponent wherever the operator pleases: these were called grapplers. Diesector, the superheavyweight champion of BattleBots 2.0 and 5.0, combined an electric clamper with smaller hammer arms. Middleweight BattleBots 4.0 runner-up Complete Control was another successful lifting clamper. Big Nipper, a horizontal grabber/lifter, won several untelevised championships in the UK after the end of Robot Wars. Bite Force won the 2015 season of BattleBots using a grabbing arm as its only form of weaponry, though in subsequent series its design was modified into a vertical spinner on a four-wheeled chassis.
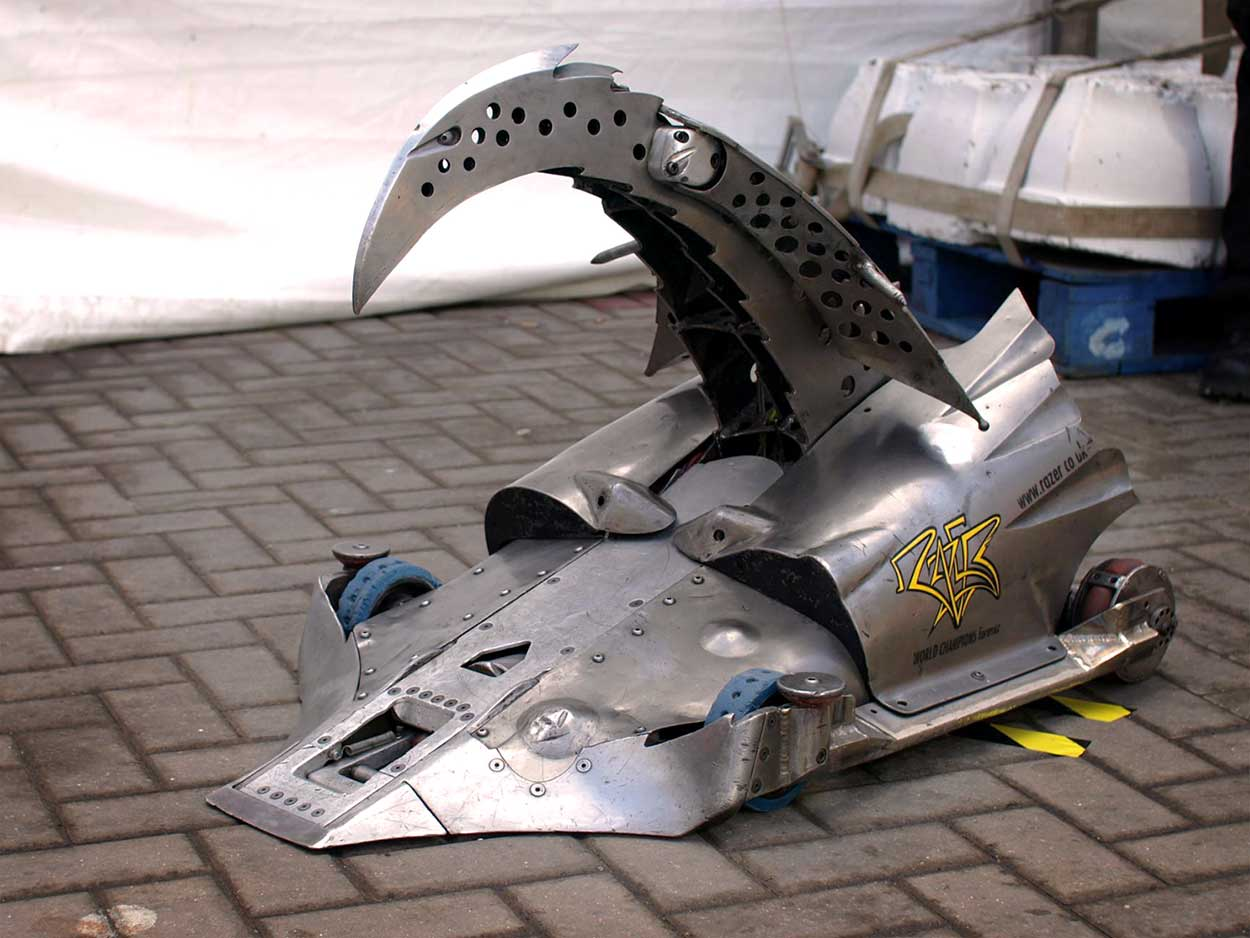
  Robot Wars series 5 (2002) champion Razer, one of the most successful crushers in the hobby.
- Crusher – Crushers are similar to grabbers, though they emphasize damage via one or more piercing hydraulic arms. Like flywheels, crushers can be separated into horizontal and vertical variants. Robot Wars Series 5 champion Razer was the first vertical crusher, and by far the most successful of its era. Another UK-built vertical crusher, Spectre, won the first King of Bots tournament in 2018, and has competed in BattleBots 2019 and 2023 under the name Quantum. Two-time Robot Wars Annihilator champion Kan-Opener was armed with a pair of horizontal crushing claws, one of the few examples of a successful horizontal crusher.

=== Hammers and axes ===
- Swinging an overhead axe, spike, or hammer at high speed onto an opponent offers another method of attacking the vulnerable top surface. The weapon is typically driven by a pneumatic or electric actuator via a rack and pinion or direct mechanical linkage. The attack may damage the opposing robot directly or may lodge in their robot and provide a handle for dragging them toward a trap. Several successful hammerbots have been designed by UK's Team Hurtz: Battlebots 1.0 heavyweight semi-finalist Killerhurtz was armed with a spike-headed pneumatic axe, Robot Wars Series 6 grand finalist Terrorhurtz possessed a two-bladed pneumatic axe, and Battlebots 2016 quarter-finalist Beta utilized an electric hammer. Robot Wars Series 2 grand finalist Killertron was one of the earliest effective examples of an axebot, with a two-headed electrically powered pickaxe. Other successful hammerbots include Deadblow (BattleBots 1.0 middleweight runner-up), FrenZy (BattleBots 2.0 heavyweight semi-finalist), Dominator 2 (Robot Wars series 4–6 competitor), Thor (Robot Wars series 6–10 competitor), Chomp (BattleBots 2016 quarter-finalist), and Shatter! (BattleBots 2021 quarter-finalist). Chomp is a rare example of a combat robot with autonomous technology, with hardware and software integrated so that it always faces its opponent during a match.

=== Interchangeable weaponry ===
It is increasingly common for robots to have interchangeable weaponry or other modular components, allowing them to adapt to a wide range of opponents and increasing their versatility; such robots are often referred to as "Swiss army bots", in reference to Swiss army knives. Arguably the earliest example was Robot Wars Series 1 contestant Plunderbird, which could change between a pneumatic spike and a circular saw on an extendable arm. Successful Swiss army bots include Robot Wars Series 6 champion Tornado, BattleBots 2016 runner-up Bombshell, Battlebots 2020 quarterfinalist and 2023 semifinalist Ribbot, and top-ranked US Beetleweight Silent Spring.

Sometimes, robots that were not originally Swiss army bots have had their weapons changed or altered on the fly, typically due to malfunctions. In BattleBots 2015, Ghost Raptor's spinning bar weapon broke in its first fight; builder Chuck Pitzer then improvised new weapons for each following fight, including a "De-Icer" arm attachment which it used to unbalance and defeat bar spinner Icewave in the quarter-finals.

=== Prohibited weaponry ===
Since the first robot combat competitions, some types of weapons have been prohibited either because they violated the spirit of the competition or they could not be safely used. Prohibited weapons have generally included:

- Radio jamming
- High voltage electric discharge
- Liquids (glue, oil, water, corrosives...)
- Fire (except in the new BattleBots and National Havoc)
- Explosives
- Un-tethered projectiles (except in BattleBots from 2018 season onwards)
- Entanglers (except in Robot Wars from series 10 onwards)
- Lasers above 1 milliwatt
- Visual obstruction
- Halon – a specific fire-extinguishing gas effective as a weapon in stopping internal combustion engines. Note that current rules do not specifically ban Halon as it is no longer commercially available.

Individual competitions have made exceptions to the above list. Notably, the Robotica competitions allowed flame weapons and the release of limited quantities of liquids on a case-by-case basis. The modern series of BattleBots also permits the use of flamethrowers and, as of 2016, untethered projectiles, provided that the latter are merely for show. Competitions may also restrict or ban certain otherwise legal weapons, such as banning spinners and other high-power weapons at events where the arena is not able to contain these weapons, and the new Battlebots recently banned usage of carbon dioxide gas. A well-known example of this is the Sportsman ruleset.

Arena traps have also been granted exceptions to the list of prohibited weapons. Robot Wars in particular used flame devices both in the stationary traps and on one of the roaming "House Robots".

=== Unusual weaponry and tactics ===
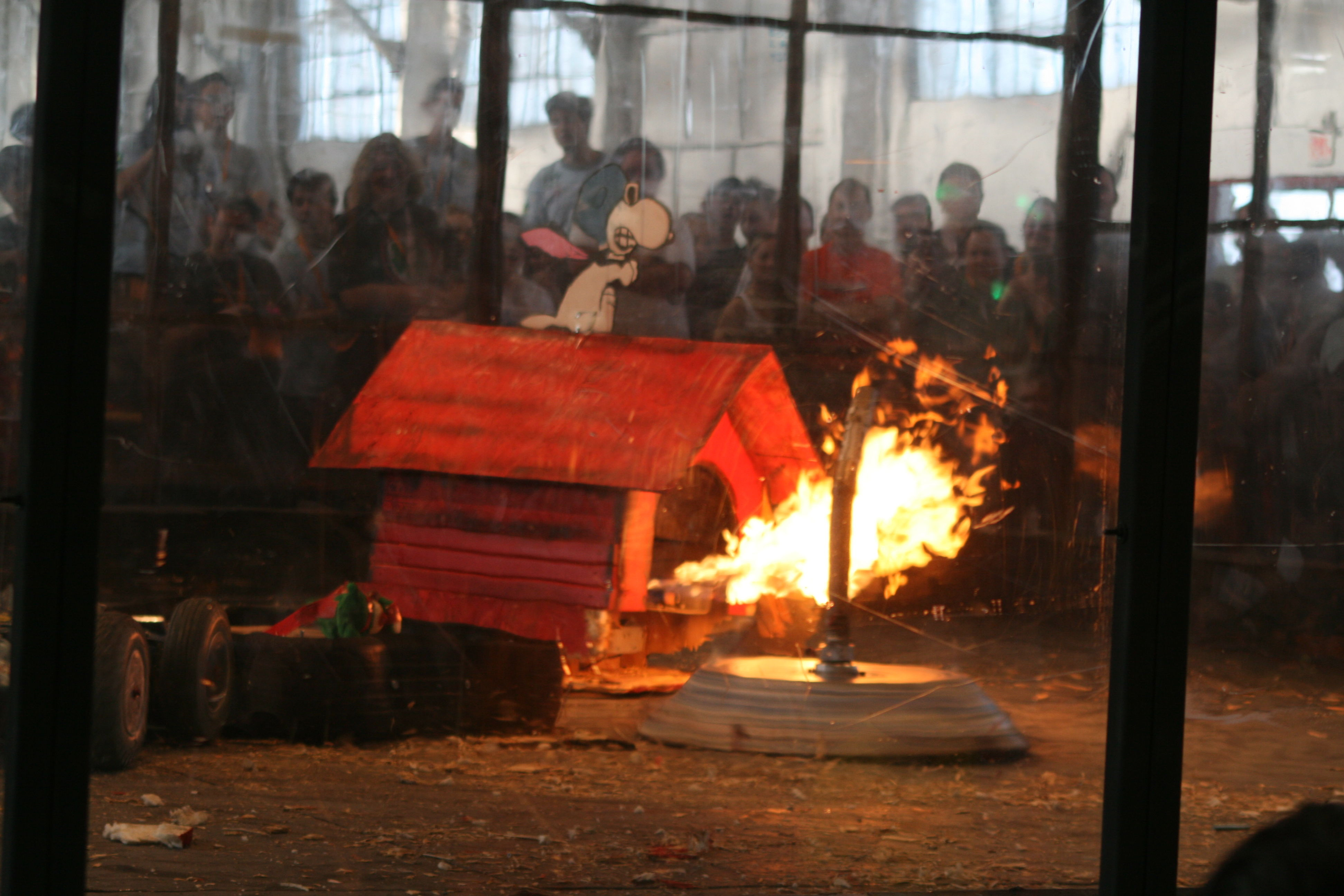
A heavyweight rumble from RoboGames 2007, featuring Red Baron (a dog house-themed robot with a flamethrower), Megabyte (a silver full-body spinner), Mulch (a black boxy robot), and Little Blue Engine (a blue four-wheeled rammer)

A very wide variety of unusual weapons and special design approaches have been tried with varying success and several types of weapons would have been tried had they not been prohibited.

- SRiMech – Many robots are incapable of driving inverted (upside-down), due to their shape, weaponry, or both. However, others risk immobilization if turned over off of their wheels. A SRiMech (self-righting mechanism) is not inherently a form of weaponry, but rather a design element that returns an inverted robot to mobility in the upright state. The SRiMech is typically an electric or pneumatic arm or extension on the upper surface of the robot which pushes against the arena floor to roll or flip the robot upright. Most flippers, some lifters, and even some carefully designed axes or vertical spinners can double as SRiMechs. Team Nightmare's lightweight vertical spinner Backlash was designed such that when flipped it would hit the ground with the spinning disc and kick back upright (though this never worked). The first successful unaided use of an SRiMech in competition was at the 1997 U.S. Robot Wars, when the immobilized Vlad the Impaler used a dedicated pneumatic device to pop back upright in a match against Biohazard. The first competitor to use a SRiMech in a televised competition was Cassius, using its front-hinged flipping arm to right itself in Robot Wars series 2.
- Entangling weapons – Several early US Robot Wars competitors sought to immobilize their opponents with entangling weapons. Nets and streamers of adhesive tape were both tried with mixed success. Entangling weapons were prohibited in Robot Wars and BattleBots from 1997 onward, but the Robotica competitions allowed nets, magnets, and other entanglers on a case-by-case basis, and Robot Wars allowed limited use of entanglers in Series 10. One of the more infamous recent usages of entanglers was a BattleBots fight between Complete Control and Ghost Raptor in the first reboot season, where a net was hidden in a "present" held by Complete Control and rammed into Ghost Raptor, jamming the spinner and other mechanics. The match was stopped, but Derek Young, the driver and captain of Complete Control, mentioned that entanglers weren't explicitly forbidden in the new ruleset, which was true, but a rematch was scheduled with the explicit note of nets being forbidden from then on.
- Flame weapons – Although prohibited for use by competitors in Robot Wars and the first edition (2000–05) of BattleBots, the rules for Robotica, the Robot Fighting League, and the post-2015 version of BattleBots do allow flame weapons under some circumstances. RFL super heavyweight competitor Alcoholic Stepfather (unique for using mecanum wheels for movement around an arena) and Robotica competitor Solar Flare, as well as the later BattleBots series competitors Free Shipping and overhead pneumatic-pickaxe armed Chomp employing gaseous flamethrower weapons. Gruff is a BattleBots competitor that competed with its main weapon solely as a high-power flamethrower (two as of season 5) with the help of a lifter, with moderate success. Flamethrowers are seldom effective weapons, mainly due to their effectiveness being limited for safety reasons, but are audience favorites. However, flamethrower robots have seen recent success at National Havoc Robot League since plastic is a common building material, with robots like Dutch Oven and Mixtape regularly making deep runs in qualifying events and both making the knockout phase of the 2024 NHRL World Championships. The most successful flamethrower robot at NHRL is undoubtedly Clyde, which has earned multiple podium finishes at Championship Qualifier events and won the June 2024 Golden Dumpster.
- Smothering weapons – The BattleBots and Robot Wars lightweight competitor Tentoumushi used a large plastic sandbox cover shaped like a ladybug ("tentoumushi" being Japanese for ladybug) on a powered arm to drop down over opposing robots, covering and encircling them. Once covered, it was difficult to tell what the opponent was doing and who was dragging whom around the arena. One version of the robot had a circular saw concealed under the cover to inflict physical damage, another had a small grappling hook.
- Tethered projectiles – Although tethered projectiles are specifically allowed and discussed in major rules sets, their use is quite rare. Neptune fought at BattleBots 3.0 with pneumatic spears on tethers, but was unable to damage its opponent. During a friendly weapons test, Team Juggerbot allowed the builders of Neptune to take a couple shots against their bot. One of two shots penetrated an aluminum panel below the main armor, while the other bounced off the top armor.
- Multibots (clusterbots) – A single robot that breaks apart into multiple, independently controlled robots has appealed to a few competitors. The Robot Wars heavyweight Gemini and the BattleBots middleweight Pack Raptors were two-part multibots that had some success. The rules concerning clusterbots have varied over the years, either stating that 50% of the clusterbot has to be immobilised to eliminate the robot from the tournament (in the Dutch version of Robot Wars, there was a 3-part multibot named √3, and although one of its parts was tossed out of the arena by Matilda, the robot as a whole was still deemed mobile, and the other 2 parts of √3 did enough to win the match), or that all of a multibot's segments have to be incapacitated before a knock-out victory can be declared, and members without active weapons no longer count. Current Robot Fighting League match rules require the latter to be achieved. In recent years, successful heavyweight multibots include Thunder and Lightning (a pair of vertical spinners that came in 4th place in King of Bots season 1) and Crash n' Burn (a pair of wedgebots competing in RoboGames). Multibots have seen great success at NHRL because the ruleset grants them a 33% weight bonus, with beetleweights Booty Brigade and Repeater winning the 2023 and 2024 Finals respectively.
- Minibots (nuisancebots) – Similar to the concept of multibots, minibots are small robots, typically no larger than a featherweight, that fight alongside a larger main robot with the aim of harassing or distracting opponents. They are often sacrificial in nature and have minimal weaponry. BattleBots 2015 competitor Witch Doctor was accompanied by a featherweight minibot named Shaman which was equipped with a flamethrower, and which gained significant popularity for its spirited performances during battles. Other Battlebots competitors also successfully used minibots such as Son of Whyachi in 2016, and 2018 competitor WAR Hawk and their beetleweight minibot WAR Stop, which was equipped with a wedge. The cam lifter minibot Needle debuted alongside Tracer in 2020 and has since competed with Jackpot under the alias Ace.
- Halon gas – Rhino fought at the 1997 U.S. Robot Wars event with a halon gas fire extinguisher, which was very effective at stopping internal combustion engines. Gas weapons of this nature were promptly prohibited from future competitions.
- Pneumatic Cannon – First implemented by season eight Battlebots competitor Double Jeopardy, the robot fired off a 5-pound (2.3 kg) "slug" at 190 mph (310 km/h), exerting 4,500 pounds-force (20,000 N) upon impact. This robot, however, did not perform well during its competition, as it only had one shot at landing a good hit: from there, it would have to rely on pushing its opponents, at which it failed. It subsequently upgraded its cannon to be more powerful and added the ability to fire more than one shot, though as of its last appearance in 2021, it has only one win under its belt.

== Unusual propulsion ==
The great majority of combat robots roll on wheels, which are very effective on the smooth surfaces used for typical robot combat competition. Other propulsion strategies do pop-up with some frequency.

- Tank treads – Numerous combat robots have used treads or belts in place of wheels in an attempt to gain additional traction. Treads are generally heavier and more vulnerable to damage than a wheeled system and offer no particular traction advantage on the types of surfaces common in robot combat. Most uses of treads are for their striking appearance. The Robot Wars competitors Track-tion, 101 and Mortis along with the BattleBots super heavyweight Ronin used treads. Biteforce, the winner of the 2015 Battlebots Competitions, originally used magnets embedded in its treads in an attempt to gain extra downforce without extra weight. Current users of treads include 2022–2023 NHRL champion and BattleBots contestant Emulsifier and BattleBots fan-favorite Rusty.
- Walking – The spectacle of a multi-legged robot walking across the arena into combat is a big audience favorite. Robot combat rules typically have given walking robots an additional weight allowance to offset their slower speed, the complexity of the mechanism, and to encourage their construction. What the event organizers had in mind was something like the spider-legged robot Mechadon, but what most often was produced were simple rule-shaving propulsion systems that attempted to save as much of the extra weight allowance as possible for additional weaponry. Attempts at more restrictive definitions of "Walking" have effectively eliminated walking robots from competition. BattleBots heavyweight champion Son of Whyachi used a controversial cam-driven "Shufflebot" propulsion system, which was promptly declared ineligible for additional weight allowance at subsequent competitions. The most recent true walker to appear on BattleBots was the 2020 iteration of Chomp, a 500 pounds (230 kg) robot that moved using six legs and was equipped with a hammer and flamethrower system on a turret. The enormous walker still retained similar autonomous technology as its predecessor, but it was extremely slow and had a below-average win record.
- Gyroscopic precession – Used in the Antweight robot Gyrobot, as well as the Battlebots competitor Wrecks, this system uses a gyroscope and stationary feet that lift as the entire robot rotates due to gyroscopic precession when the gyroscope is tilted by a servo motor. This design can use the gyroscope as a spinning weapon (horizontal or vertical) which allows for efficient double-usage of the gyroscope mass. Although Gyrobot and Wrecks appear to be walking as it translates across the arena, they are not classified as walking robots under current rules. This unusual drive train produces strange and often unpredictable movements, though has shown to be successful in combat.
- Torque reaction - Torque reaction has seen use in lower weight classes for both weaponry and locomotion. A famous example of this is in the beetleweight Droopy, which alters the speed of its two angled horizontal spinners to waddle forwards and turn via self-induced gyroscopic precession and the conservation of angular momentum. Full-bodied beetleweight drum spinner robots Noob Tube and Bee Roll use two powerful motors to simultaneously drive their wheels and weapon as a result of this principle.
- Suction fan – Several competitors experimented with the use of fans to evacuate air from a low-clearance shell to suck the robot down onto the arena surface and add traction. Robotica competitor Armorgeddon used a suction fan to increase traction and pushing power, and Robot Wars and Battlebots competitor Killerhurtz experimented with use of a suction fan to counter the forces from its hammer/axe weapon, a system that was demonstrated as giving the robot the ability to climb walls but was never utilised in combat. Similar designs have appeared in robot-sumo competitions where traction is a key factor.
- Magnetic Wheels – Another approach to gaining traction and stability involves the use of rare-earth magnets, either ring-shaped as wheels or simply attached to the robot's base. This is, naturally, only effective in arenas that have magnetic metal surfaces. Due to the expense of large ring magnets, this trick has been used almost exclusively in three-pound and under "insect class" robots, although a lightweight battlebot General Gau tried implementing them. A multibot named Hammer and Anvil would later use magnets in the lightweight category, with some success. Heavyweight Robotica competitor Hot Wheels attempted to use a large chassis-mounted magnet to gain traction and apparent weight, and Beta unsuccessfully attempted to use an electromagnet to counter the reaction forces of its massive hammer weapon at the BattleBots competition. This however was removed for future competitions as the power of the magnets rendered the robot unable to move.
- Mecanum wheels – Together with a specialized motor control system, mecanum wheels allow controlled motion in any direction without turning, as demonstrated by Alcoholic Stepfather in a 2004 match, and by the hammer-wielding Battlebots competitor Shatter! in 2019.
- Flying – The 1995 US Robot Wars event had a flying competitor: S.P.S. #2 was a lighter-than-air craft buoyed by three weather balloons and propelled by small electric fans. It attempted to drop a net on the opponent. Nearly invulnerable to attack, it won the first match against Orb of Doom (see reference below), but ventured too close to the arena floor in the second match and was dragged down and "popped". Starting in 2016, BattleBots permitted the use of drones as "nuisance bots"; these typically proved hard to control, and one was memorably swatted out of the air by a rake that competitor HyperShock had attached to its lifting forks. These drones are usually armed with flamethrowers, but there is no evidence that these have ever had an effect on the opponent, and as of World Championship VII, only one drone, named Spitfire, remains, and it is used very infrequently.
- Rolling sphere – The aforementioned Orb of Doom was a featherweight competitor at the 1995 US Robot Wars. It consisted of a lightweight, rigid shell made of carbon fiber-kevlar cloth and polyester resin, applied over a foam core pattern. Inside was an offset-weight mechanism made from a battery-powered electric drill. A similar-looking robot named Psychosprout appeared in the UK Robot Wars.
- Rolling tube – Snake competed at Battlebots and the US Robot Wars using a series of actuators to bend its triangular cross-section tubular body to roll, writhe, and slither across the arena.
- Shuffling – refers to the movement of robots that are propelled by a cam-driven system. See Walking
- Brush Drive – Similar to Gyroscopic precession, brush drive uses brushes affixed to the bottom of the robot, akin to non-combat bristlebots. These work in tandem with a pair of vertical spinning weapons to make the robot slide across the arena. This form of locomotion has been utilized by RoboGames 2017 competitor Clean Sweeper. Alternatively, brush drive has been shown to work with slightly offset horizontal spinners, as the infamous NHRL featherweight Depth Charge could vibrate across the arena via two massive steel discs that were powerful enough to breach the arena's inner layer.
- Magnets and Rapid Deceleration – While it has never been done, an entrant to Battlebots' seventh season, titled Bad Penny, had planned on using a magnetic system combined with a braking system to move their robot around the arena. Six magnets would pull down on the floor with over 2000 pounds (~909 kilograms) of force. To move, the robot would rely on rapidly braking its spinning ring, which was around the entire robot, while simultaneously turning off five of the six magnets. This, in turn, would force the robot to pivot around the one magnet still on.
- Hopping – Using pneumatic legs or spikes, robots such as the featherweight Spazhammer were capable of moving around the arena by repeatedly stabbing the floor.
- Propeller – No Fly Zone, an antweight competing at RoboGames since 2015, drives forwards using thrust generated by a diagonal spinning bar on the front of the robot, similar to an airplane propeller. There is only a single wheel on the back of the robot, used for steering rather than forward movement. A similar heavyweight machine, Crossfire, competed in the first season of King of Bots.

== Robot-sumo ==
Robot-sumo is a related sport where robots try to shove each other out of a ring rather than destroy or disable each other. Unlike remote-controlled combat robots, machines in these competitions are often automated.

== Humanoids ==
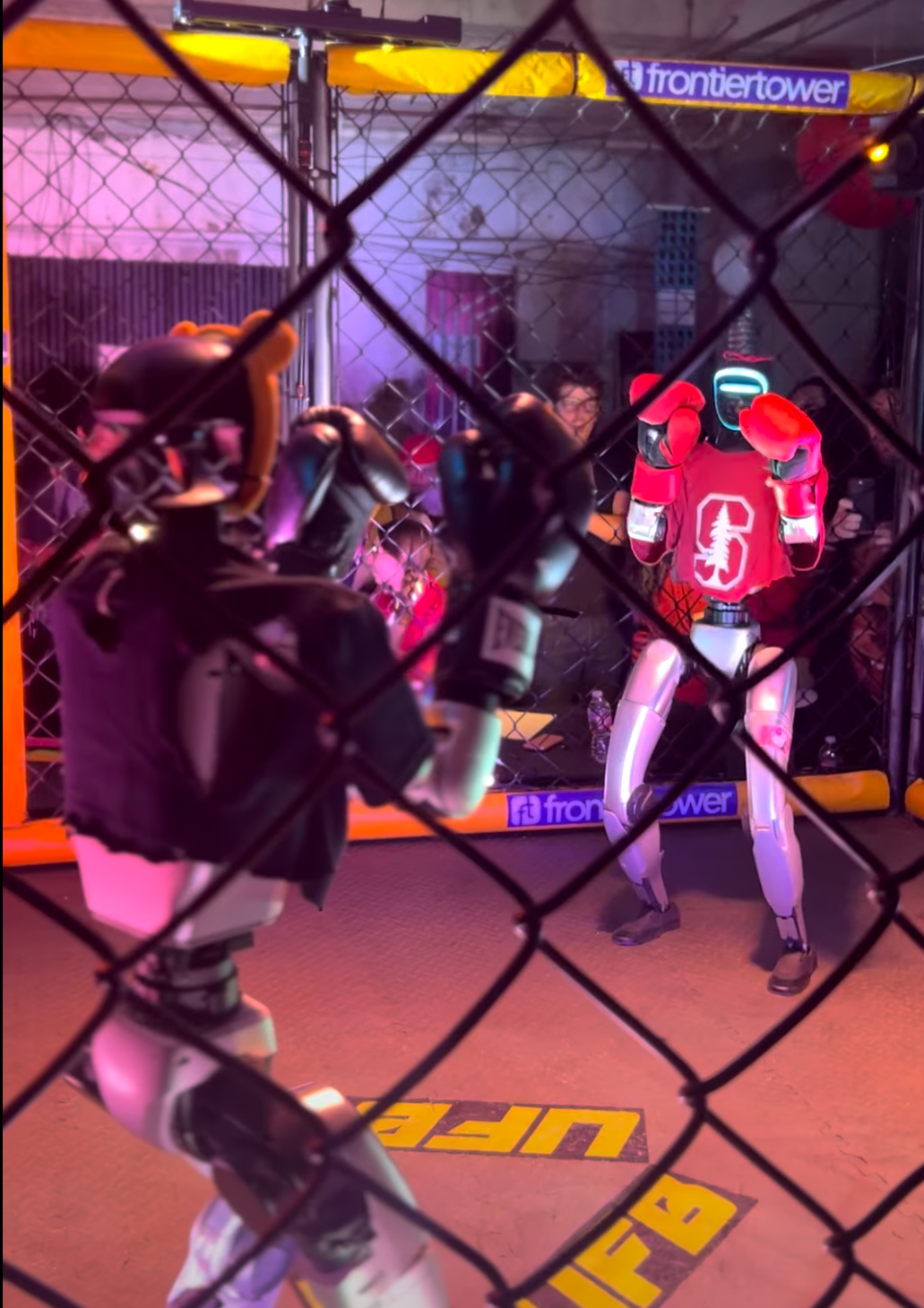

Humanoids are robots that are shaped like humans. They can rely on speed reducers in their compact human-like joints to help convert the high-speed rotation of electric motors into the high torque and precise motion required for human-like movements.

In recent years, there have been organized fighting matches between humanoid robots. One of the earliest examples occurred in Hangzhou in 2025 where Unitree Robotics displayed an exhibition fight using G1 humanoid robots that stood 4 ft (1.2 m) tall and weighed 77 lb (35 kg). The G1, that were remote-controlled by humans, wore gloves and were able to throw jabs, uppercuts, and some kicks.

In July 2026, EngineAI debuted Ultimate Robot Knock-out Legend (URKL), a professional humanoid robot freestyle combat league, that offered a prize money pool of approximately 1.4 million dollars. All participating teams are issued a 1.73 metre tall "full-sized" T800 humanoid robot for use throughout the competition. Compared to the G1, the T800 is capable of more advanced combat movements, including aerial spinning kicks, and reportedly had a peak joint torque of 450 Nm. The scoring system for URKL matches differed from traditional human combat sports in that it doesn't simply determine the winner after a knockout but rather through a broader evaluation that assessed the robots on a number of criteria including their motion control, balance algorithms, perception decision-making, power systems, and structural durability. Previously in 2025, Yao Aiwen, EngineAI's co-founder, had commented that the goal was not merely to train tougher tougher robots but the priority was on developing more capable ones and that if robots get better at reacting, moving and adjusting under pressure, the more likely they be ready to be useful in places beyond a fight ring, such as factories, hospitals and even in domestic households.

== See also ==
- CTF 2187
- National Havoc Robot League
- BattleBots
- Robotica (TV series)
- RoboGames
- RoboMaster
- "I, (Annoyed Grunt)-bot" – episode of The Simpsons featuring robot combat.
- Model Warship Combat – robotic model warship engage in model combat using pneumatic cannons
- Robot Arena 2 – Notable robot combat video game
- Roborace
- Soccer robot
- Robot-sumo
