= Typhoon 2 =

TV show character

Typhoon 2 was a robot in the UK television series Robot Wars, noteworthy for being the final champion of the show before it was cancelled. It was a full-body spinner with cutting claws. In two battles in series 7, in which it competed, it knocked out the arena wall, causing the match to restart. It was created by the 870 Dreghorn Squadron's Air Cadets from the Air Training Corps and was painted to resemble the RAF crest. It was named after the Eurofighter Typhoon. The team also had a three-time middleweight champion called Typhoon, a lightweight called Typhoon Thunder (Champion of Robot Wars: Extreme II) which also made Typhoon Twins with Typhoon Lightning, and a featherweight called Typhoon Cadet. Gary Cairns, the team captain, later ran a three-dimensional printing business and fought in the 2016 Robot Wars with PP3D, which reached the second round group stage in its heat. Then, it lost, ironically, to Storm 2 in the decisive battle, before losing at the same stage a year later due to control problems in its battles.

== Robot Wars Extreme 2 ==
=== Annihilator ===
Typhoon 2's first appearance on Robot Wars was in the annihilator from Extreme series 2, in which six robots enter the arena and one is eliminated in every round. The other five robots were Kan-Opener, Thermidor II, Major Tom, Revenge of Trouble & Strife and Raging Reality. Typhoon 2 was eliminated in the first round when eventual champion, Kan-Opener, stopped it from spinning which allowed Raging Reality to flip it and leave it immobilized.

== Series 7 ==
=== Round 1 vs. Colossus vs. Bigger Brother vs. U.R.O. ===
Typhoon 2's spinning weapon never really got going in this battle and Bigger Brother was left to do most of the attacking. Bigger Brother immobilized all three of its opponents but Colossus (Flipped) and U.R.O. (Immobilized by Sgt Bash) were counted out first which meant that Typhoon 2 survived and went through to round 2.

=== Round 2 vs. Hammerhead 2 ===
Once Typhoon 2's spinning weapon had reached full speed it charged at Hammerhead 2 and after two attempts it damaged its opponent internally causing all movement to become reduced to rotating in a circle. Two more hits rendered Hammerhead 2 completely immobilised.

=== Round 3 vs. Iron Awe 2.1 ===
Once again, Typhoon 2 reached full spinning speed and attacked Iron Awe 2.1 repeatedly causing major damage to its opponent, making it spin wildly, breaking its flipper and eventually making it unable to move and was immobilised. Typhoon 2 moved on to the series semi-finals.

=== Round 4 vs. Thermidor II ===
Typhoon 2 employed its usual tactic of avoiding its opponent to get its spinning weapon up to full speed and eventually attacked Thermidor II. One hit was all it took as the impact conked Thermidor II out on first contact.

=== Round 5 vs. Atomic ===
Before Typhoon 2 was able to get its weapon up to speed, Atomic spotted the danger and attempted to flip it, but Typhoon 2 did not turn over. Atomic tried once more to flip Typhoon 2 but it hit the arena grinder instead and flipped itself onto its back, unable to self-right. Typhoon 2 charged up its weapon and attacked Atomic three times causing major damage before Atomic was eventually counted out. Typhoon advanced to Round 6.

=== Round 6 vs. X-Terminator ===
Typhoon 2 charged its weapon up to full power before twice attacking the front of X-Terminator, causing its opponent's disc weapon to stop spinning. Typhoon 2 continued to attack and caused massive damage to X-Terminator before spinning into the arena wall and shattering it. The fight was stopped while the arena wall was fixed and resumed with Typhoon 2 being allowed to charge its weapon to full speed before the battle restarted. After the restart, Typhoon 2 hit X-Terminator once more and finally immobilised it. Typhoon 2 progressed to the final battle.

=== Final vs. Storm II ===
Typhoon 2 attempted to get its weapon up-to-speed and attacked Storm II, but it just glanced off the side and Storm II sustained no damage. Typhoon 2 again tried to charge up its weapon but Storm II gave chase and twice got underneath and tilted Typhoon 2, but were unable to flip it onto its side. Typhoon 2 charged up its weapon again and spun into the arena wall, damaging it for the second time. The battle restarted with Typhoon 2 again allowed to get their weapon to full speed but Storm II remained the more aggressive and continued to ram into its opponent. However, Typhoon 2 eventually managed to damage the armour of its opponent and Storm II began to lose some of its speed and power. Storm II continued to push Typhoon 2 around the arena but with seconds remaining Storm II sustained significant damage to the front and the decision went to the judges. The judges decided that Storm II won on control and aggression, but Typhoon 2 won on style and damage with damage carrying more weight in the scoring. The decision was therefore awarded to Typhoon 2, which made it the series 7 champion, A Decision that didn't go down well with the audience who Booed at the result.

This decision caused much controversy due to reports of heavy editing, allegations of corruption and a smear campaign against Storm 2 due to it being a full body hammer and a lifter to obey the rules for an active weapon.

=== Third World Championship ===
As champion of series 7, Typhoon 2, was entered into the World Championship event that followed. In the first round it was drawn against Tough As Nails from Holland and RawBot from Sweden. However, technical problems forced the team to withdraw from the championship before they entered the arena. The same batteries used in the heavyweight were also used in the middleweight Typhoon according to the team members of fellow UK competitors Storm 2. Due to the time constraints of the production crew only one machine could run. The team decided to defend the middleweight title for a third year.

Preceded by Tornado	UK Robot Wars; Reigning Champion (Series 7)	Succeeded by Apollo
