= Roadblock (robot) =

Combat robot from Robot Wars

Statistics
- Height: 0.40 m (1.3 ft)
- Width: 1.10 m (3.6 ft)
- Depth: 1.45 m (4.8 ft)
- Weight: 82.5 kg (182 lb)
- Weight class: Heavyweight
- Primary weapon: Wedge
- Secondary weapon(s): Circular saw
- Maximum speed: 5 mph (8.0 km/h)
- Turning circle: 0 m (0 ft)
- Ground clearance: 10 mm (0.39 in)
- Power source: 2 × 12V batteries

Team
- Team members: Chris Kinsey; Hender Blewett; Peter Kinsey
- Location: Bodmin, Cornwall
- Country of origin: United Kingdom
- Statistics from Roadblock's heat appearance on Robot Wars series one.

Roadblock was a combat robot that competed on the British television series Robot Wars. Constructed in 1997 by A-level students from Bodmin Community College, the robot was initially called "Road Rage" but was renamed in response to a request from the programme's producers. Both names were derived from the robot's distinctive construction from metal roadsigns. Roadblock was champion of the first series of Robot Wars and finished in third place for the second series. Although Roadblock was armed with a circular saw weapon, its success was primarily due to its wedge-shaped body—Roadblock could drive underneath opponent robots and invert them, rendering many immobile.

For the third series of Robot Wars, the Roadblock team returned with an extensively modified successor to Roadblock called Beast of Bodmin. This robot was equipped with the same circular saw blade weapon alongside fibre glass armour-plating and a powered lifting tusk to assist with flipping its opponents. It also had two large eyes that could "wink" at the audience. Beast of Bodmin was defeated in the second round of the series semi-finals, and after this the Roadblock team never again appeared on Robot Wars.

== Construction ==
Work on Roadblock began in May 1997, in response to a letter sent to Peter Kinsey, Head of Technology at Bodmin Community College. It contained information on Robot Wars, an American robot combat tournament, and enclosed an application form for a British television series based on the format. A-level student Hender Blewett constructed a contestant robot as a practical project, with assistance from teacher Peter Kinsey and fellow student Chris Kinsey. The build process took approximately three months. Roadblock was originally called "Road Rage", but was renamed upon the producers' request. Roadblock's primary weapon was its wedge-shaped armour, which was almost entirely formed from road signs. A modified electric wheelchair provided drive and a chassis; a strimmer engine was mounted onto the rear of this to power a hardened steel circular saw blade weapon.

== Robot Wars ==
=== Series 1 ===
Roadblock was the first ever contestant robot introduced on Robot Wars, and the first to run the Gauntlet. This preliminary round saw competitors having to negotiate an obstacle course with the goal of reaching an end zone. The robot which took the longest to do so, or which covered the least distance, was eliminated from the competition. Roadblock successfully negotiated the course, reached the end zone, and qualified for the Trial. This round featured a particular challenge which changed each week. For the first heat, the Trial was a sumo wrestling match against a house robot called Shunt. The robot which lasted the least time on a raised podium with Shunt would be eliminated. Roadblock outmanoeuvred Shunt and pushed it off the podium, but not without driving off itself.

Although Roadblock itself had fallen to the floor, it qualified for a one-on-one heat semi-final against fur-covered robot Nemesis. Therein, Roadblock used its circular saw to shred the fur before pushing Nemesis to the side of the arena. Nemesis' speed controller failed, and the battle ended with the house robots attacking Nemesis — including Sergeant Bash setting its fur on fire. In the heat final, Roadblock faced the axe-wielding robot Killertron, which landed an early attack on Roadblock's armour. However, in a subsequent charge it drove up Roadblock's wedge and was grounded. Roadblock took advantage and flipped its opponent upside-down, rendering them immobile.

Victory in its heat meant Roadblock qualified for the series grand final. This six-way battle immediately followed the final heat of the series, and pitted the winners of each respective heat—Roadblock, Recyclopse, Robot the Bruce, Cunning Plan, Bodyhammer and TRACIE—against one another. TRACIE and Cunning Plan were immobilised simultaneously as TRACIE drove up Cunning Plan's wedge and became beached due to its low ground clearance. Recyclopse was next to be eliminated with a broken drive chain, before Robot the Bruce mounted and drove too far up Roadblock's wedge and was tipped onto its side. Roadblock and Bodyhammer were still mobile when time ran out, and the judges declared Roadblock the series winner.

=== Series 2 ===
Returning as reigning champion, Roadblock took part in the seventh heat of Robot Wars series 2. Its armour for this series was upgraded from steel to aluminium, reducing its overall weight to 80.9 kilograms. In the Gauntlet, Roadblock was the first ever contestant robot to tackle the Sentinel obstacle: a swinging robotic arm formed from a modified backhoe digger. Although briefly pinned against the arena wall, Roadblock was able to pass the Sentinel and reach the end zone to qualify for the Trial. This second phase of the heat saw Roadblock knock down 34 barrels in a robotic version of skittles - just sufficient to reach the one-on-one battles. Herein, it pushed an immobile Killerhurtz into the midst of the house robots before victory in the heat final over Onslaught, which failed to move.

The format for the second series of Robot Wars differed from the first in that heat winners did not automatically qualify for the grand final. Instead, they progressed to one of two semi-finals containing six robots, of which four would be eliminated. The semi-finals began with the Gauntlet, and again Roadblock took on the Sentinel. Although it was unable to pass the arm to reach the end zone, it travelled far enough down the course to qualify for the Trial. This round saw the arena transformed into a pinball table, with points awarded for performing various tasks — for instance, hitting the bumper guarded by the house robot Matilda added 50 points to the robot's total. The robot which accumulated the fewest points was eliminated. Roadblock amassed 355 points, easily qualifying for a one-on-one battle against King Buxton to decide which would reach the grand final. The fight was close until an internal fire rendered King Buxton immobilised, after which Roadblock used its tungsten-tipped circular saw to inflict further damage.

In the first round of the grand final, Roadblock faced Cassius; this wedge-shaped robot was armed with a pneumatic lifting ram which enabled it to not only flip other robots but also right itself to its wheels if inverted. Roadblock's lower ground clearance proved decisive in its early attacks, as Cassius became beached on top of Roadblock's wedge. Cassius escaped, but was turned over by Sir Killalot. It righted itself with the lifting ram, before using its weapon to turn Roadblock onto its side, leaving it immobile. Although out of the running for a second successive title, Roadblock pitted Killertron in a play-off battle to claim third place.

=== Series 3 ===
Beast of Bodmin reached the series semi-finals before being defeated by Steg-O-Saw-Us.

From the third series of Robot Wars, the Gauntlet and Trial stages of each heat were dropped, with the main competition formed around head-to-head combat. The Roadblock team participated with a robot called Beast of Bodmin, named after a phantom wild cat purported to range in Cornwall. Beast of Bodmin was constructed from the chassis and weapons system from Roadblock, with new fibre glass armour, an additional lifting tusk, and two large animated eyes. In its first battle its armour was punctured by Crusher, but Beast of Bodmin remained mobile and removed one of Crusher's tracks, leaving its opponent unable to move. Next it faced Onslaught, who drove up Beast of Bodmin's wedge and flipped itself. In the heat final, Invertabrat broke down to give Beast of Bodmin a place in the semi-finals.

In the first round of the semi-final, Beast of Bodmin faced Blade, which was equipped with a rotating lawn mower blade. Beast of Bodmin was able to take advantage of Blade's high ground clearance, levering its wheels off the ground and raising it onto its side with the tusk. In this orientation, Blade was unable to move. It faced Steg-O-Saw-Us for a place in the series final. Beast of Bodmin was comparatively sluggish and, after being repeatedly pushed across the arena by its opponent, Beast of Bodmin broke down whereas Steg-O-Saw-Us went on to finish joint 3rd in the competition. This was the first time that the Roadblock team had failed to reach the series final. After series three, the team did not again appear on Robot Wars.

Awards and achievements
New championship	Robot Wars UK Champion; Series 1	Succeeded by Panic Attack
