= Tornado (robot) =

UK competitive combat robot

Statistics
- Height: 0.25 m (0.82 ft)
- Width: 0.75 m (2.5 ft)
- Depth: 0.90 m (3.0 ft)
- Weight: 100 kg (220 lb)
- Weight class: Heavyweight
- Primary weapon: Spinning disc Spiked scoop Fixed spike Spinning blade (Interchangeable)
- Maximum speed: 10 mph (16 km/h)
- Turning circle: 0 m (0 ft)
- Power source: 3 × 12V batteries

Team
- Team members: Andrew Marchant; Dave Gamble; Bryan Moss
- Location: Huntingdon, Cambridgeshire
- Country of origin: United Kingdom
- Statistics from Tornado's grand final appearance on Robot Wars series six

Tornado was a competitor on the UK TV series Robot Wars, noteworthy as the champion of the sixth series. It was built by Andrew Marchant, Bryan Moss and David Gamble, from Sawtry, near Huntingdon.

== Construction ==
Andrew Marchant had originally planned to build a caterpillar tracked combat robot called Plague in 1999. After relocating to Huntingdon, Cambridgeshire, Marchant met fellow Robot Wars enthusiast Dave Gamble. They formed a team and, inspired by Robot Wars series two semi-finalist King Buxton, revised Marchant's design to employ go-kart wheels in a four-wheel drive formation. This redesigned robot was named Tornado, as Gamble is a storm chaser. Bryan Moss joined the team in late 1999 to provide pneumatics assistance for the robot's weapon system. Work began on Tornado's steel chassis in February 2000 and the first iteration of the robot was completed at the end of July 2000, two days before the qualifying rounds for the fourth series of Robot Wars. The robot's initial design was a red box-shaped chassis covered in 6-millimetre (0.24 in) polycarbonate armour, with drive wheels protruding from the top and bottom of the chassis so that Tornado would remain drivable if inverted. Its primary weapon was a piercing spike propelled by a pneumatic ram which, alongside additional static spikes attached to the chassis, was designed to puncture opponents' armour.

From the fifth series of Robot Wars onwards, the weight limit for heavyweight competitors was increased to 100 kilograms (220 lb). In response, Tornado's chassis was increased in length to 0.85 metres (2.8 ft), and tapered so that Tornado's rear wheels would remain in contact with the ground even if its front end was raised by an opponent. Its weapons system was also revised for series five: the pneumatic spike was replaced with an electrically powered 7-kilogram (15 lb) spinning disc. From Robot Wars series six, Tornado retained the spinning disc but it was now mounted in a removable framework. This allowed it to be interchanged with the weapon best suited for each opponent.

== The robot ==
The robot was a basic box-shaped robot with a red frame and clear polycarbonate armor. The robot only had a pneumatic spike in Series 4, but was given a vertical spinning disc in Series 5. In Series 6, it had interchangeable weaponry - the disc, a wedge, a static spike, and a rectangular frame with horizontal blade (intended for use against Razer).

Rather than its weaponry, however, Tornado mainly relied on its speed and strength to push competitors into the pit or slam them into the arena walls. It featured 24V motors being run at 36V to give it high pushing power - its top speed was only 10 mph, but it had very good acceleration. Tornado was also invertible, allowing it to continue running even when flipped.

According to the team's website, it transpired that Tornado was inspired by King B Powerworks, a robot which competed in series 2 and 3 as King Buxton.

== Series 4 ==
=== Round 1 vs. Kater Killer vs. Gemini ===
Tornado focused on ramming Kater Killer, and also rammed the House Robot Shunt. After being attacked by both Gemini and Tornado, Kater Killer became immobilised. Tornado drove into the pit at the end, but it had already qualified with Gemini.

=== Round 2 vs. Berserk 2 ===
Tornado rammed Berserk 2 into the arena wall repeatedly, until it was immobilised.

=== Round 3 vs. Gemini ===
Tornado was flipped by Gemini, but was hardly affected since it was invertible. It rammed one half of the clusterbot onto an arena spike, immobilising it - the rules stated that if one half of a clusterbot was immobilised, the whole robot would be considered immobilised, so Gemini lost the fight, even though Tornado lost its drive chain at the end. This victory sent Tornado into the semifinals.

=== Round 4 vs. Wheely Big Cheese ===
Tornado rammed Wheely Big Cheese in the wheel, but was also flipped a couple of times. Tornado then pushed Wheely Big Cheese into a CPZ, and one of WBC's wheels broke. However, Tornado started smoking towards the end. The fight went to the judges, who declared Tornado the winner.

=== Round 5 vs. Chaos 2 ===
This battle was fought three times, but only the last one was seen on TV. The first was stopped when the arena was accidentally damaged. In the second, both robots were immobilised at the same time: Chaos 2 by Shunt, Tornado by losing its drive chain. In the third, Chaos 2 successfully flipped Tornado out of the arena, winning the fight. Chaos 2 went on to win Series 4.

Tornado won the award for Best Newcomer in Series 4.

== Robot Wars Extreme 1 ==
This was a series of shows with different events that Tornado participated in.

=== Vengeance ===
This was the opening battle of Extreme - Tornado against Stinger, who had apparently claimed that Tornado was just a boring box on wheels. Tornado won the fight on a judges decision by shoving Stinger around. The 'grudge' was very obviously faked, as it had been fought to entertain viewers when filming was delayed. Tornado slammed and flipped Stinger over and over. Then Killalot grabbed Stinger, and planned to drop out of the arena, but Sir Killalot reversed before it let go. Tornado won the Judges over.

=== Mayhem ===
Tornado competed in a three robot melee with King B Powerworks and The Steel Avenger. After some shoving, it suddenly became immobilised and was out after all its hard work. It was then put on the floor flipper. The Steel Avenger won the melee and went through to a six robot annihilator.

=== All Stars ===
In this 16 robot tournament featuring the most successful robots in Robot Wars, Tornado beat 3 Stegs 2 Heaven on a judges decision in the first round. In the quarter-finals, it beat Pussycat, ramming it around so much it caused one of Pussycat's wheels to fall off. In the semifinals, it rammed Chaos 2 around the arena - despite getting flipped against the wall at one point, it won the judges decision. In the final against Razer, Tornado was quickly clawed by Razer, and was eventually immobilised by the damage it sustained - Razer won the All Stars Tournament.

=== Challenge Belt ===
Tornado challenged the original holder of the Challenge Belt, Behemoth - proving the more powerful and maneuverable machine, it won a judges decision, and took the Challenge Belt for itself. Tornado then beat two challengers, Comengetorix and Wild Thing. With three victories, it was allowed to keep the first Belt forever, and so was given another one to fight for. It then beat two more challengers, Chaos 2 and Pussycat, and as there were no more challengers they were given the second belt without beating a third opponent.

=== Second World championship ===
Tornado represented England in the Second World Championship. In the first round, it was in a melee with Philliper (Belgium), Panzer Mk2 (USA) and Yeborobo (South Africa). Yeborobo never moved, and Tornado was flipped about by Panzer Mk2, but then Philliper flipped Panzer Mk2, who was unable to right itself. Being more dominant over Philliper, Tornado won the judges decision and went into the next round, where it met the reigning world champion Razer. Razer beat Tornado again, clawing it and lowering it into the pit. Simon Scott quoted on the Razer DVD "that his heart nearly came out in that battle"! Razer went on to win the final against DrillZilla, and retain its title as World Champion.

== Series 5 ==
In Series 5 Tornado had a small spinning drum (since the weight limit was increased from 80 kg to 100 kg).

=== Round 1 vs. Gravedigger ===
Both robots quickly on to the attack, with Gravedigger landing a couple of hits with its axe. But Tornado soon took control, and the ramming against the wall was too much for Gravedigger, who became immobilised.

=== Round 2 vs. Diotoir ===
Tornado shoved Diotoir around the arena for some time, but then Diotoir started shoving back, and successfully pushed Tornado into the pit. Diotoir then lost the heat final against Spawn Again who went on to the Series Semi-finals, only to lose to the eventual champion Razer.

== Series 6 ==
=== Round 1 vs. Edge Hog vs. Terror Bull vs. Inshredable ===
This fight started off with Tornado giving out some powerful slams - it pushed Inshredable around the arena a bit, then combined with Edgehog to push Inshredable into Matilda's CPZ. Edgehog became immobile soon afterward. Tornado continued shoving Inshredable around, then shoved Terror Bull into the pit - Tornado and Inshredable qualified. Inshreadable was in no shape to fight again, as proved in its fight against Anarchy.

=== Round 2 vs. Thor ===
Tornado pushed Thor around the arena and into the House Robots, causing one of Thor's side panels to come off. Tornado won on a judges' decision.

=== Round 3 vs. Anarchy ===
Tornado replaced their spinning disc with a static spike for this battle. They pushed the walker Anarchy around, but were also flipped a few times. Tornado again won the judges' decision, and was through to the semifinals.

=== Round 4 vs. Hypno-Disc ===
Tornado fitted a low wedge for this battle. They simply shoved Hypnodisc around, leaving Hypnodisc unable to get its spinning disc up to speed and use it effectively. Tornado won the judges' decision.

=== Round 5 vs. Dominator 2 ===
Tornado slammed Dominator 2 twice with its scoop, Dominator 2 axed it and made a nice hole though. However, Tornado pushed Dominator 2 into the side of Matilda in a CPZ, but Matilda couldn't turn her flywheel into Dominator 2, and Tornado backed straight into Matilda's flywheel, and went soaring above the pit and landed at the side of it, where it ran away, but Dominator 2 tried to chase it, but did a backwards-nose-dive into the pit. Tornado had made it to the Grand final for the very first time.

=== Round 6 vs. Firestorm 4 ===
Tornado pushed Firestorm around the arena for a bit. Firestorm was having trouble getting under Tornado because their scoop was so low to the ground. Eventually they pushed Tornado into Shunt and Tornado got axed by the House Robot. Firestorm wedged Tornado into the wall. Tornado's wheels started smoking as they then pushed Firestorm back. Firestorm then got under Tornado again and pushed them around for a bit. Tornado was beginning to falter as they pressed the Pit Button. Tornado then got under Firestorm and slammed them into Shunt. After axing Firestorm, Shunt axed Tornado, nearly hitting the receiver. Firestorm flipped Tornado over. Tornado's scoop was now upside down and ineffective, until Firestorm flipped them again. Tornado then got under Firestorm and slammed them into the Pit Button. Just before time ran, Tornado pushed Firestorm down the pit, qualifying for the grand final.

=== Round 7 vs. Razer ===
For the battle against Razer, Tornado was fitted with a large metal frame with a lawnmower blade attached. Created specially for this fight, should it have occurred, this frame made it impossible for Razer to reach the inner parts of Tornado.

The round begun with Tornado ramming Razer several times, although rather ineffectively. Tornado's lawnmower blade stopped spinning at one point. Razer was able to grab onto the cage, but to no avail, as its moving power was outmatched by Tornado's.

Razer was slammed and became stuck behind the disc button, and Tornado rammed it many more times. Refbot eventually freed Razer. Tornado pushed Razer to the CPZ's of both Dead Metal and Shunt. The pit button was pushed and Razer managed to get a grip on Tornado's cage, lift it up and drag it into the pit, but Tornado's frame was too big for it to even fit all the way. Cease was called.

After a 45-minute wait, the judges finally ruled in favour of Tornado because Razer did not release itself from the robot upon its placement on the pit. Therefore it was deemed that Tornado did nothing wrong and subsequently became the new UK Champion.

== Robot Wars Extreme 2 ==
=== All Stars ===
In the first round, Tornado was in a three-robot melee with Dantomkia and Terrorhurtz. Terrorhurtz was eliminated via pit, allowing Dantomkia and Tornado to qualify. Tornado was then beaten in the second round by Bigger Brother via pit, while Dantomkia lost to the heat winners Firestorm 4, who were beaten by reigning and eventual All Star champions Razer.

=== Challenge Belt ===
Eight robots (Barbarous 2, Dantomkia, Hypno-Disc, Iron Awe 2, Sir Chromalot, SMIDSY, Terrorhurtz and Vader) competed against each other for the right to challenge Tornado for the Challenge Belt, which Tornado had continued to hold since the first series of Extreme. Terrorhurtz won, and went against Tornado. Tornado quickly pitted Terrorhurtz, and was allowed to keep the second Challenge Belt forever.

=== European championship ===
Qualifying as UK champion, Tornado faced the Razer-esque Snake Bite from Switzerland but did not use the anti-crusher frame. After constantly shoving it around the arena, Tornado eventually pitted its foe to face World Champions and arch foe Razer. Although the UK champions did use the spinning blade and framework, Razer now had a new hook extension, specially designed to grapple Tornado's frame and lift it up. The World Champion's tactic worked but, suddenly, their motors burned out in an attempt to pit Tornado and the judges went for Razer.

However, the Razer team conceded defeat as they believed their robot to be immobilised. Tornado therefore faced the Belgian Phillipper 2 in the final, who had taken a lot of damage in their previous fight. Tornado, equipped with their disc, shredded through Philliper 2's armour and eventually pitted it to claim the European title.

== Series 7 ==
=== Round 1 vs. Saw Point 2 vs. Ewe 2 vs. Devastator ===
Tornado pushed Devastator straight into Mr. Psycho in the CPZ, and when it escaped, chased them to the top of the arena, and pushed them towards Matilda. Devastator got stuck in another CPZ with both House Robots whilst Tornado went after Saw Point. Ewe 2 hit the Pit Release button, and after a few attempts, pushed Saw Point in. Then Ewe 2 and Tornado teamed up to push Devastator in on top of Saw Point.

=== Round 2 vs. Leveler 2 ===
Leveler 2 was patched up after the first round, and only really got one flip in on Tornado. Tornado remained in control, and Leveler 2 eventually drove into the pit.

=== Round 3 vs. Tetanus Booster ===
Tornado pushed Tetanus Booster all around the arena, but they put up a good fight, fighting back with their spinning drum weapon, actually breaking the electronic lifter so it couldn't lift, so Tornado could only ram with it. Tornado hit the Pit Release button fairly early on, but Tetanus Booster kept managing to escape the pit at the last moment when Tornado pushed them towards it. Tornado then let the House Robots do the work, and pushed them into Sir Killalot, then chasing them when they escaped into Cassius Chrome. When Tetanus Booster escaped this time, Tornado got in underneath and finally pitted it, qualifying for the semifinals again.

=== Round 4 vs. Raging Knightmare ===
Tornado (with their spinning disc) got underneath Raging Knightmare and slammed them against the wall in the CPZ. Raging Knightmare tried to use the flipper to self-right, but Tornado kept pounding on them until Shunt came in and axed Tornado. Raging Knightmare proceeded to flip Shunt. As Dead Metal came to Shunt's aid, Tornado slammed Raging Knightmare into another CPZ wall and started pounding on them and ramming them hard. Raging Knightmare was stuck upside-down. Tornado pressed the Pit Button and pushed Raging Knightmare down the Pit.

=== Round 5 vs. Gravity ===
Armed with a scoop and spinning chain, Tornado pushed Gravity into the guardrail, and then into Sir Killalot. Tornado then continued pushing Gravity around the arena until Gravity got behind Tornado and flipped them. Gravity chased Tornado, but now both Gravity's tires were flat. Tornado pushed Gravity onto the flame pit. Gravity flipped Tornado again. Tornado recovered and pressed the Pit Button and shoved Gravity into the opening pit. Tornado was into the finals once again.

=== Round 6 vs. Storm 2 ===
Throughout Tornado's opponent's run in the war, Jonathan Pearce described it as "similar in many ways to Tornado, Could even be stronger". Storm 2 proved to be faster and a little more powerful than Tornado. Twice Storm 2 rammed Tornado so hard that it bounced off the arena wall and flew across the floor. Storm 2 got underneath Tornado and used their lifter to flip them upside down, rendering their scoop useless. Tornado lost any real kind of offence with their push from then on. Refbot then hit the Pit Release button, and just as he did, Storm 2 pushed Tornado onto the pit, but they just managed to drive off in time. It went to the judges, who declared Storm 2 the winner. Storm 2 went on to come second place in the grand final against Typhoon 2 on a judge's decision.

=== 3rd Place Playoff vs. X-Terminator ===
X-Terminator was in poor shape before the battle, having sustained major damage in the previous fight against Typhoon 2. Tornado pushed X-Terminator into Matilda in the CPZ, and her disc knocked them onto their front, so their disc, spinning at full speed, carried them across the floor and into the wall. Tornado then pushed X-Terminator into the bottom-right CPZ. X-Terminator's disc clipped Sir Killalot's arm, and the House Robot began leaking fluid onto the floor. X-Terminator was then immobilised in the CPZ, and Tornado hit the Pit Release button, but they couldn't then push X-Terminator towards the pit: the CPZ was soaked with fluid from Killalot, leaving Tornado with wet tyres and little traction. Having won the playoff, Tornado finished third in Series 7.

=== Third World championship ===
Qualifying as European champion, Tornado faced the German Ansgar 3 and fellow UK representatives Storm 2. Both UK robots teamed up to pit Ansgar then Tornado pushed Storm 2 into Dead Metal. Storm 2 escaped and slammed Tornado into the side wall a few times, flipping them upside down in the process. The judges ruled in favour of Storm 2, again who later became the new World Champion.

== Toys ==
In the past, Tornado has had a minibot, pullback, and remote controlled toy. The minibot and RCT had the flywheel and perfect painting. The RCT also had a removable rear panel, where a button is enclosed. If the button is hit twice, the robot is immobilised. It represents the safety link. The pullback had interchangeable Scoop or Disc. Tornado was the only competitor to have an R/C toy based on it. Tornado was going to have a DVD, but was turned down, as was Firestorm, since the series was coming to an end.

Awards and achievements
Preceded by Behemoth	Robot Wars Extreme Challenge Belt; Extreme I–present	Incumbent
Preceded by Razer	Robot Wars UK Champion; Series 6	Succeeded by Typhoon 2
New title	Robot Wars European Champion; Extreme II–present	Incumbent
Preceded by Razer	Robot Wars International Champion; 2nd Championship–present	Incumbent
