= BioHazard =

Combat robot featured in BattleBots

Statistics
- Height: 0.1016 m (0.333 ft)
- Weight class: heavyweight
- Primary weapon: actuated lifting arm

Team
- Team members: Carlo Bertocchini
- Country of origin: United States

Record
- Wins: 32
- Losses: 6

BioHazard is a combat robot built by rocket scientist Carlo Bertocchini. It was the most successful robot in the heavyweight division of BattleBots. It is still considered one of the greatest and most successful combat robots of all time. BioHazard's weapon is an electric four-bar lifting arm (technically, an asymmetric linear actuator) used to lift other robots. The lifting arm has been described as a type of shovel, scoop, or a forklift mechanism. For much of its reign, BioHazard was notorious for being difficult to attack and get under due to hinged titanium wedge skirts on all sides and the low profile affected by its 4.5 inches (11 cm) height. The robot weighs 208 pounds (94 kg) and has a surface area of 3 feet (0.91 m) by 4 feet (1.2 m).

It originally competed in the U.S. Robot Wars where it won two heavyweight division titles. It went on to win four BattleBots championships. Overall, it won three out of four seasons on the television show BattleBots on Comedy Central. Its first significant title was won in 1996. BioHazard returned to competition in the ComBots Cup in 2005. The increased power and development of heavyweight spinner robots prevailed, with BioHazard finishing poorly with one win (a forfeit over Jawbreaker, who was destroyed by Eugene in its first fight) and two losses (one loss to Megabyte in 2:15 by tap out; one forfeit and a final loss to Brutality in 1:21). Paul Ventimiglia, builder of Brutality and later BattleBots champion Bite Force, had given Carlo an extended postponement while Carlo drove BioHazard back to his shop to repair it after its loss to Megabyte. Ventimiglia cited Carlo Bertocchini as the inspiration for his interest in building combat robots. BioHazard was still heavily damaged by the time of their match and has not competed since. It has however, been granted a place in the Combat Robot Hall of Fame as part of the inaugural class and by unanimous selection.
