= Donald Michie =

British artificial intelligence researcher

Donald Michie FRSE FBCS
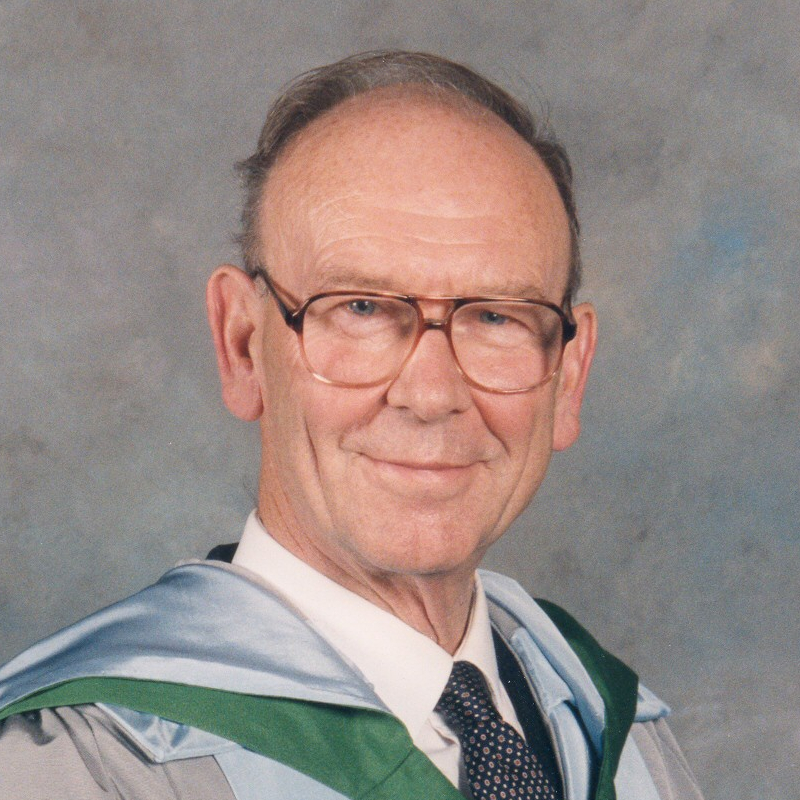
- Michie in 2003
- Born: 11 November 1923; Rangoon, British Burma
- Died: 7 July 2007 (aged 83); North Weald Bassett, England
- Education: Rugby School
- Alma mater: Balliol College, Oxford
- Known for: Lorenz cipher, also known as Tunny; Colossus computer; Matchbox Educable Noughts and Crosses Engine (MENACE); Freddy I and Freddy II; Memoization
- Spouse: Anne McLaren (m. 1952; div. 1959)
- Scientific career
- Fields: Artificial intelligence
- Workplaces: Bletchley Park; University of Edinburgh; Turing Institute
- Doctoral students: Andrew Blake; Stephen Muggleton; Gordon Plotkin; Austin Tate; David H.D. Warren
- Website: www.aiai.ed.ac.uk/~dm

Donald Michie (/ˈmɪki/; 11 November 1923 – 7 July 2007) was a British researcher in artificial intelligence. During World War II, Michie worked for the Government Code and Cypher School at Bletchley Park, contributing to the effort to solve "Tunny", a German teleprinter cipher.

He founded The Turing Institute in Glasgow in 1982, alongside Peter Mowforth and Tim Niblett. In 1984, the institute worked under contract from Radian Corp to develop code for the Space Shuttle auto-lander.

== Early life and education ==
Michie was born in Rangoon, Burma. He attended Rugby School and won a scholarship to study classics at Balliol College, Oxford. In early 1943, however, looking for some way to contribute to the war effort, Michie instead attempted to enrol on a Japanese language course in Bedford for intelligence officers. On arrival, it transpired that he had been misinformed, and instead he trained in cryptography, displaying a natural aptitude for the subject. Six weeks later, he was recruited to Bletchley Park and was assigned to the "Testery", a section which tackled a German teleprinter cipher. During his time at Bletchley Park he worked with Alan Turing, Max Newman and Jack Good. Michie and Good were on the initial staff of the Newmanry.

From 1945 to 1952 he studied at Balliol College, Oxford. He received his Doctor of Philosophy (D Phil) degree for research in mammalian genetics, in 1953.

== Career and research ==
In 1961, he developed the Matchbox Educable Noughts And Crosses Engine (MENACE), one of the first programs capable of learning to play a perfect game of noughts and crosses ('tic-tac-toe'). Since computers were not readily available at this time, Michie implemented his program with about 304 matchboxes, each representing a unique board state. Each matchbox was filled with coloured beads, representing a different move in that board state. The quantity of a colour indicated the "certainty" that playing the corresponding move would lead to a win. The program was trained by playing hundreds of games and updating the quantities of beads in each matchbox depending on the outcome of each game.

Michie was director of the University of Edinburgh's Department of Machine Intelligence and Perception (previously the Experimental Programming Unit) from its establishment in 1965. The machine intelligence unit predated the university's computer science unit. He remained at Edinburgh until 1985.

When he left to found The Turing Institute in Glasgow, alongside Peter Mowforth and Tim Niblett. In 1984, the institute worked under contract from Radian Corp to develop code for the Space Shuttle auto-lander. The code was developed with an inductive rule generator, Rulemaster, using training examples from a NASA simulator. The Turing Institute was involved with a series of advanced robotics projects including robot navigation, robot sensing and using robots to learn the naïve physics of handling objects through random play.

Active in the research community into his eighties, he devoted the last decade of his life to the UK charity The Human Computer Learning Foundation, and worked with Stephen Muggleton, Claude Sammut, Richard Wheeler, and others on natural language systems and theories of intelligence. In 2007 he was completing a series of scientific articles on the Sophie Natural Language System and a book manuscript entitled "Jehovah's Creatures". Michie invented the memoisation technique.

He was founder and Treasurer of the Human-Computer Learning Foundation, a UK registered charity.

=== Awards and honours ===
He was awarded numerous fellowships and honours during his career including:

- Fellow of the Royal Society of Edinburgh (FRSE) (1969)
- Fellow of the British Computer Society (FBCS) (1971)
- Fellow of the Association for the Advancement of Artificial Intelligence (1990)
- Foreign Honorary Member of the American Academy of Arts and Sciences (2001)
- Corresponding Fellow of the Slovenian Academy of Sciences and Arts (2005)

== Personal life and death ==
Michie was married three times. His second marriage was to biologist Anne McLaren from 1952 to 1959. He had four children, one by his first wife, and three by Prof. McLaren, including economist Jonathan Michie and health psychologist Susan Michie. Michie and McLaren remained friends after their divorce and became close again after the death of his third wife. On 7 July 2007 Michie and McLaren were killed in a car crash when their car left the M11 motorway, while travelling from Cambridge to London.

== Legacy ==
The Donald Michie Papers are housed at the British Library. The papers can be accessed through the British Library catalogue.
