= WHRG =

WHRG may refer to:

- WHRG (radio station), radio stations in Virginia, United States
- World Humanoid Robot Games, competition featuring humanoid robots
