= WRO =

WRO may refer to:

- World Robot Olympiad
- Wrocław Airport in Poland (IATA airport code)
- World Regenesis Organization from Dirge of Cerberus: Final Fantasy VII and Final Fantasy VII Advent Children
- Western Rite Orthodoxy
