= Peter Mowforth =

British artificial intelligence researcher, robotics expert and businessman (born 1953)

Peter Heward Mowforth
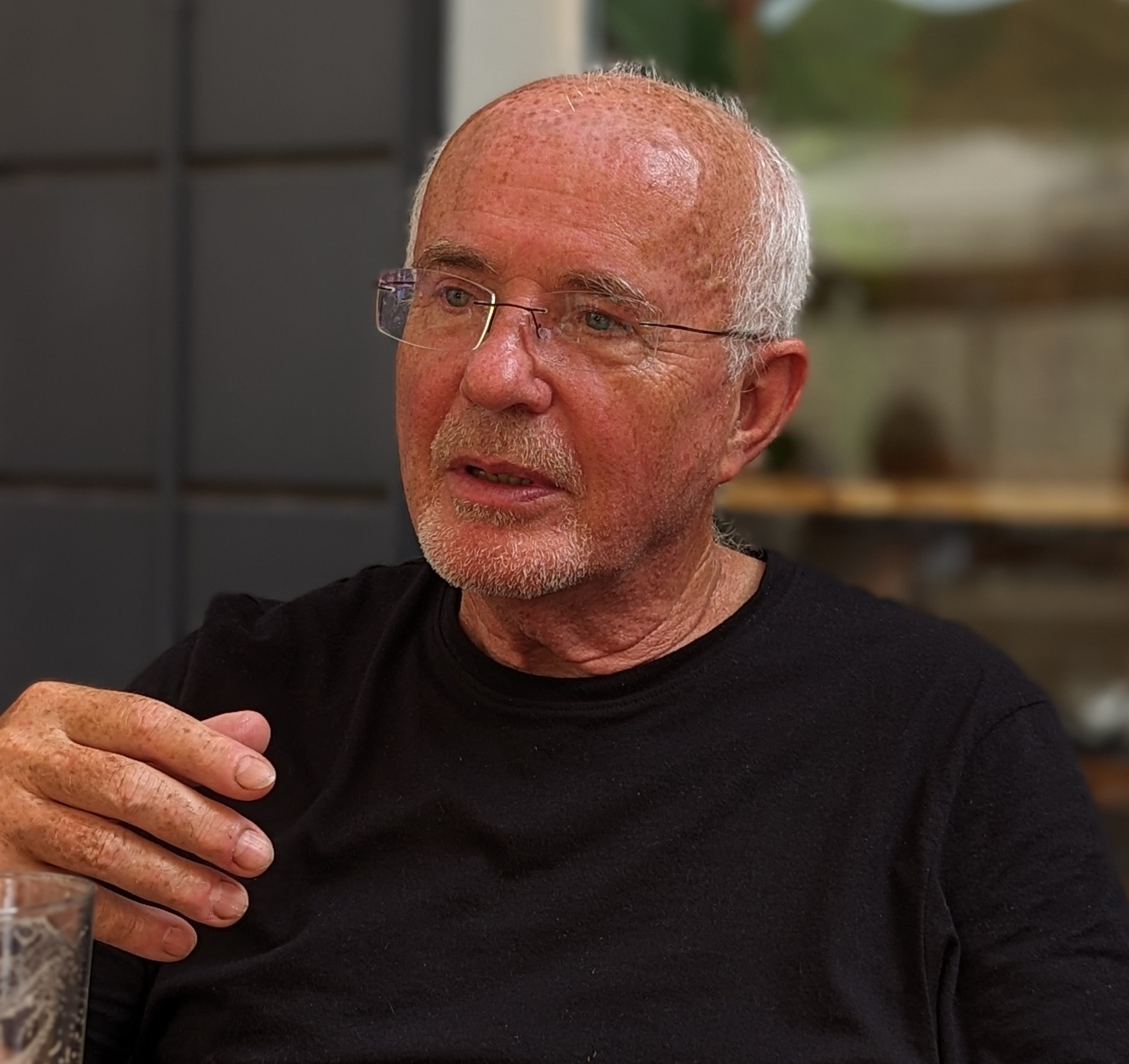
- Mowforth in 2023
- Born: 27 October 1953 (age 72); Sheffield, England
- Education: University of Cambridge University of Sheffield
- Occupation: Businessman
- Known for: Ecommerce, AI, Robotics, Computer Vision
- Title: Director of Research Turing Institute; CEO of INDEZ Ltd
- Spouse: Gillian Mowforth
- Parent(s): Cyril Mowforth, Olga Mowforth

Peter Mowforth (born 27 October 1953) is a British businessman, ecommerce specialist and Chief Executive of INDEZ Ltd, an ecommerce agency based in Scotland. Formerly a Machine Learning, Robotics and Artificial Intelligence research scientist who co-founded the Turing Institute. He set up and ran the First Robot Olympics.

== Early life and education ==
Peter Mowforth was born in Sheffield, England on 27 October 1953. He studied neurophysiology and physics in London. With Royal Society funding he moved to the University of Cambridge to research early visual perception mechanisms with Horace Barlow. Mowforth earned a PhD from the University of Sheffield on the theory and psychophysics of stereo vision.

== Career ==
He joined the University of Edinburgh's Department of Machine Intelligence & Perception in 1982 to study the application of machine learning to robot vision.

Following new funding from the US in response to Japan's Fifth Generation project, Mowforth along with Professor Donald Michie and Tim Niblett, Mowforth jointly founded the Turing Institute named in memory of Alan Turing who had worked alongside Michie at Bletchley Park. The Institute then moved from Edinburgh to Glasgow. It formed a partnership with the University of Strathclyde where Mowforth held an honorary lectureship.

In 1990, Mowforth founded the First Robot Olympics. The event ran from 27 to 28 September, involved teams from 12 different countries in a variety of competitions, had over 2,500 visitors and is features in the Guinness Book of Records.

He was Director of the British Machine Vision Association (1991-1993) where he organised and ran the British Machine Vision Conference in 1991.

After the dissolution of the Turing Institute, Mowforth co-founded INDEZ, in 1995.

Mowforth provides advice to the Scottish Government on matters concerned with ecommerce and trade.

== Research ==
Mowforth's PhD research conceived a Multi-Scale Signal Matching (MSSM) approach to match stereo pairs of images using a Gaussian Pyramid. This approach was then tested using psychophysics to measure the human vergence eye response.

The MSSM software platform for matching images evolved over the next decade where it was used for a variety of commercial applications including 3D stereo reconstruction, GIS, surgical planning for Maxillo-Facial reconstruction, dental archiving, Data Fusion, MRI image labelling and navigation for mobile robotics.

In 1983, Mowforth was part of the machine learning team that worked on the NASA Space Shuttle auto-lander project. The system used a structured version of the ID3 Machine Learning system using training examples created using a numerical model of the shuttle.

At the Turing Institute Mowforth was involved with a series of advanced robotics projects including robot navigation, robot sensing and using robots to learn the naïve physics of handling objects through random play.

== Media appearances ==
In 1990 Mowforth was interviewed by Lorraine Kelly on TV-am about the First Robot Olympics and the future of robotics.

After the death of his parents he shared their letters sent during the Second World War with a local historical association, which led to significant media interest and television appearances, including on The One Show. The letters were adapted into an 8-part podcast series.

He has written about the importance of ecommerce for trade.

== Personal life ==
Mowforth lives in Milngavie, Glasgow.
