= First Robot Olympics =

First international advanced robotics event with multiple competitions

The First Robot Olympics. took place in Glasgow, Scotland on 27–28 September 1990.

The event was run by The Turing Institute at the Sports Centre at the University of Strathclyde. It featured 68 robots from 12 countries and involved over 2,500 visitors over the two-day period.

== Background ==
During the 1990s the Turing Institute had been involved in a wide range of robotics activities and had developed links with many leading robotics laboratories as a result of both student exchange and a series of collaborative research projects.

The event was conceived and directed by Dr Peter Mowforth, director of the Turing Institute, as an events-based meetup for robot enthusiasts and builders. Although there had been single event competitions and national events for competing robots, this was the first time that such a large, varied and international Robot Competition had taken place.

Many of the robots that came to the event reflected key research themes that were present at the time. For example, the two-wheeled balancing 'torch carrying' (pre-Segway) robot that opened the event was associated with the institute's work on using machine learning applied to the inverted pendulum

Strathclyde University was an academic associate of and adjacent to the Turing Institute. The university made their sports hall complex available for the two-day event.

== Events and results ==
EVENT	Gold	Silver	Bronze
Obstacle Avoidance	ASTERIX. University of Toronto, Canada. Anthony Green & Pavel Rozalski	OSCAR. AI Dept. Edinburgh University. Scotland	YAMABICO. Tsukuba University, Japan. Shoji Suzuki
Pole Balancing	PENDULUM. Salford University, England. F Nagy & G A Medrano-Derda	LANKY. Lancaster University, England	MENACE, Turing Institute, Scotland. Bing Zhang
Phototrophic	ALPHA PHOTON. Kent University, England. David Bisset	ICARUS. The Shadow Group, England. David Buckley.	
Manipulators	BELGRADE/USC HAND. University of Belgrade, Yugoslavia	BCI. St Patricks High School, Coatbridge, Scotland.	
Biped Race	CARDIFF BIPED. Uni. Wales, Cardiff, Wales. Paul Channon, Simon Hopkins & Prof Pham	ROBBIE. Paisley College of Technology, Scotland. Ken MacFarlane, Gordon Allan	
Javelin	YORK ARCHER. Museum of Automata, York, England	WILBERFORCE. East London Polytechnic, England. Martin Smith	ELEPHANTS TRUNK. Heriot-Watt University, Edinburgh, Scotland. J B C Davies, J Morrison
Multi-Legged Race	PENELOPE. Edinburgh University, Scotland. D J Todd	GENGHIS. Massachusetts Institute of Technology, AI Lab, US. Olaf Beck, Prof. Rodney Brookes & Colin Angle	
Wall Following	YAMABICO. Tsukuba University, Japan. Shoji Suzuki	SAM. Kent University, England. David Bisset, Jason Garforth, Jeremy Laycock	
Talking	RICHARD 1ST. Turing Institute, Scotland. Ketil Undbekken, Peter Mowforth	SHADOW WALKER. The Shadow Group, London, England. David Buckley	
Wall Climbing	ZIG ZAG. Portsmouth Polytechnic, England. A A Collie, J Billingsley, R P Smith	RVP II. Soviet Academy of Sciences, Moscow, USSR. Professor Chernousko, Professor Gradetsky	RVP I. Soviet Academy of Sciences, Moscow, USSR. Professor Chernousko, Professor Gradetsky
Behaviour	GENGHIS. Massachusetts Institute of Technology, AI Lab, US. Olaf Beck, Prof. Rodney Brookes & Colin Angle	SHEEP & SHEEP DOG. Computer Science, Strathclyde Uni. Scotland	SIAS. City Montessori School, Lucknow, India. Mr Ashish Panwar

=== National medals table ===
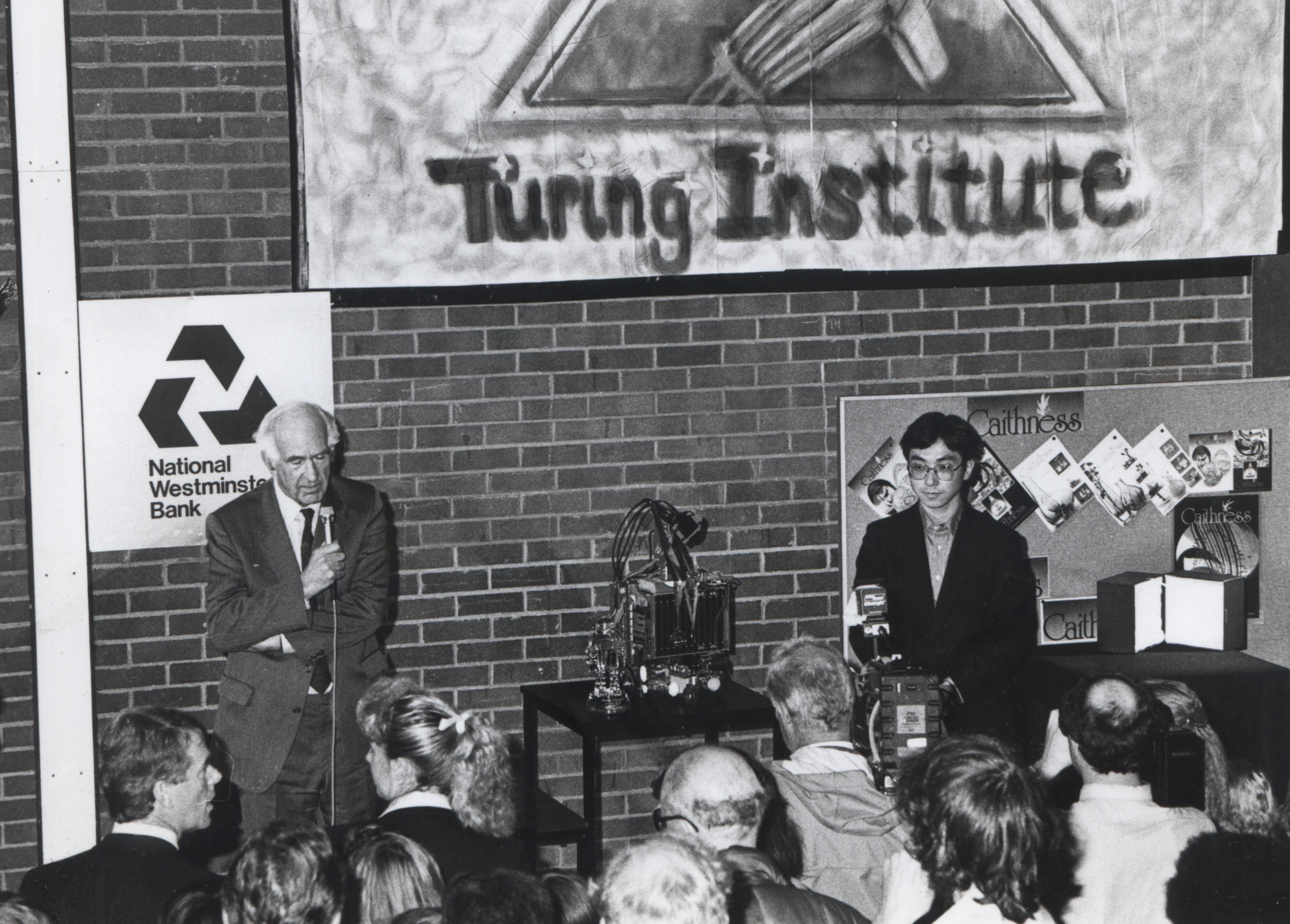
Japan's Yamabico and robot builder Shoji Suzuki from the University of Tsukuba receiving the overall Robot Olympic Champion award from Lord Balfour of Burleigh.

Country	Gold (3 points)	Silver (2 points)	Bronze (1 Point)	Total
England	4	5	0	22
Scotland	2	4	2	16
USA	1	1	0	5
Japan	1	0	1	4
USSR	0	1	1	3
Canada	1	0	0	3
Yugoslavia	1	0	0	3
Wales	1	0	0	3
India	0	0	1	1
Mexico	0	0	0	0

=== Disqualifications ===
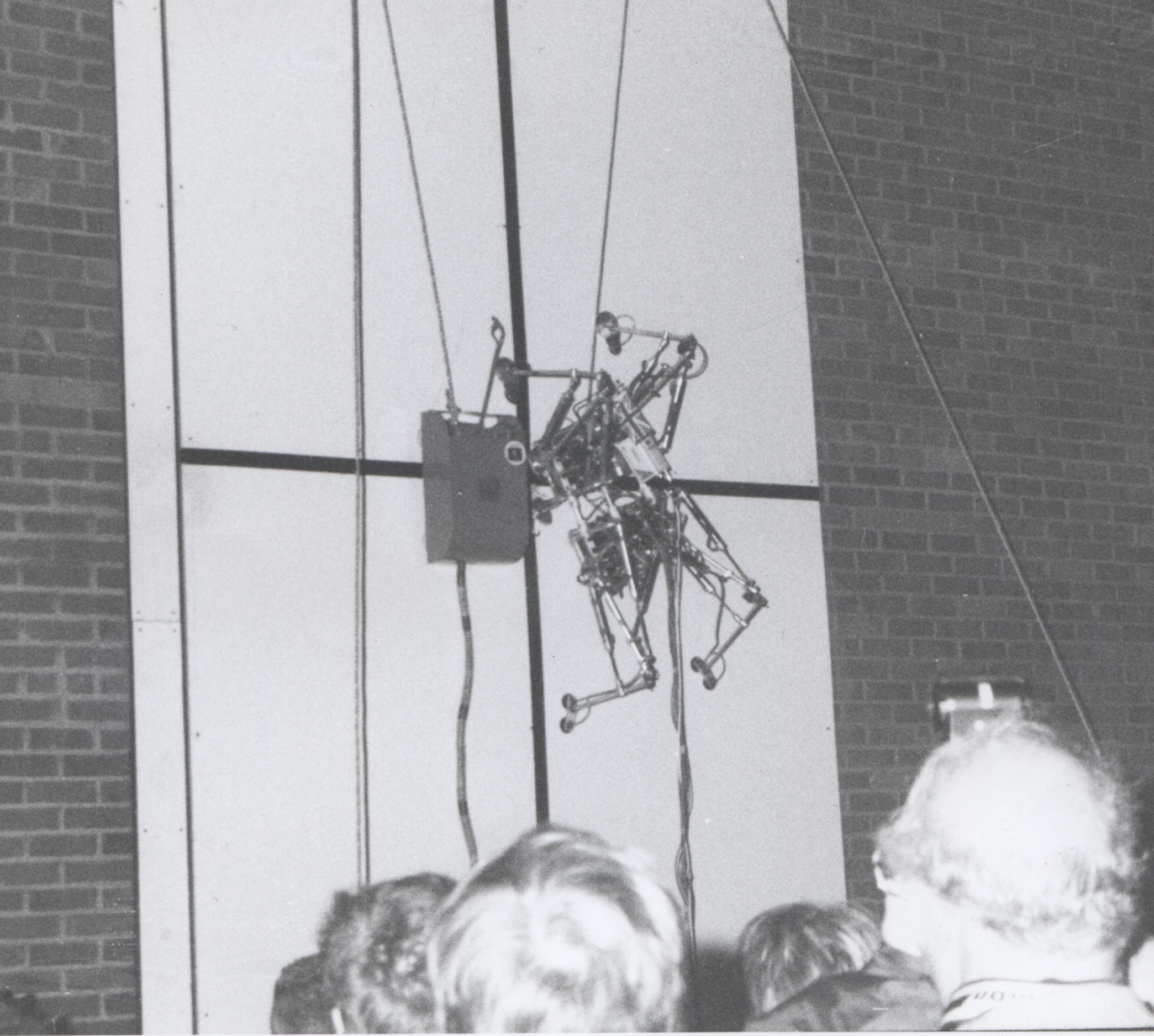
Robug II disqualified for trying to mount Russian competitor during race.

Four judges supervised the events to ensure 'fair play'. They were:

• Professor Frank Nage, University of Salford
• Professor Ruzena Bajcsy, University of Pennsylvania
• Eddie Grant (IEEE Representative, University of Strathclyde)
• Professor Hans P. Moravec, Carnegie Mellon University

Robot	Event	Reason for disqualification
YAMABICO, Japan	Talking	Could not speak English
SIAS, India	Talking	Completely incomprehensible
ROBUG II, England	Wall Climbing	Veering out of lane and demonstrating inappropriate behaviour in front of children.
MEXBOT, Mexico	Multi-Legged Race	Damaged during transportation. Dropped when offloaded from ship in UK.

=== Special awards ===
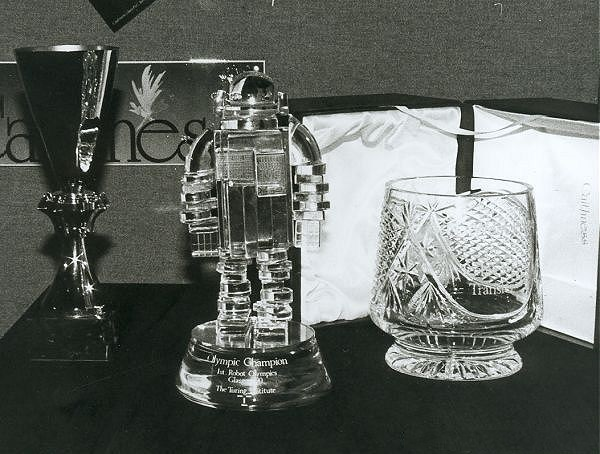
Caithness Glass Champions Award.

Several organisions provided special awards for different categories of competition.

IEEE Robotics & Automation Society Young Roboticist Award Brian Carr (School pupil), St Patricks High School, Coatbridge, Scotland. Awarded £25 book token.

NatWest Bank Prize for Technology Transfer Olaf Beck, Prof. Rodney Brookes & Colin Angle, Massachusetts Institute of Technology MIT, AI Lab, USA Awarded with a Caithness Crystal bowl and £200 from NatWest Bank.

'Turing Institute Best School Prize' XYBOT Inverkeithing School, Class 7S, Scotland. Awarded with a cup and a cheque for £100.

'Olympic Champion' YAMABICO from Tsukuba University, Japan. Prize given to Shoji Suzuki. Awarded with a Caithness Glass Trophy.

== Photographs ==
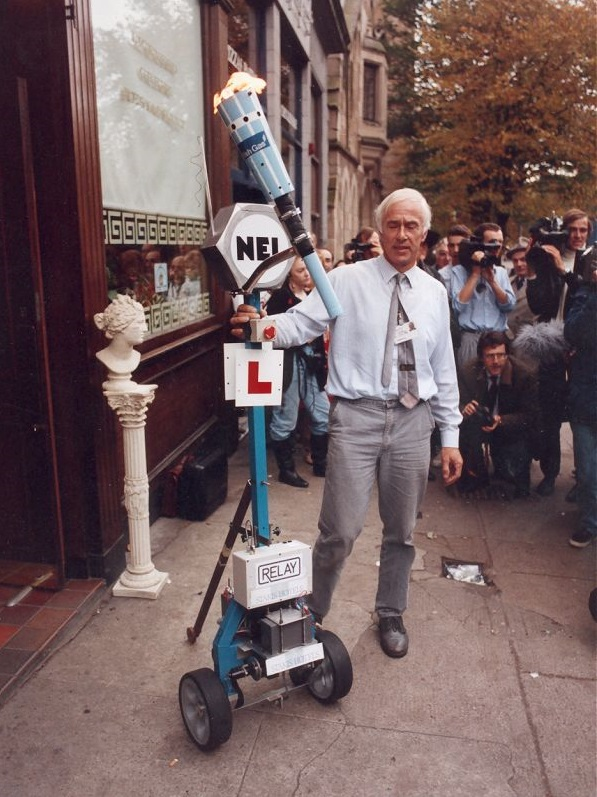
Torchbearer NEL carrying flame to Olympic Venue from Greek Restaurant.

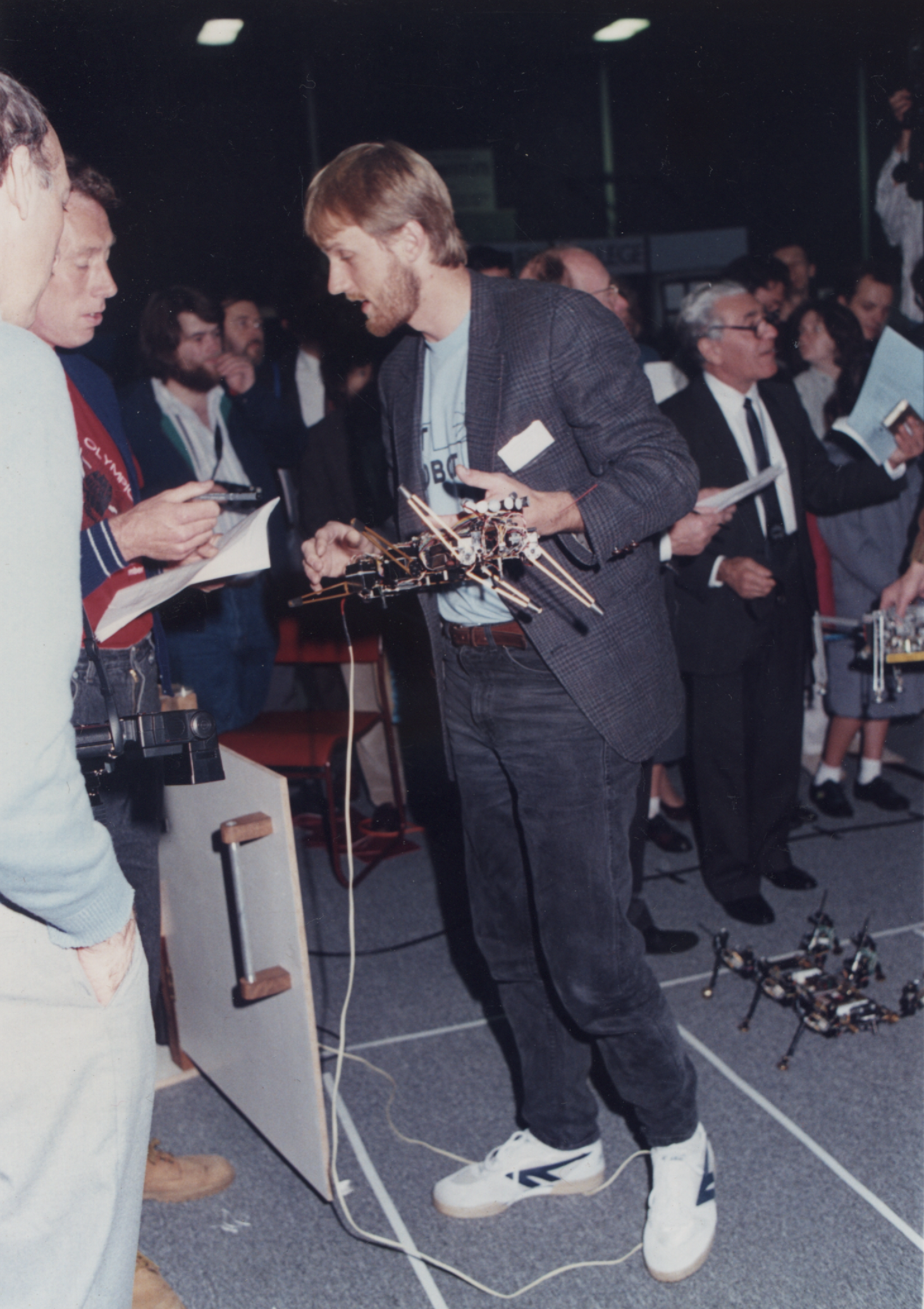
Genghis from MIT. Olaf Beck, Rodney Brookes & Colin Angle.

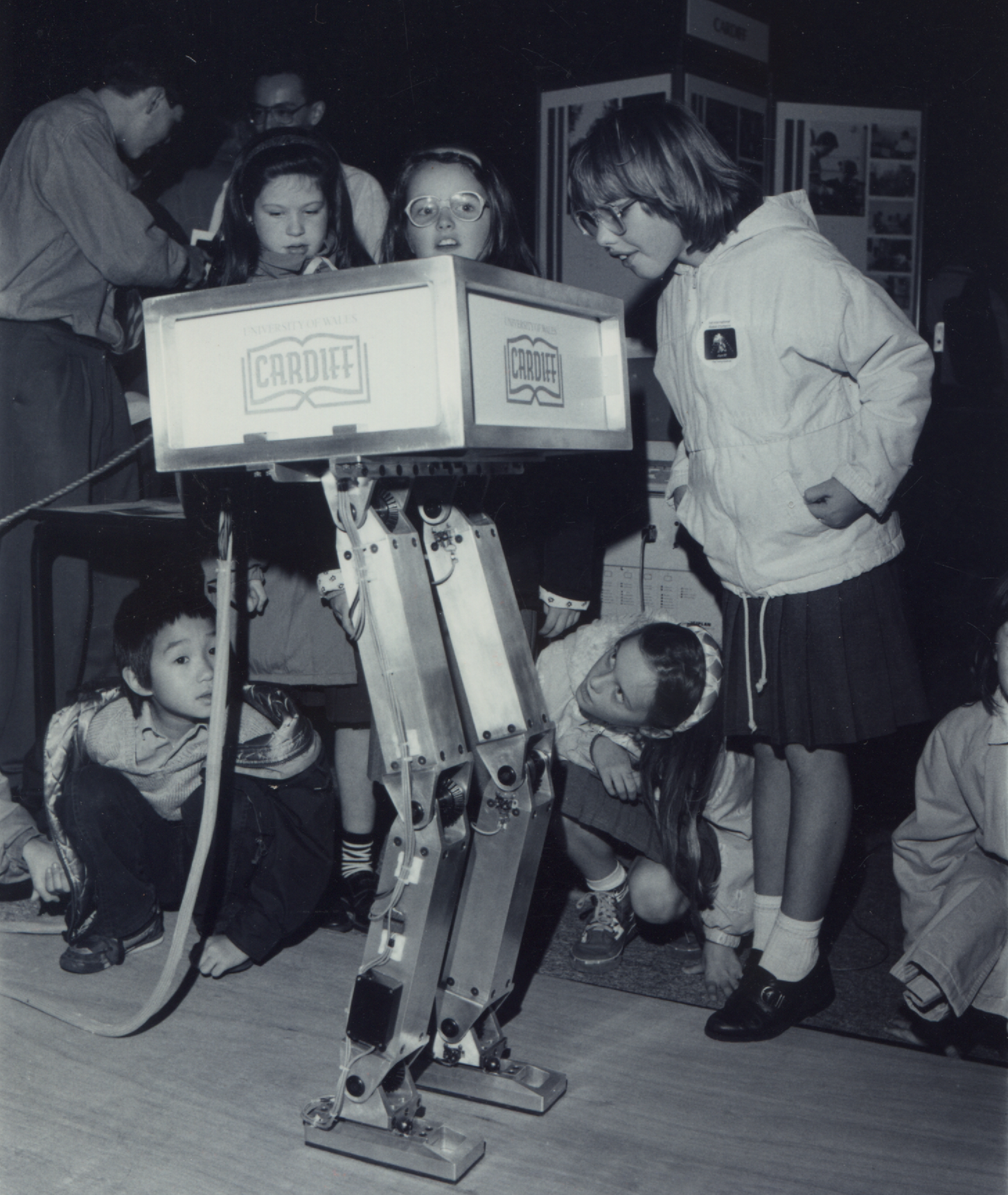
Biped Walker, University of Wales. Paul Channon & Simon Hopkins.

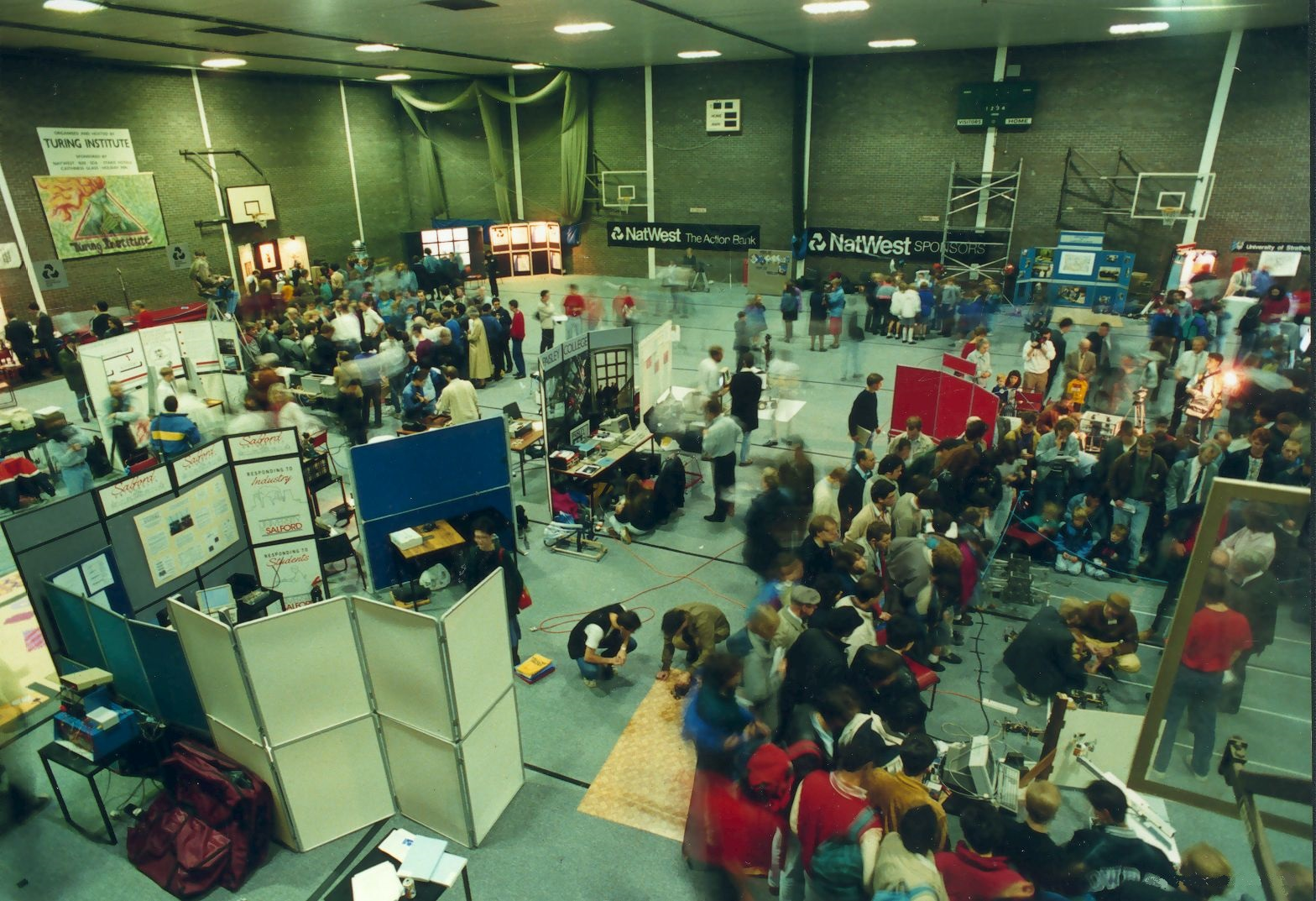
View from inside the Olympics sports hall at Strathclyde University.

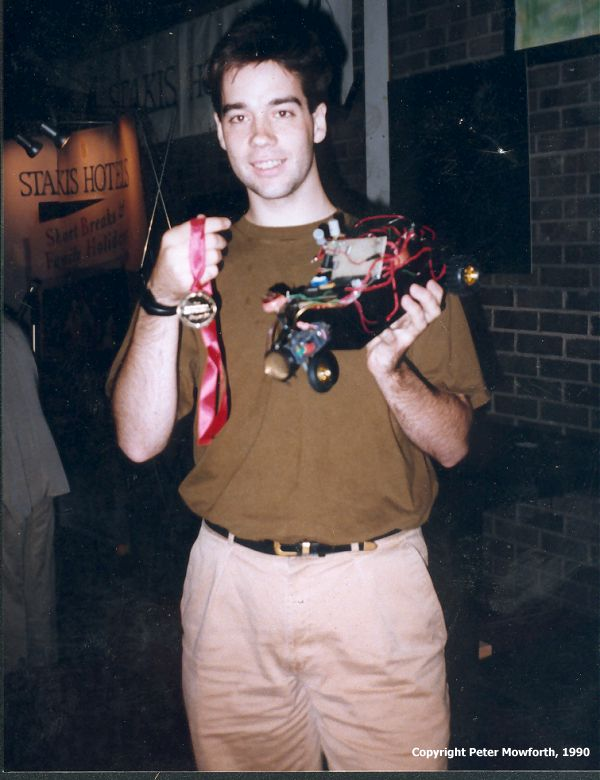
Gold medal winner Anthony Green with Asterix, Toronto Uni.

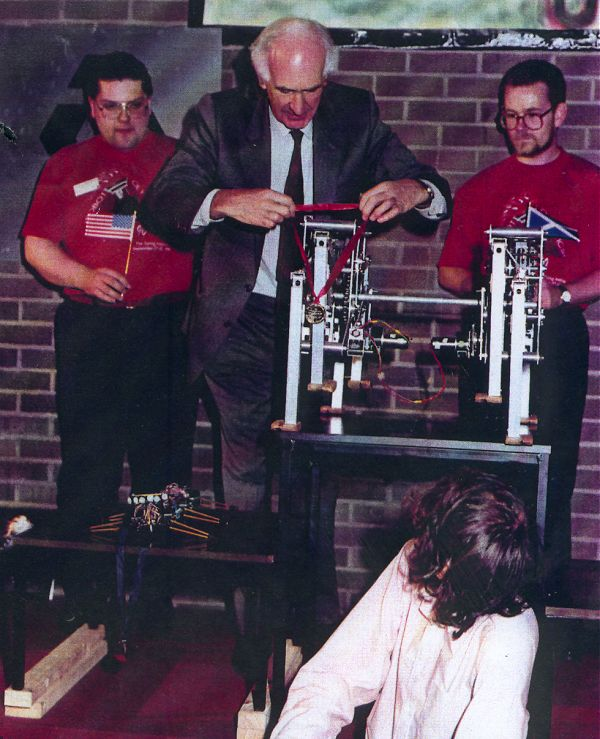
Scotland's Edinburgh University takes Gold in the multi-legged race.

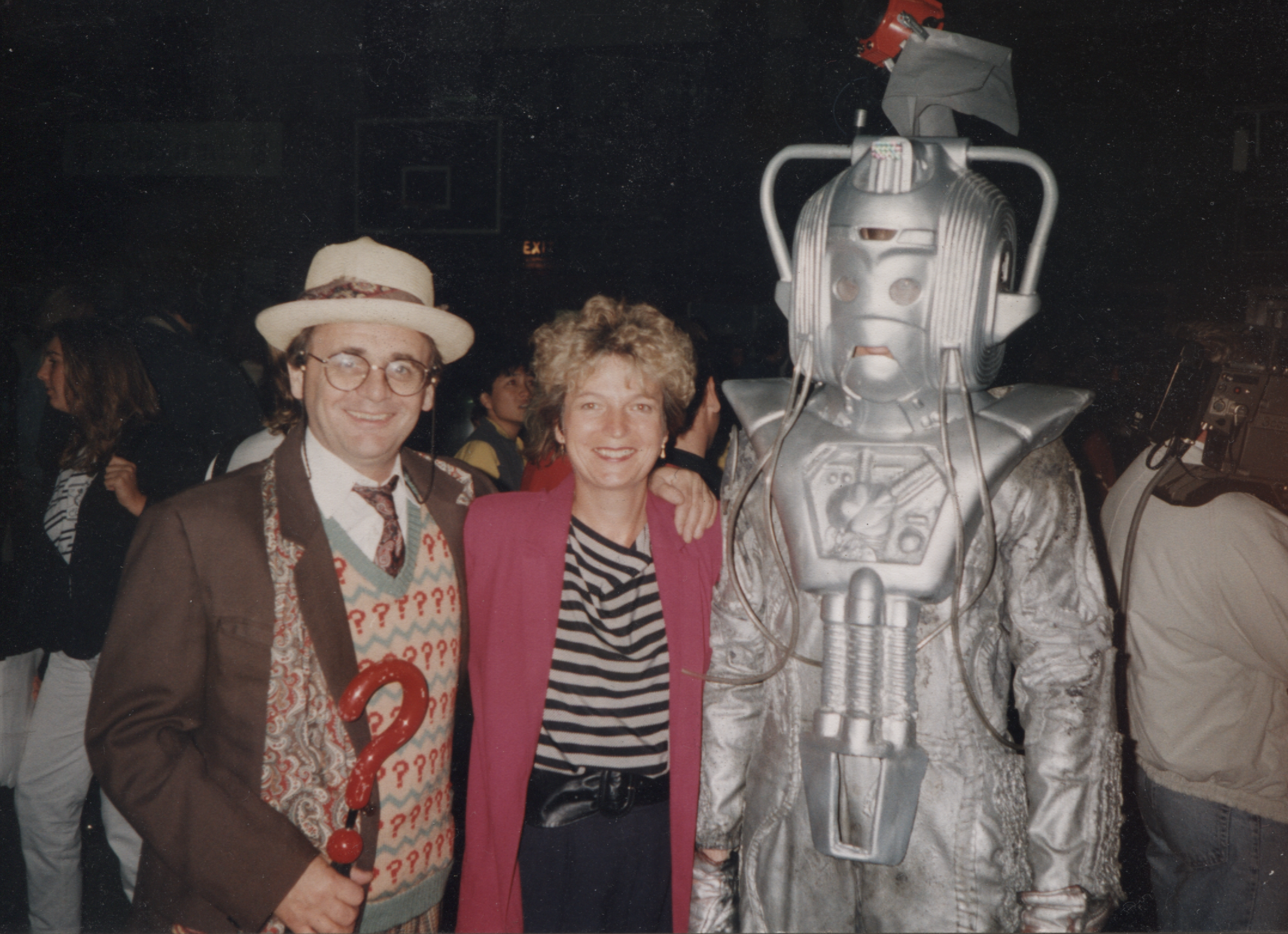
Dr Who (Sylvestor McCoy) opens the event with Sue Mowforth.

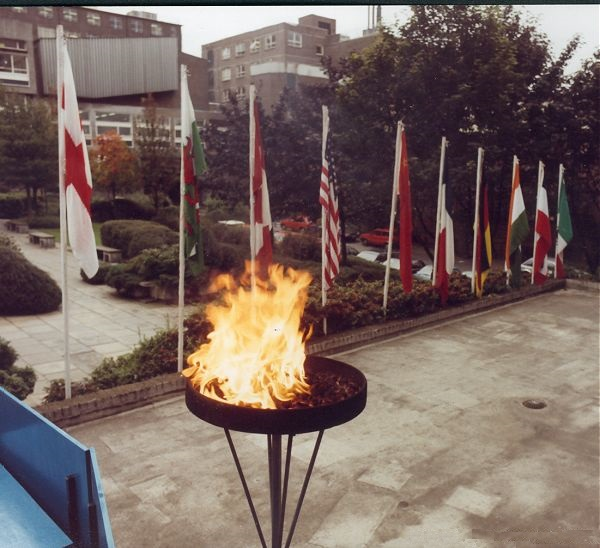
Olympic Flame (British Gas) & flags outside the Robot Olympics venue.

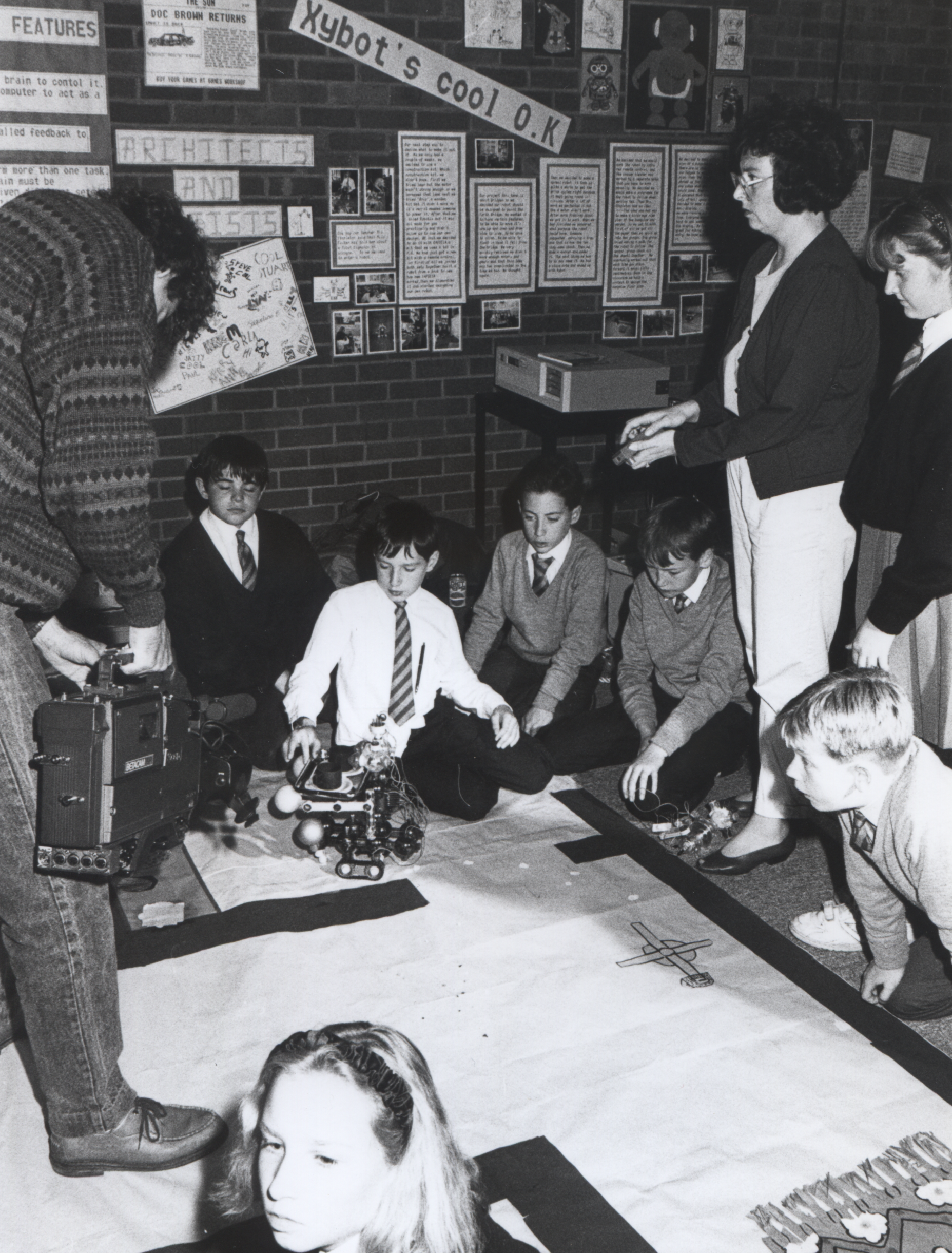
Inverkeithing Primary School win the Turing Institute Schools prize.

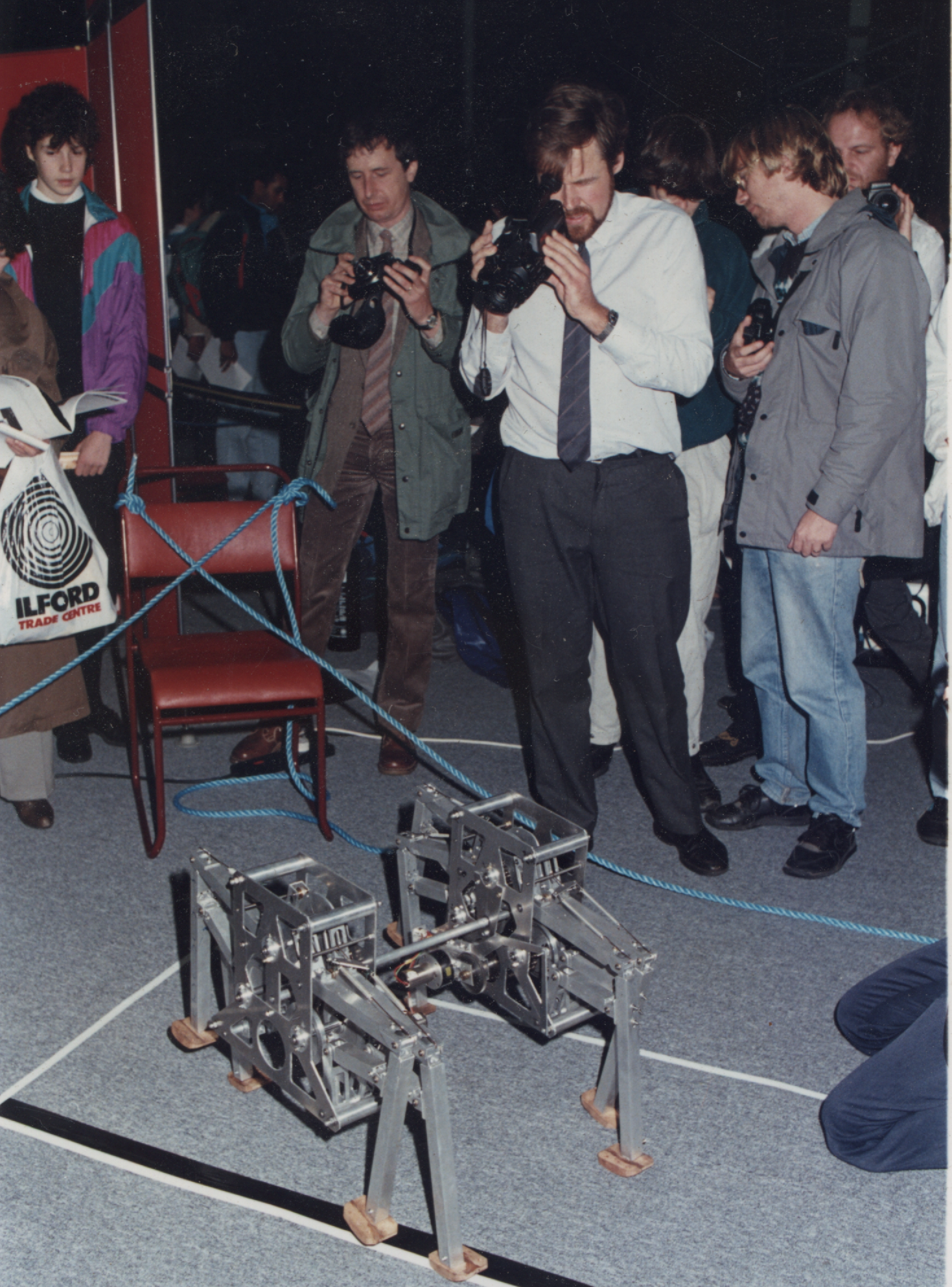
Jack Todd's 'Penelope' eight legged Robot from University of Edinburgh.

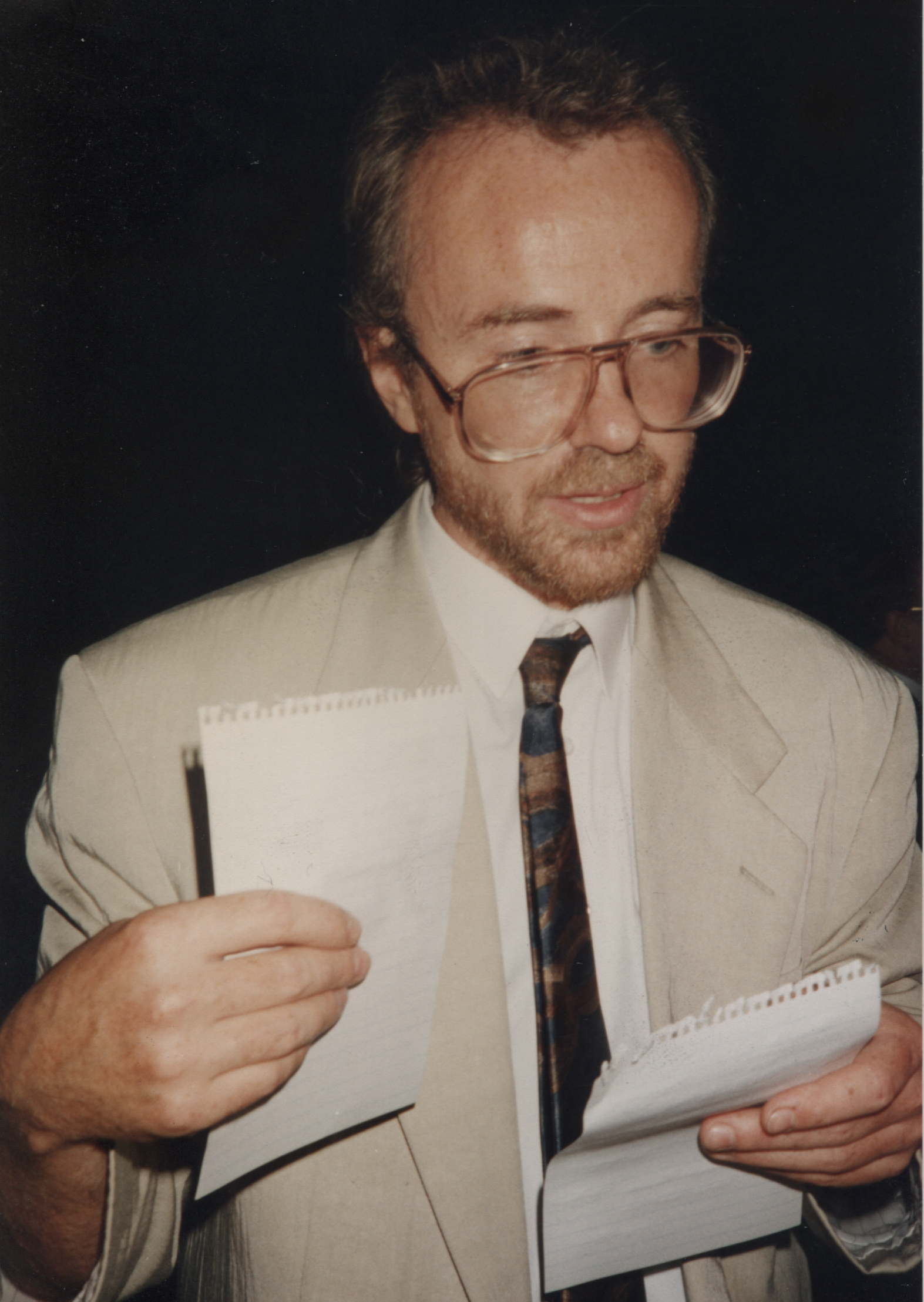
Event organisor Dr Peter Mowforth, Director, The Turing Institute.

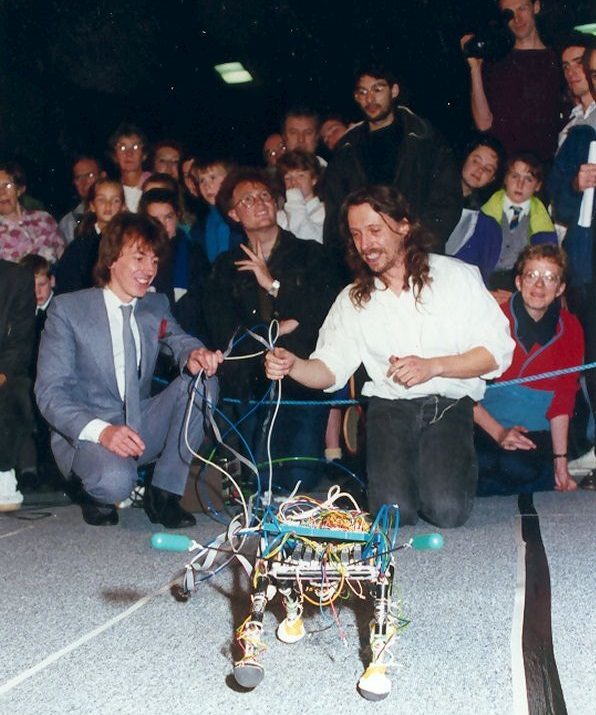
First heat for the Multi-legged race featuring TAG.

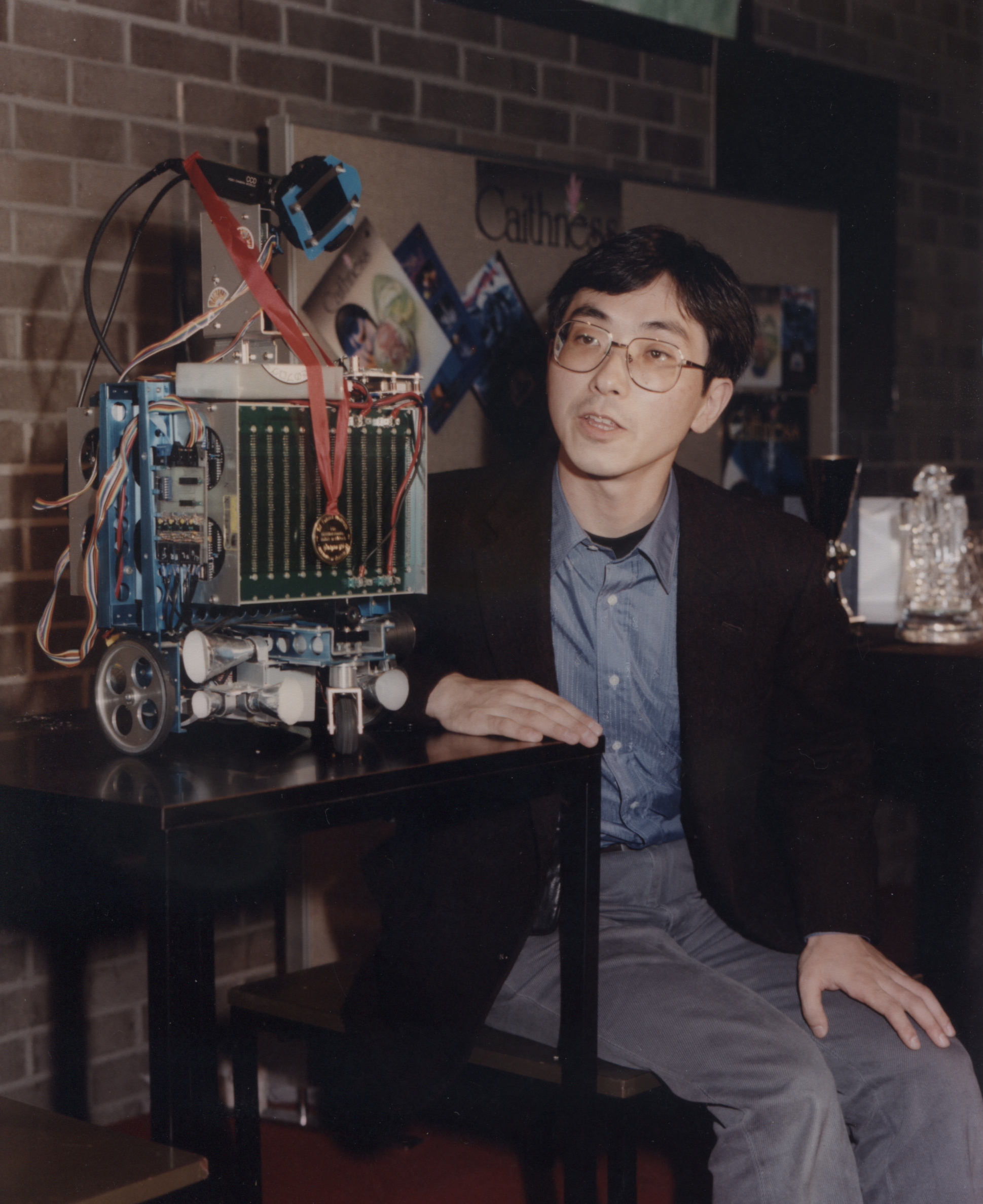
Yamabico from University of Tsukuba with Shoji Suzuki.

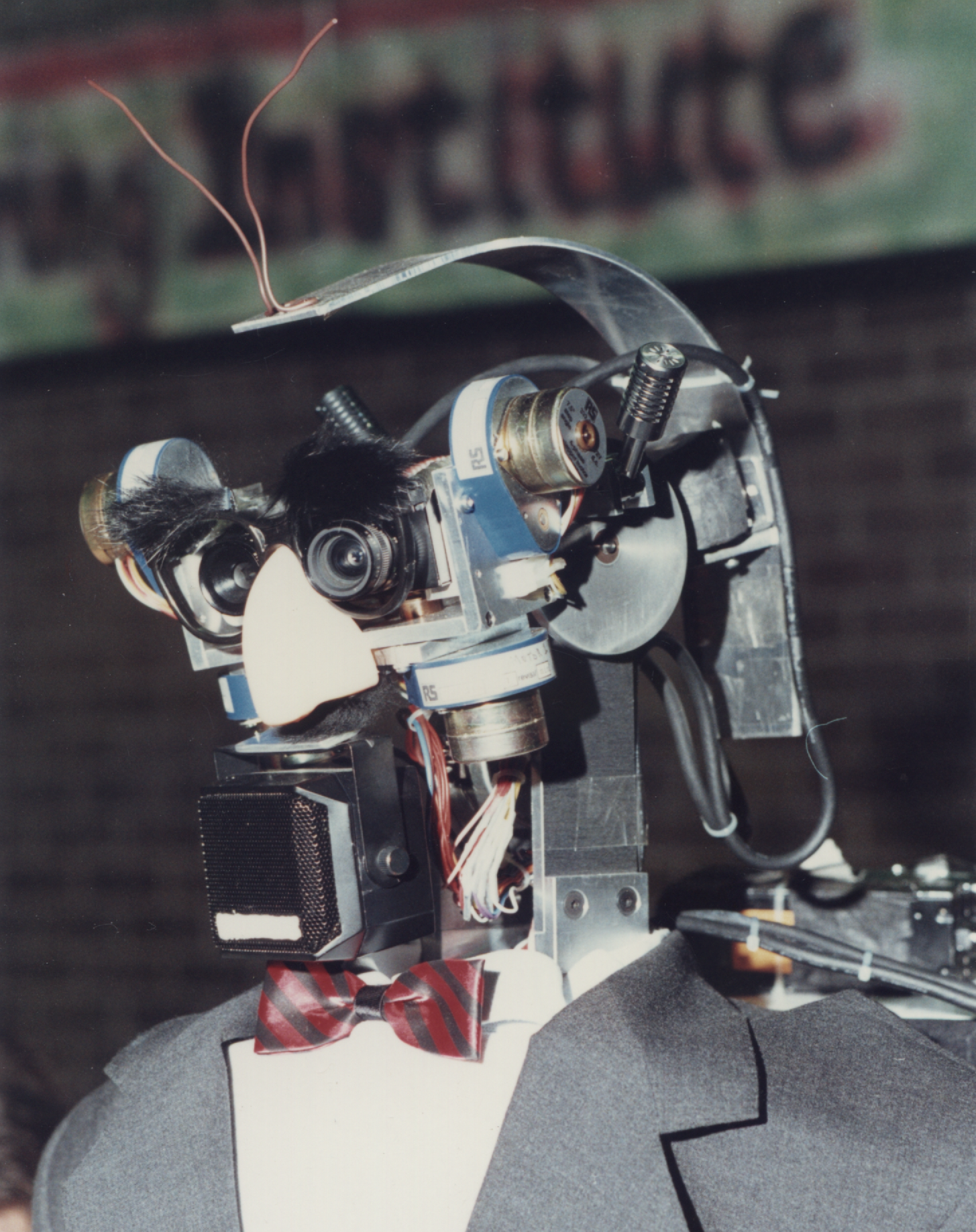
Richard 1st robot head commentator from The Turing Institute, Glasgow.

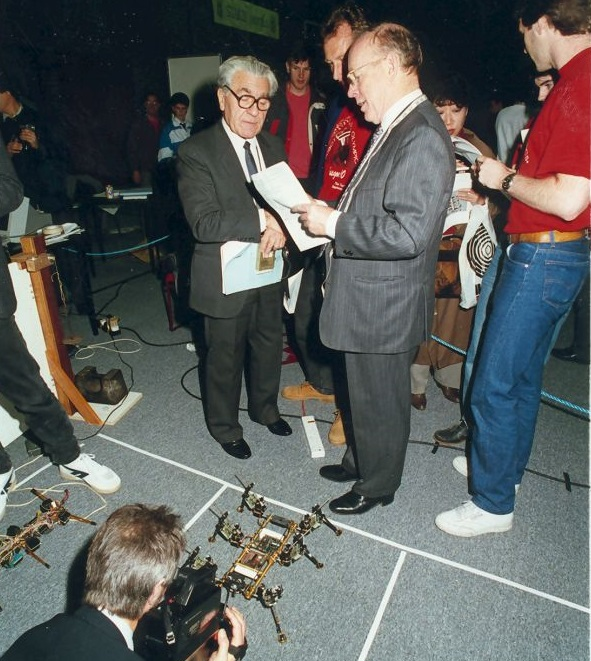
Olympic Judge, Professor Frank Nage discusses Genghis from MIT.

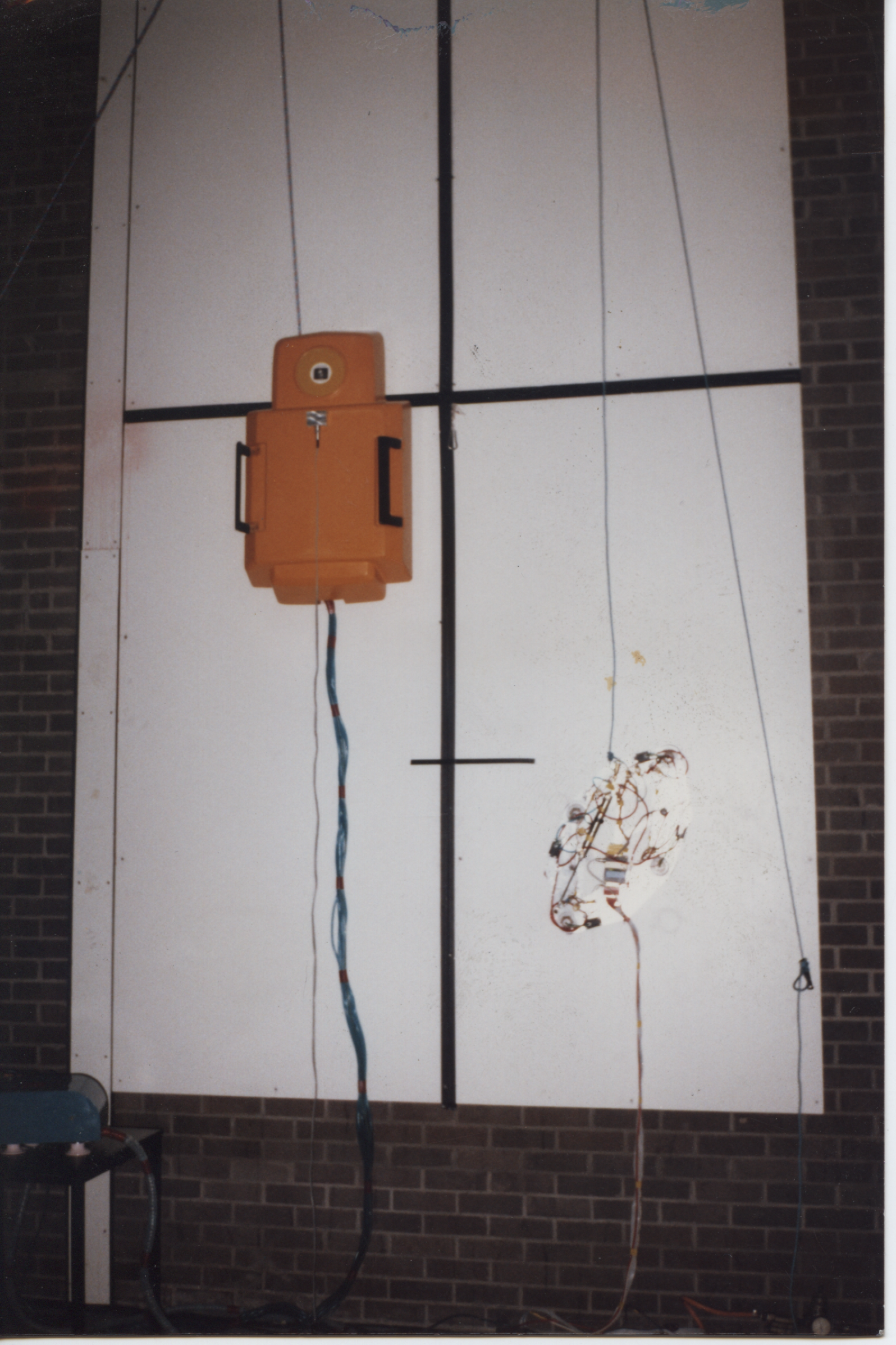
Wall Climbing Heat 2; RVG (Moscow) v ZigZag (Portsmouth).

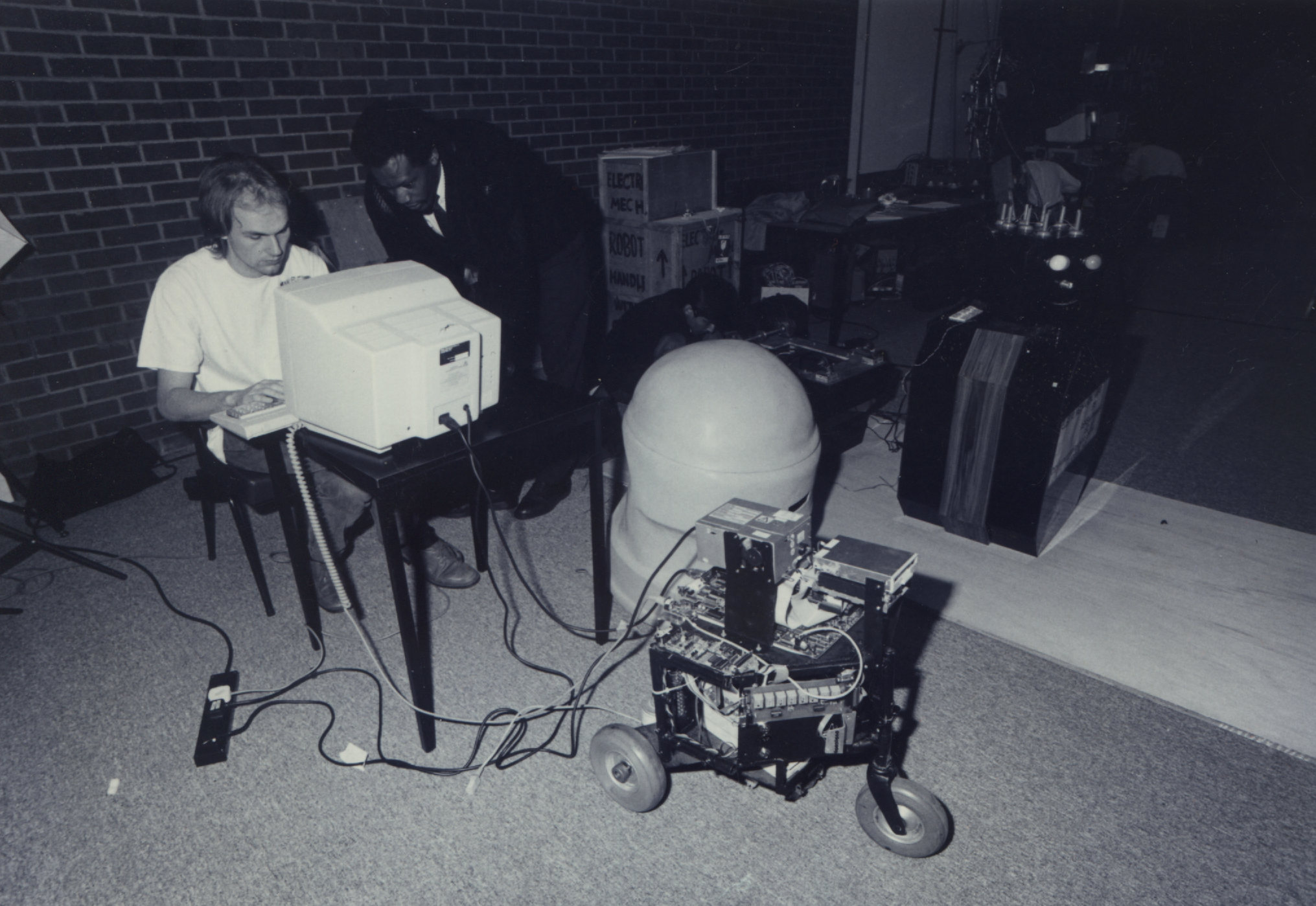
Robot Builders with SIAS (Lucknow, India) in background.

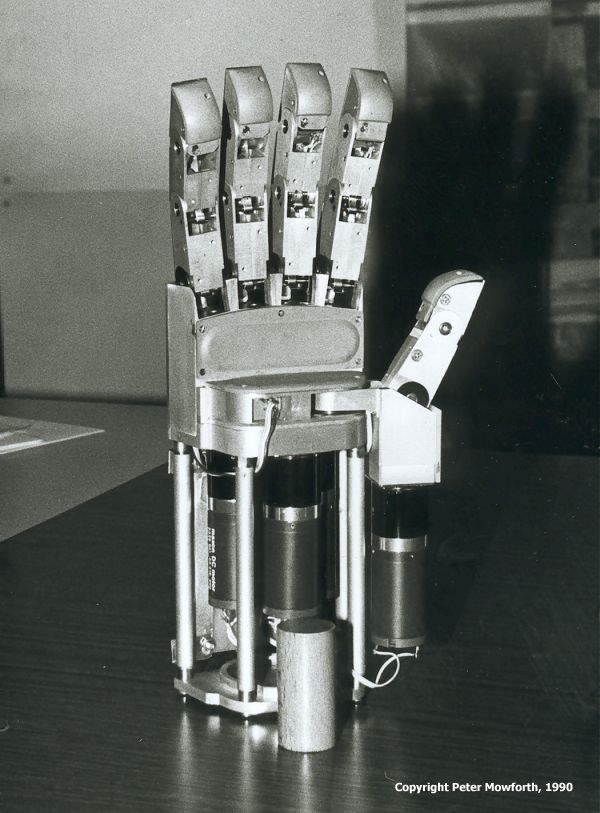
Gold medal winner robotic hand from Belgrade University.

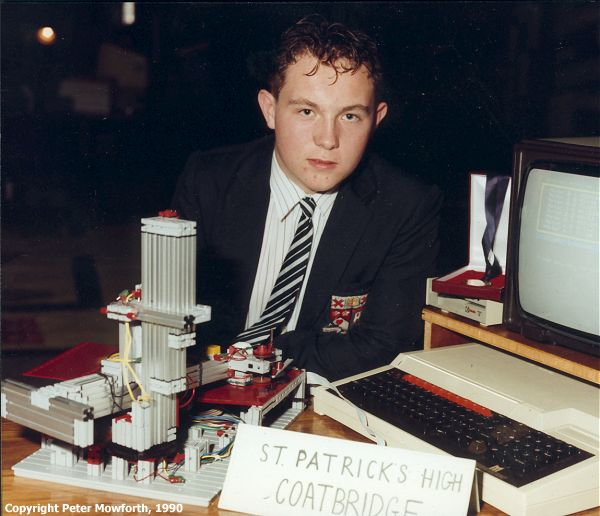
Brian Carr, St Patricks High, Coatbridge, Scotland.

== Sponsorship ==
As well as being organised by The Turing Institute and hosted by the University of Strathclyde, the event had seven main sponsors:

- NatWest Bank (London)
- IEEE (Robotics & Automation Society)
- Scottish Development Agency
- Stakis Hotels (Glasgow)
- Caithness Glass
- Holiday Inn (Glasgow)
- British Gas (Olympic Torch and Olympic flame)

== See also ==
- World Robot Olympiad – International Lego robot competition
- World Humanoid Robot Games – Multi-sport event featuring robots
