= World Robot Olympiad =

International Lego robot competition

- Formerly: International Robot Olympiad
- Sport: Robotics-related games
- Founded: 2004
- First season: 2004
- Motto: To bring together young people all over the world to develop their creativity, design & problem solving skills through challenging & educational robot competitions and activities
- No. of teams: 28,000 (2019)
- Countries: See below
- Venue: See Below
- Most titles: Unknown; possibly Taiwan, Malaysia or Thailand
- Qualification: By winning the national/state competition
- Related competitions: FIRST Robotics Competition; FIRST Tech Challenge; FIRST Lego League Explore; FIRST Lego League Challenge; RoboCup Junior; Robofest
- Website: https://wro-association.org

The World Robot Olympiad (WRO) is a global robotics competition for young people. The World Robot Olympiad competition uses Lego Mindstorms manufactured by LEGO Education. First held in 2004 in Singapore, it now attracts more than 70,000 students from more than 95 countries.

The competition consists of 4 different categories: RoboMission, RoboSports, Future Innovators, Future Engineers. and for the RoboMission and Future Innovators categories, it consists of three different age groups: Elementary, Junior High and Senior High. Participants below the age of 13 are considered as Elementary, participants from ages 11 until 15 years old are considered Junior High, and participants between 14 and 19 are considered Senior High.

== History ==
WRO was formally established in 2004, with the first international WRO final organized in 2004. Organizations from China, Japan, Singapore and Korea are considered the founding countries. In 2004, teams from China, Chinese Taipei, Hong Kong, India, Indonesia, Japan, Korea, Malaysia, Philippines, Russia, Singapore and Thailand took part in the first international final, held in Singapore.

In 2004, the four founding countries established the international WRO Committee (now known as the WRO Advisory Council), which decided to establish a new and permanent robotics organisation, based on the idea that students from all over the world should have the opportunity to meet with other students to fulfil the new mission statement: "To bring together young people all over the world to develop their creativity, design & problem solving skills through challenging & educational robot competitions and activities"

The WRO Committee decided on the new name World Robot Olympiad, and new WRO logos were developed. The WRO statutes and a set of general rules were worked out to ensure a sound and safe future for WRO. One of the major decisions, which appears in the Statutes, was that the international WRO event should be hosted by a new country each year and the WRO Committee should elect a chairman.

In 2017, the host country of WRO was Costa Rica. This was the first time the competition was held outside the Asia Region and the first time it came to the Americas.

In 2023, the world finals were hosted by Panama City.

In 2024, the world finals were hosted by Izmir, Turkey.

In 2025, the world finals were hosted again in Singapore

== Categories ==
At WRO, competitions are offered for students in the age from 8 – 19 (22 for the Future Engineers Category). WRO have four competition categories, with their own characteristics and challenges:

- RoboMission
- RoboSports
- Future Innovators
- Future Engineers

Each season the challenges and theme for the RoboMission and Future Innovators are developed with the country that hosts the International Final. The RoboSports rules and the Future Engineers Challenge game are designed together with experts in the robotic sciences community.

=== Overview of all WRO categories ===
	RoboMission	Future Innovators	RoboSports	Future Engineers
Age	Elementary: 8–12 Junior: 11–15 Senior: 14–19	Elementary: 8–12 Junior: 11–15 Senior: 14–19	11-19	14-22
Hardware	Free choice with restrictions on size, weight, number of motors and sensors used	LEGO controlled + no restriction for other materials	Only LEGO + a camera module	no restrictions on material
Software	Free choice	Free choice	Free choice	Free choice
Maximum size	Max. 25 x 25 x 25 cm	Booth of 2 × 2 × 2 meters	Two robots, max. 20 x 20 x 20 cm	Max. 30 x 20 x 30 cm
Characteristics	Surprise rule with robots coming prebuilt on competition day.	Individual booths to showcase project to judges	Game follows a double-table tennis format	Robots come prebuilt on competition day.
At WRO since	2004	2004	2022	2022

=== RoboMission ===
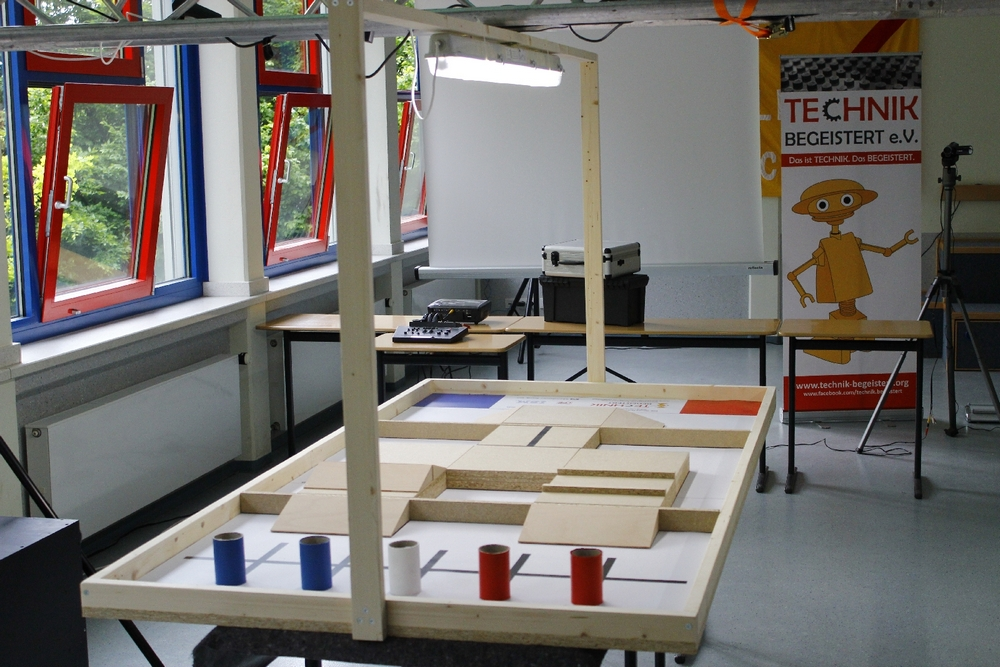
The Game Table of the WRO2012 Junior High division

Teams must create a robot which can complete a specified mission determined by the organiser and usually based on the Future Innovators theme. As of the 2022 season, robots are no longer required to be assembled at the competition venue. Instead, teams are allowed to build their robots before arriving to the competition venue. Each robot is restricted to be 25 × 25 × 25 cm (9.8 × 9.8 × 9.8 in) before the round begins, with specified number of motors and sensors depending on each competition category. It must finish the mission autonomously, within a maximum time of two minutes. Teams are judged on their scores. If two teams' scores are equal, they are judged by their time to the nearest millisecond. This category was called Regular category until 2021.

==== RoboMission characteristics ====
- Three age groups: Elementary (8 to 12y), Junior (11-15y) and Senior (14-19y.)
- Hardware: Every team builds one robot to solve the challenges on the field. Teams are allowed to use any materials and components to build the robot.
- Software: Any software and any firmware can be run on the controllers.
- Maximum robot size: 25 cm x 25 cm x 25 cm.
- Surprise Rule: A surprise rule will be announced when the competition starts, to test the team's ability to adapt their hardware or programming. (Note: some member countries have a slightly different approach to the surprise rule.)
- Assembly: As of the 2022 season, assembly of the robots at the competition venue is no longer required
- Team: A team consists of 1 coach and 2 or 3 team members.

=== Future Innovators ===
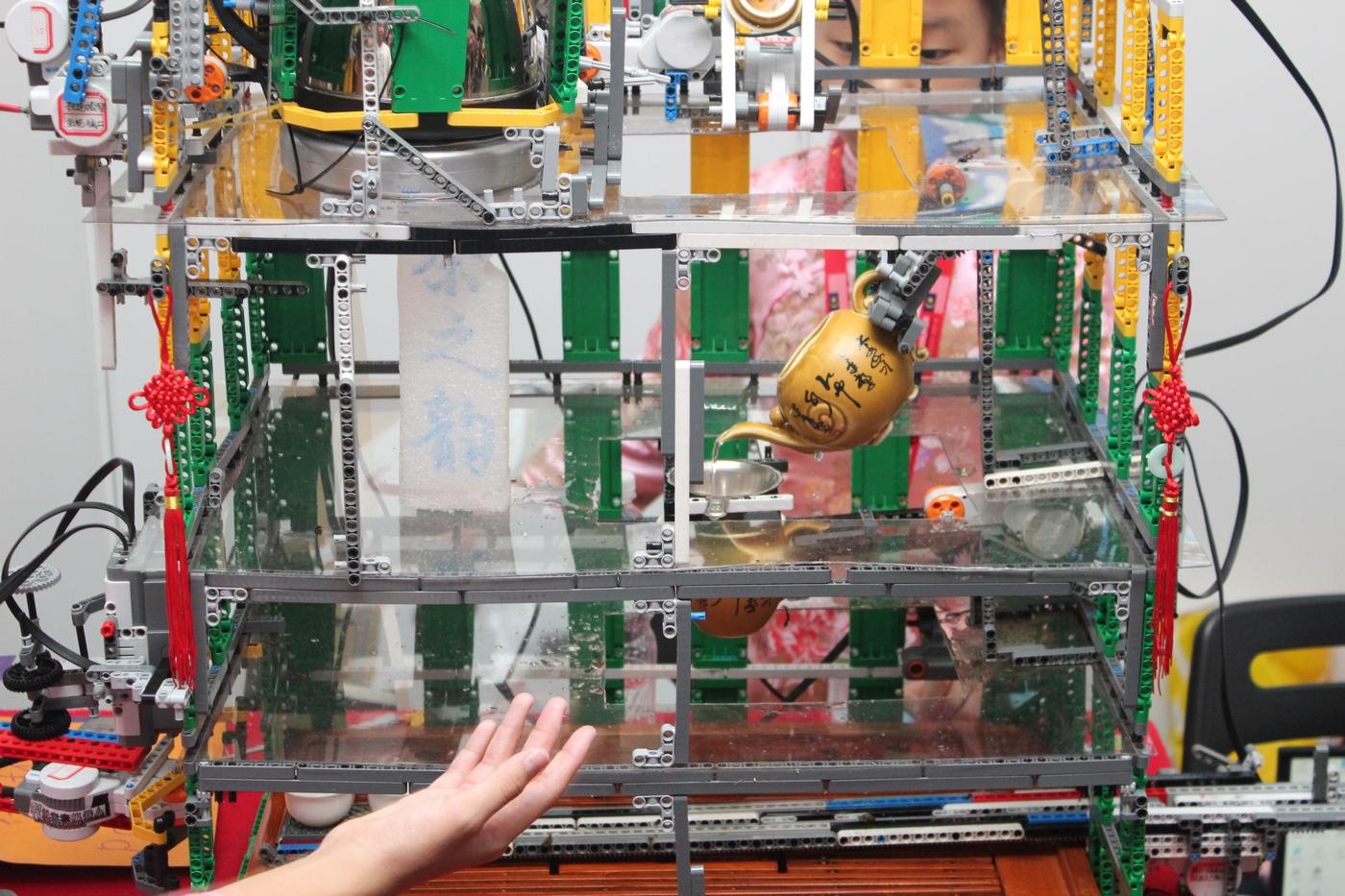
A robot built for the Future Innovators category

Future Innovators is a project based competition. Students create their own intelligent robotics solution relating to the current theme of the season. Teams will present their project and their robot model to a group of judges on the competition day. This category was called Open category until 2021

==== Future Innovators characteristics ====
- Three age groups: Elementary (8 to 12y), Junior (11-15y) and Senior (14-19y.)
- Hardware: No restriction on the balance between LEGO and other elements.
- Software: Free choice of programming language / software.
- Maximum size: Teams present the idea in a 2 m x 2 m x 2 m booth on the competition day.
- Team: A team consists of 1 coach and 2 or 3 team members.

=== RoboSports ===
WRO RoboSports is a competition where two teams each have two autonomous robots on the field playing a sports game. The two robots of one team may communicate with each other, but no further communication is allowed. The robot needs to be built from LEGO materials and a camera of their choice. The game changes every 3 or 4 years, the current game is Double Tennis.

==== RoboSports characteristics ====
- One age group: 11–19 years old.
- Hardware: Teams need two robots to participate in RoboSports. The controller, motors and sensors used to assemble robots must be from LEGO sets. Only LEGO branded elements may be used to construct the remaining parts of the robot. In addition, teams will need a camera module.
- Software: Free choice of programming language / software.
- Maximum robot size: 20 cm x 20 cm x 20 cm.
- Assembly: The teams bring their robot completely disassembled. In the first part of the competition they will have 120 minutes to assemble their robots from loose parts without instructions.
- Team: A team consists of 1 coach and 2 or 3 team members.

=== Future Engineers ===
WRO Future Engineers is a competition where each team has to engineer and solve real-world-problems. Teams can use any kind of material and controller for their robot. The game changes every 3 or 4 years, the current game is about autonomous driving.

==== Future Engineers characteristics ====
- One age group: 14–19 years old.
- Hardware: Free choice
- Software: Free choice of programming language / software.
- Maximum robot size: 30 cm x 20 cm x 30 cm.
- Team: A team consists of 1 coach and 2 or 3 team members.

=== WRO Football (outdated) ===
WRO Football was introduced with teams of two autonomous robots playing football (soccer). Every year little changes were introduced for the game to motivate the students to keep on developing their robots. In 2022 WRO Football was replaced by RoboSports.

==== WRO Football characteristics ====
- One age group: 10–19 years old.
- Hardware: Teams need two robots to participate in WRO Football. The controller, motors and sensors used to assemble robots must be from LEGO MINDSTORMS sets (NXT or EV3). Only LEGO branded elements may be used to construct the remaining parts of the robot. In addition, teams will need the HiTechnic infrared ball and can use the HiTechnic infrared and compass sensors.
- Software: Only LEGO RoboLab, NXT and EV3 software are allowed.
- Maximum robot size: Each robot must fit inside an upright 22 cm diameter and 22 cm high cylinder and must not weigh more than 1 kg.
- Assembly: The teams bring their robot completely disassembled. In the first part of the competition they will have 120 minutes to assemble their robots from loose parts without instructions.
- Team: A team consists of 1 coach and 2 or 3 team members.

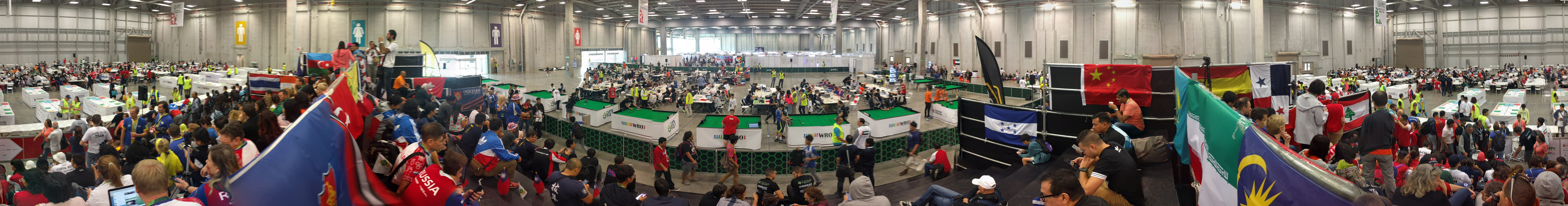
Football Competition at World Robot Olympiad Costa Rica 2017

=== Advanced Robot Challenge (University/College) (outdated) ===
The Advanced Robotics Challenge (ARC) is the newest category. The games are designed to test older and more experienced student's engineering and programming skills to the limit.

Teams compete on a set challenge. Robots may be pre-built and may use certain TETRIX and MATRIX elements. Teams may use either one MyRIO or KNR controller, or two EV3/NXT controllers; there are no restrictions on choice and number of sensors, motors and servos. The size of the robot before it begins must be within 45 × 45 × 45 cm (17.7 × 17.7 × 17.7 in). The maximum time differs depending on each competition.

In 2015 and 2016 it ran a Bowling game and in the 2017 season it was introduced the Tetrastack challenge.

==== Advanced Robotics Challenge characteristics ====
- One age group: 17–25 years old.
- Hardware: Robots must be built using MATRIX and TETRIX building systems only. There are no restrictions about the use and brand of sensors, batteries or electrical motors and servos.
- Controllers: Only National Instruments myRIO or KNR (myRIO based). Note: 2017 is the last year that LEGO EV3 controllers can be used.
- Software: Control software must be written in LabVIEW from National Instruments or any text-based language like C, C++, C#, RobotC, Java or Python.
- Maximum robot size: 45 cm x 45 cm x 45 cm.
- Team: A team consists of 1 coach and 2 or 3 team members.

== Gameplay changes ==
As the missions of the RoboMission and RoboSports get tougher and more teams in the Future Innovators are willing to present more creative-looking robots, organisers have to make changes to the list of eligible sensors, motors and bricks to be used in the competition. Initially only RCX bricks, motors and sensors were allowed. In the 2007 competition NXT bricks, motors and sensors were allowed as well. In 2011 the NXT colour sensor was added; in 2012, the HiTechnic colour sensor. In 2013 an EV3 robot was exhibited that used all four motors. In 2014, however, EV3 bricks, motors and sensors were allowed, but the number of motor ports was limited to three, and the EV3 Gyro sensor was not allowed. The 2015 competition allowed four motor ports and the gyro sensor, but not RCX bricks, motors, or sensors. In 2024, the HiTechnic sensor was disallowed from the RoboMission category. Starting from 2025, the RoboMission category has allowed robots to be composed of materials that are not strictly LEGO, such as 3D printed parts from PLA, metal, and third-party motors. There is now a weight restriction of 1500 grams.

There are also a few changes to the number of categories. The earlier versions of this competition, before 2006, consists of only Regular and Open and that further sub-divides to only two age groups, Primary and High School.

== Age group definitions ==
=== Compete with peers ===
WRO has the goal of being relevant to students of different ages, which is why it offers competitions on platforms that provide fun and challenging experiences.

It is also why it has decided two of the categories into three age groups. In the RoboMission, each age group has a different mission. In Future Innovators, the challenge is the same for all participants, but they are judged within their age group.

Please note:

The mentioned ages reflect the age of the participant in the year of the competition, not at the competition day. For participation in the international WRO final it is strictly enforced that students cannot, at any time in the year of the competition, be older than specified in the age group definitions. Example: A participant that is still 12 years old at the time of the international WRO final in November, but turns 13 years old in December the same year cannot participate in Elementary Category.

=== Age groups RoboMission ===
Elementary	Participants 8 – 12 years old in the year of competition.
Junior	Participants 11 – 15 years old in the year of competition.
Senior	Participants 14 – 19 years old in the year of competition.

=== Age groups Future Innovators ===
Elementary	Participants 8 – 12 years old in the year of competition.
Junior	Participants 11 – 15 years old in the year of competition.
Senior	Participants 14 – 19 years old in the year of competition.

=== Age group RoboSports ===
Participants 11 – 19 years old in the year of competition.

=== Age group Future Engineers ===
Participants 14-22 years old in the year of competition.

== Table of Eligibility (TOE) ==
=== Qualification for the international final ===
Only teams that participated in a national competition in the ward one of our member countries can qualify for the international final. The WRO Table of Eligibility (TOE) defines how many teams a WRO National Organizer can register for the international final.

- The number of teams a National Organizer may send to the international final depends on the number of teams in the national competition.
- Each competition category has its own TOE.
- A country has to have minimum 5 teams in a competition category to register teams for the international WRO final for that category.
- A team may participate in only one competition; Regular Category, Open Category, WRO Football or Advanced Robotics Challenge.
- Any student may participate in one team only.
- The numbers in the tables are maximum per age group and category and cannot be transferred from one age group or category to another. National Organizers may register fewer teams than allowed, but never more.
- In Regular category, if a country does not compete in a certain age group, it is not allowed to swap teams around. (For example: If you have 5–99 teams and you don't compete in Senior age group, it is not allowed to bring 1 Elementary and 2 Junior teams.)

=== Qualification RoboMission ===
Teams at national level	Entries in Elementary	Entries in Junior	Entries in Senior
5–99	1	1	1
100–299	2	2	2
300–599	3	3	3
600+	4	4	4

=== Qualification Future Innovators ===
Teams at national level	Entries
5–39	2
40–149	3
150+	4

=== Qualification RoboSports ===
Teams at national level	Entries
5–39	1
40–149	2
150+	3

=== Qualification Future Engineers ===
Teams at national level	Entries
5–19	1
20–39	2
40+	3

== Hosts ==
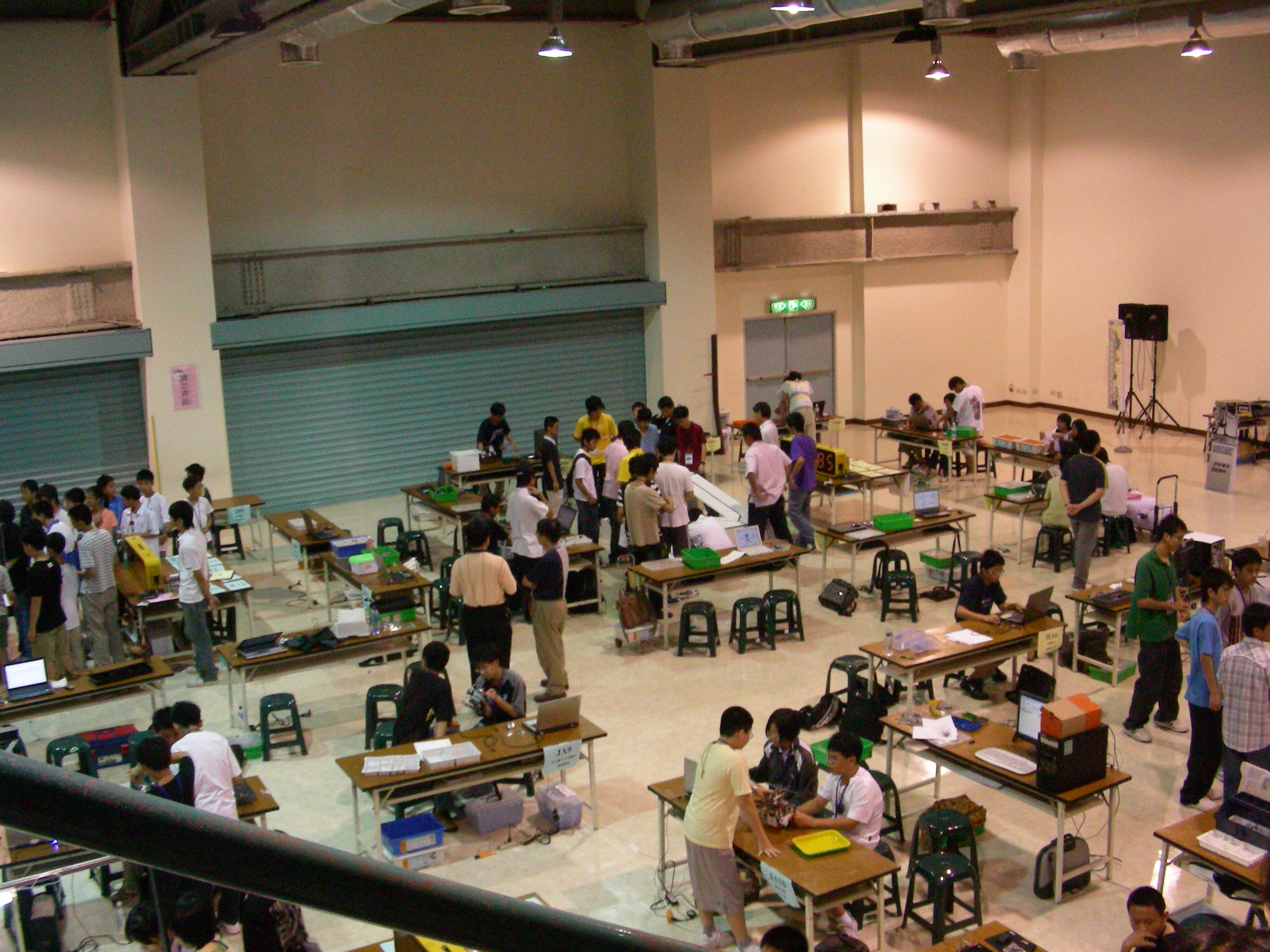
WRO2007 in Taiwan

Year	Host city	Host venue	Competition Theme	National Organiser	Description of Regular Category challenges	Notes
2004	Singapore	Downtown East Pasir Ris	Robots in Sports	Science Centre		
2005	Bangkok, Thailand	Bangkok Science Center	Sensitive robots	Gammaco		
2006	Nanning, China		Humanoid	Semia		
2007	Taipei, Taiwan	National Taiwan University	Robot for Rescue			
2008	Yokohama, Japan	Pacifico Yokohama	Saving the Global Environment	Afrel, WRO Japan		
2009	Pohang, South Korea	Postech	Artistic Robots		For the elementary category, the robot has to shoot a ping-pong ball into an allocated cup. For the Junior High category, the robot must collect 100 ping-pong balls and bring it back to the base. For Senior High, the robot place coloured balls into a compartment depending on its colour.	
2010	Manila, Philippines	SMX Convention Center	Robots promote tourism	Felta Multimedia		
2011	Abu Dhabi, United Arab Emirates	Abu Dhabi National Exhibition Centre	Robots for life improvement	Abu Dhabi Education Council ADEC	For elementary, the robot has to solve a labyrinth while taking three ping-pong balls along the way. For Junior High, the robot has to climb a flight of stairs while trying carrying an egg. For Senior High, the robot has to place lego blocks into a certain area depending its size and colour.	
2012	Kuala Lumpur, Malaysia	Sunway Pyramid Convention Center	Robot Connecting People	Sasbadi Sdn Bhd	In the elementary category, the robot has to disposed a number of ping-pong balls depending on the colour of a square cell that it is on. In the junior High category, the robot has to move a series of cylinder over hurdles before sorting them out based on their colours. In Senior high, robots have to pick up a hollow brick and slot in on a coloured pole of the same colour.	
2013	Jakarta, Indonesia	Ecovention Hall	World Heritage	Mikroskil/Mikrobot	For Elementary, the robot has to sort out batik cubes by colour in a pattern. For Junior high, robots have to restore Borobudur by removing the stupas from 4 different relic statues and determine which one is broken (it is different as for having no minifigures placed on the statue and black in colour) which it has to bring to the finishing area. For Senior High, the robot has to pick up eggs of a Komodo dragon (represented by a red ball) and leave the other eggs alone (represented by a blue ball).	
2014	Sochi, Russia	Sochi Main Media Centre	Robots And Space	Association of Children's Goods Industry Enterprises	For Elementary, robots have to build a rocket with the colours of the Russian Flag (In order, white, blue and red). For Junior High, the robot has to pick up space debris (bricks) and failed satellites (balls (both red) and leave the working satellites (blue balls). For Senior High, the robot must activate solar panels (blue and red in colour) and replace the solar panels which are not working (red) with the good ones).	
2015	Doha, Qatar	Al Shaqab	Robot Explorers		For elementary, robots must push nine cubes and dispose a number of ping-pong balls depending on the cubes' colour. For Junior High, the robot must first scan a colour key to determine a location of an artefact (blocks) before it leading to one other artefact. There are five artefacts in total but there are some artefacts which the robot can't pick up. For senior high, the robots must place a block on top of a mountain depending on the mountain and the block's colour.	
2016	New Delhi, India	India Expo Center	Rap the Scrap	India STEM Foundation	WRO India 2016 will engage students to Rap (talk) about waste – an important social issue. Students are expected to come up with innovative solutions using robotics technology to Rap the Scrap i.e. to reduce, manage and recycle waste!	
2017	San José, Costa Rica	Parque Viva	Sustainabots: Robots for sustainability	Aprender Haciendo S.A	Sustainabots are designed to care for the planet, the people and themselves. A Sustainabot is developed to change our world without affecting it, integrating the 3 pillars of Sustainability: Environmental, Social and Economical.The main themes are Sustainable Tourisms, Carbon Neutrality and Renewable and Clean Energy. The creation of sustainable robots can help us to have sustainable regions all around the world. They can help reach the Sustainable Development Goals.	
2018	Chiang Mai, Thailand		Food Matters			Thailand is the first country to host WRO twice.
2019	Győr, Hungary		Smart Cities			
2020	Quebec, Canada		Climate Squad			The event was cancelled due to the COVID-19 pandemic, marking the first cancellation of a WRO event.
2021	(United Nations) Online					
2022	Dortmund, Germany	Westfalenhallen	My Robot My Friend	TECHNIK BEGEISTERT e.V.		
2023	Panama	Panama Convention Center	Connecting the world	Fundesteam		
2024	İzmir, Turkey	Fuar İzmir	Earth Allies	Bilim Kahramanları Derneği		
2025	Singapore	Sands Expo and Convention Centre	Future of Robots	Space Faculty		Singapore is the second nation to host WRO twice, after their first at the inaugural event in 2004. This is the first Competition which any microcontroller and software can be used. Other generic rules still apply.
2026	Puerto Rico	Puerto Rico Convention Center	Robots Meet Culture	Techno Inventors		Not the same organizer as the USA organizer (US Engineering League)

== Countries participating ==
Previous host countries are italicised while future host countries are bolded. Countries which are both previous and future hosts will have an asterisks (*).

Country	First joined	Organiser	Notes
Argentina	2023	Fundación Innovar / Fundesteam	http://wro-argentina.com.ar/
Lithuania	2014		
Armenia	2014	Ayb Educational Foundation	Competition Website
Australia	2011	RoboCup Junior Australia	
Bahrain	2011	https://www.amais.edu.bh/	
Bangladesh	2020	Bangladesh Open Source Network	Competition Website
Belarus	2014	School of Robotics	
Bolivia	2009	Centro de Tecnologia Aplicada	
Bosnia and Herzegovina	2020	Univerzitet u Zenici	
Brazil	2014	AMEducação	
Brunei	2012	STEP Centre, Ministry of Education	
Canada	2014	Robotique Zone 01 Robotics	
Chile	2019	Fundacion Redes Creativas	Website
China	2004	Semia	
Taiwan / Chinese Taipei	2004	ESUN Robot Association in Taiwan	Both Chinese Taipei and Taiwan are used in this Olympiad although the name Chinese Taipei is officially used by the WRO committee. Both Chinese Taipei and Taiwanese flags are used during the competition but the Chinese Taipei flag is officially used.
Costa Rica	2009	Aprender Haciendo Costa Rica S.A.	
Croatia	2019	HROBOS	Website
Denmark	2006	Dept. of Computer Science at Aarhus University/DITEK	Was previously organised by FIRST Scandinavia along with Sweden and Norway
Egypt	2007	Searag	
Germany	2009	Technik Begeistert e.V.	Competition Website
Ghana	2012	Ghana Robotics Academy Foundation	
Greece	2009	Knowledge Research SA	WRO Hellas
Hungary	2015	Edutus College	
Honduras	2017	Honduras STEM Foundation	
Hong Kong	2004	Peach Creative Production	
India	2004	India STEM Foundation (ISF)	Competition Website
Indonesia	2004	Mikroskil/Mikrobot	
Iran	2006	Global Brand Toys	
Japan	2004	WRO Japan	
Kazakhstan	2014	AEO "Nazarbayev Intellectual Schools" in partnership with Ministry of Education and Science	Competition Website
Kuwait	2011	MILSET Regional office for Asia	
Lebanon	2009	MindPower STEM consultancy	www.mindpowerlb.com
Malaysia	2004	Sasbadi	
Mexico	2012	Fundación Care and Share for Education, A.C./Edacom	www.wro.org.mx
Mongolia	2011	MIND STORM	
Nepal	2018	STEM Foundation Nepal	www.stemnepal.org
Netherlands	2018	Stichting WRO Nederland	www.wro-nederland.nl
New Zealand	2022	NZCILAB	Competition Website
Nicaragua	2017	COMTECH	Competition Website
Nigeria	2011	ARC Lights Limited	
Norway	2006	FIRST Scandinavia	Stopped competing by 2008.
Oman	2010	Edutech Middle East	
Palestine	2015		
Panama	2015	Fundesteam	Competition Website
Peru	2009	IEP W. von Braun SRL	
Philippines	2004	Felta Multimedia	
Qatar	2007	College of the North Atlantic	
Romania	2013	Knowledge Research	
Russia	2004	Innopolis University	
Saudi Arabia	2008	Royal Commission Robot Club	Website
South Africa	2009	Hands on Technologies	
South Korea	2004	Advanced Learning Co. Ltd	
Singapore	2004	Space Faculty	The Singapore Science Centre hosted the first Olympiad. In 2022, Science Centre Singapore announced that "WRO has decided not to continue SCS membership of the WRO from 2023 onwards". In 2023, Space Faculty was announced as the new National Organisers.
Spain	2013	Fundació educaBOT	
Sri Lanka	2004		See below.
Sweden	2007	FIRST Scandinavia	Stopped competing by 2009
Switzerland	2013	World Robot Olympiad Schweiz	https://wro.swiss/
Syria	2011	Syrian Computer Society SCS	
Thailand	2004	Gammaco	Thailand is the first country to host the Olympiad twice.
Tunisia	2014	IEEE Tunisia section	Competition Website
**Turkey**	2015	Bilim Kahramanları Derneği	
Ukraine	2009	Prolego	
United Arab Emirates	2006	Abu Dhabi Education Council	
United States of America	2014	US Engineering League	Competition Website
Vietnam	2013		

== See also ==
- First Robot Olympics – First international advanced robotics event with multiple competitions
- World Humanoid Robot Games – Multi-sport event featuring robots
