= World Humanoid Robot Games =

Multi-sport event featuring robots

- Frequency: Annual
- Inaugurated: 2025 – Beijing, China
- Most recent: 2026 – Beijing, China

The World Humanoid Robot Games (WHRG) is a competition featuring humanoid robots. It was first held in Beijing in August 2025.

== Format ==
Contests are divided into competition events, which are sporting contests that follow rules similar to their human equivalents, and scenario-based events, which are challenges based on potential real-world operating scenarios.

"Autonomy" is a major part of the competition and each event has an "Autonomy Weight Coefficient" which determines how autonomous robots must be to compete. Full autonomy means that the robot completes an event without a human operator being "in the loop".

In the latest 2026 edition, many competition events require robots to operate fully autonomously. In scenario-based events where full autonomy is not required, Games officials award full points to robots operating autonomously, while robots relying on teleoperation receive only half the available points.

As of 2026, activities that mandate full autonomy include sprints, 4 x 100m relay, soccer, tai chi, and gymnastics. Other events, such as the 400m obstacle course and kickboxing, do not make full autonomy compulsory and permit a human to be in the loop.

== Editions ==
=== 2025 ===
2025 World Humanoid Robot Games
- Host city: Beijing
- Country: China
- Organizers: China Media Group, Beijing Municipal People's Government, World Robot Cooperation Organization, Asia-Pacific RoboCup International Council
- Teams: 280
- Athletes: 500+
- Events: 26
- Opening: August 15, 2025
- Closing: August 17, 2025
- Ceremony venue: Beijing National Stadium (opening ceremony) Beijing National Speed Skating Oval (closing ceremony)

The 2025 World Humanoid Robot Games (Chinese: 2025世界人形机器人运动会) was held in Beijing in August 2025. The inaugural edition featured 280 teams and more than 500 humanoid robots competing in 26 events, including boxing, football, cleaning and medicine sorting.

=== 2026 ===
2026 World Humanoid Robot Games
- Host city: Beijing
- Country: China
- Organizers: China Media Group, Beijing Municipal People's Government, World Robot Cooperation Organization, Asia-Pacific RoboCup International Council
- Teams: 666
- Athletes: 2,056 robots
- Events: 51
- Opening: August 22, 2026
- Closing: August 26, 2026
- Ceremony venue: Beijing National Speed Skating Oval (opening ceremony)

The 2026 World Humanoid Robot Games was held in Beijing from 22 to 26 August 2026. The second edition features 2,056 robots from 666 teams competing in 51 events: 30 competitive events, including football, athletics, dance, table tennis and tug of war, and 21 scenario-based events simulating household and hotel services, industrial tasks, firefighting and rescue. According to the organizer's claims, 400m, 1,500m, and 4×100m relay events have become "fully autonomous" categories, requiring robots to run without remote control.

The competition saw the humanoid 100 metres record lowered twice in four days. In the opening day's race on Saturday, Tiangong Ultra won in 9.39 seconds, overtaking Honor's robot Lightning near the finish after falling behind early; Lightning recorded 9.47 seconds. Three days later Tiangong Ultra, which was developed by the Beijing Humanoid Robot Innovation Center, lowered the mark again to 8.86 seconds in a semifinal of the large-size robot division. All three times were faster than Usain Bolt's 9.58-second human world record in the 100m, set in 2009. Tiangong had won the same event at the inaugural games a year earlier in 21.50 seconds.

The Beijing Humanoid Robot Innovation Center said on 25 August that its Tiangong robots had beaten four human world records at the games: the 100 metres, the 400 metres, the 1,500 metres and the high jump. It gave the 400 metres time as 38.15 seconds, against a human world record of 43.03 seconds, and the 1,500 metres as 2 minutes 21.64 seconds.

In the standing high jump, a new record of 2.88 meters was set, 43 centimeters higher than the human world record of 2.45 meters held by Cuban athlete Javier Sotomayor.

== Coverage ==
The contests serve to showcase the humanoid robotics industry and provide benchmarks for development, while attracting public interest as well as potential investors and clients. In 2026 NBC News raised whether, despite breaking human sporting records, humanoid robots can be useful in managing daily problems, with CBS News and TechRadar noting some of the robots competing at the 2026 events tripped, broke apart, or caught fire. Forbes described the games as "one of the most honest documents in robotics right now" as it reveals which tasks can currently be done by robots autonomously while also showing the areas where it is still needs the aid of human operators.

== See also ==
- First Robot Olympics – First international advanced robotics event with multiple competitions
- World Robot Olympiad – International Lego robot competition
