= Claude Sammut =

- Occupation: Professor
- Employer: University of New South Wales
- Known for: Leads the robotics research group at the UNSW School of Computer Science and Engineering Past President of the RoboCup Federation (2022-2024)
- Title: Professor
- Term: 1999 - present
- Website: http://www.cse.unsw.edu.au/~claude

Claude Sammut is a professor of computer science and engineering at the University of New South Wales and leads the robotics research group in the School of Computer Science and Engineering. He is a Past President of the RoboCup Federation 2022 - 2024.
