= Robotica (TV series) =

- Genre: Robot competition
- Created by: Bruce Nash
- Presented by: Ahmet Zappa; Tanya Memme; Tanika Ray; Dan Danknick
- Country of origin: United States
- Original language: English
- No. of seasons: 3
- No. of episodes: 21

Production
- Running time: 60 minutes (inc. commercials)

Original release
- Network: TLC
- Release: April 4, 2001 – November 16, 2002

Robotica is a robot combat show (similar to the early seasons of Robot Wars) produced for the American television cable channel TLC, a subsidiary of the Discovery Channel, from April 4, 2001, to November 16, 2002. Ahmet Zappa and Tanya Memme hosted all three seasons while Tanika Ray only hosted the first season with Dan Danknick replacing her for the second and third seasons.

== Season 1 ==
Each preliminary show in the first season of Robotica featured four robots weighing as much as 210 pounds paired off in a series of three challenges. The winners of each pairing faced each other in a Robot-sumo style "Fight to the Finish" to determine the winner of the show.

- The first challenge was The Speedway. Robots raced in opposite directions around a figure-8 track. Each lap was worth 10 points and the robot which was ahead at the end of a two-minute time limit would earn 20 bonus points (it was also stated that the first robot to complete 8 laps would get the bonus points, but this never happened). While only occurring a few times, going out of bounds would incur a 10-point penalty.
- The second challenge was The Maze. Robots negotiated obstacles in two identical, twisting courses that met in the middle. Five obstacles (teeter ramp, push box, rotating paddles, speed bumps and portcullis, and waterfall) worth 15 points each, plus 25 points for the first robot to the center platform. This challenge had a three-minute time limit, and if both robots got stuck at an obstacle and/or couldn't get past it before time ran out, they would earn points based on the obstacles they cleared up to that point.
- The third challenge was The Gauntlet. Robots crashed through barrier walls of increasing difficulty. Five barriers (glass pane, paint cans filled with sand, bricks, concrete paving stones, and a heavy safe) worth 15 points each, plus 25 points to the first robot to complete the course. This challenge had a three-minute time limit and like the Maze, if both robots were stuck, the round ends early and their score would be based on how many barriers they cleared up to that point.

Total points were added for the three events to determine a winner. While only happening once, in the event of a tie, the robot who won the greater number of events advanced.

The Fight to The Finish took place on a 16' by 16' platform elevated high above the floor. A low guard rail surrounded the platform for the first minute and then fell away. The last robot on the platform moved on to the finals.

The finals worked the same way as the preliminary shows, except there were six robots, competing in three pairs. Three robots met in the Fight to the Finish. The winner of the show was awarded the largest cash prize in robot combat to that date: $12,000.

=== Competitors and results ===
- Heat 1: Run Amok - Red Team/Purple Team (heat winner, season winner) vs. Spring Breaker - Blue Team (lost preliminary round)/Killer B - Silver Team (heat runner-up) vs. Mini Inferno - Gold Team (lost preliminary round)
- Heat 2: Kritical Mass - Red Team/Orange Team (heat winner, lost prelims in finals due to winning only one event in a tie) vs. Grimlock - Blue Team (lost preliminary round)/Boelter Beast - Silver Team (lost preliminary round) vs. Hot Wheels - Gold Team (heat runner-up)
- Heat 3: Wendingo - Red Team (heat runner-up) vs. i-Droid - Blue Team (lost preliminary round)/Crisis Management - Silver Team (lost preliminary round) vs. Jaw Breaker - Gold Team/Red Team (heat winner, lost prelim in finals)
- Heat 4: Ram Force - Red Team/Blue Team (heat winner, 2nd place in finals) vs. HandsOFF! - Blue Team (lost preliminary round)/Pandora's Bot - Silver Team (lost preliminary round) vs. Solar Flare - Gold Team (heat runner-up)
- Heat 5: Juggerbot - Red Team/Silver Team (heat winner, 3rd place in finals) vs. Noll - Blue Team (withdrew following Speedway)/Hamerschlag - Silver Team (heat runner-up) vs. Krypler - Gold Team (lost preliminary round)
- Heat 6: Panzer Mk 1 - Red Team (heat runner-up) vs. Malvolio - Blue Team (lost preliminary round)/Viper - Silver Team/Gold Team (heat winner, lost prelim in finals) vs. Evil Beaver - Gold Team (lost preliminary round)

== Seasons 2 and 3 ==
Robotica seasons 2 and 3 featured redesigned challenges. The Speedway was eliminated, The Gauntlet was redesigned, and The Maze had been completely re-done and renamed The Labyrinth.

The former side-by-side Gauntlet course was now arranged in a diamond-shape. The first barrier wall was now a wooden plank, the walls of metal cans, bricks, and concrete paving stones remained, and the safe was gone. Each robot had to complete their own two legs of the diamond and then return through the opponent's rubble field before climbing a ramp up to the Forest of Glass in the center of the diamond. When all the glass strips were broken, a final glass sheet lowered as the final challenge. Scoring was 10 points for each barrier, 5 points for each rubble wall, 10 points for first up the ramp, 5 points for second up the ramp, 15 points for the final glass pane. This challenge had 150 total points available and a three-minute time limit.

Jawbreaker's Revenge battles Buzzbomb at the 'Rollers' obstacle: Robotica season 3

The former two-path Maze was now a single Labyrinth wherein both robots could roam to choose from six scoring obstacles. Also roaming the Labyrinth were two rat-shaped robots named the "Robotica Rats" that could interfere with (or sometimes help) the competitors. Breaking the glass strip beyond each obstacle claimed the points. Obstacles were:

1. Push Box - 15 points
2. Lifting Spikes - 15 points
3. Suspension Bridge - 20 points
4. Flipper - 20 points
5. Rollers - 25 points
6. Sand Box - 25 points

Robots started together in a motorized rotating turntable, where combat was encouraged. While it only occurred once, a robot could be penalized the entire point total for an obstacle if they broke down or got stuck in a position that blocked access to the obstacle. Additionally, as seen in the Labyrinth bout between Jawbreaker's Revenge and Buzzbomb, if one robot broke a strip with their opponent, it would count as them and not their opponent breaking it and therefore they get the points instead of their opponent getting them.

At the end of three minutes, or when all the obstacles were cleared, the exit opened. The final glass strip on the far side of the exit was worth 30 points. This challenge had 150 total points available and a four-minute time limit.

The winning pair of robots faced each other in The Fight to The Finish. The platform was enlarged from season 1; it was now a 25' by 25' elevated platform. A new rule called for robots to hold the other robot 'pinned' for no more than 15 seconds before release. A low guard rail surrounded the platform for the first minute, then fell away. The last robot on the platform moved on to the finals.

For the finals, three pairs of robots competed in The Gauntlet. The two robots with the lowest scores were eliminated, and the remaining four robots paired off for The Labyrinth. The two winning robots met in The Fight to The Finish to determine the champion.

=== Competitors and results ===
==== Season 2 ====
- Heat 1: Zero (heat runner-up) vs. KaNuckle Buster (lost preliminary round)/The Killa Gorilla (heat winner, eliminated in Gauntlet in finals) vs. Tetanus (lost preliminary round)
- Heat 2: Fintastic! (lost preliminary round) vs. Scarab (heat runner-up)/TakaTakaTak (lost preliminary round) vs. Flexy Flyer (heat winner, season winner)
- Heat 3: Armorgeddon (heat winner, eliminated in Gauntlet in finals) vs. Kraken (lost preliminary round)/Metalmorphis (heat runner-up) vs. Skewer Rat (lost preliminary round)
- Heat 4: Whyatica (lost preliminary round) vs. Jav Man (heat runner-up)/IntriVerter (lost preliminary round) vs. Deb Bot (heat winner, eliminated in Labyrinth in finals)
- Heat 5: Ill-Tempered Mutt (heat winner, eliminated in Labyrinth in finals) vs. The Wizard of Sawz (lost preliminary round)/Shannonagains (lost preliminary round) vs. Mechacidal Maniac (heat runner-up)
- Heat 6: Son of a Monkey's Wrench (lost preliminary round) vs. BotZilla (heat winner, season runner-up)/Northern Fury (lost preliminary round) vs. Thor (heat runner-up)

==== Season 3 ====
- Heat 1: Denominator (lost preliminary round) vs. Juggerbot 3.0 (heat winner, season runner-up)/Da Claw (heat runner-up) vs. Logoseye (lost preliminary round)
- Heat 2: Jawbreaker's Revenge (heat winner, eliminated in Labyrinth in finals) vs. Buzz Bomb (lost preliminary round)/Pangolin (heat runner-up) vs. Nemo's Nemesis (lost preliminary round)
- Heat 3: Tiger Wood (heat runner-up) vs. The Tick (lost preliminary round)/Fury (lost preliminary round) vs. Ultra Violence (heat winner, eliminated in Labyrinth in finals)
- Heat 4: Hammerhead (lost preliminary round) vs. Mini-Rip (heat winner, eliminated in Gauntlet in finals)/Pshhht! (heat runner-up) vs. Scrap 8.2 (lost preliminary round)
- Heat 5: Panzer Mk III (heat winner, season winner) vs. Re-IntriVerter (lost preliminary round)/Terror (lost preliminary round) vs. Zeus (heat runner-up)
- Heat 6: Rambot (heat winner, eliminated in Gauntlet in finals) vs. Dark Track (lost preliminary round)/Viper Rev. 2 (heat runner-up) vs. Particle Accelerator (lost preliminary round)

== Winning robots ==
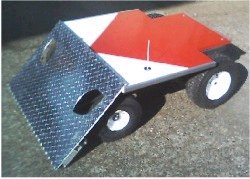
Robotica Season 1 winner, Run Amok

- Season 1: Run Amok
- Season 2:
- Season 3: Panzer Mk. 3

== TV Channels ==
Robotica was shown on TLC and Science Channel in the USA & Canada, Channel 5, Challenge TV and Bravo in the UK and on Discovery Channel in Europe. Unlike Robot Wars and Battlebots, Robotica hasn't been rebooted yet.

== See also ==
- BattleBots
- Robot combat
- Robot Wars (TV series)
- Robot-sumo
