= EngineAI =

Chinese robotics company

Shenzhen EngineAI Robotics Technology Co., Ltd.
- Trade name: EngineAI
- Native name: 深圳市众擎机器人科技有限公司
- Romanized name: Shēnzhèn Shùnqíng Jīqìrén Kējì Yǒuxiàn Gōngsī
- Type: Private
- Industry: Robotics; Artificial intelligence
- Founded: October 2023; 3 years ago
- Founders: Zhao Tongyang and Ren Guowen
- Headquarters: Shenzhen, Guangdong, China
- Key people: Zhao Tongyang (CEO)
- Products: Humanoid robots and quadrupedal robots
- Website: www.engineai.com.cn

EngineAI
- Simplified Chinese: 深圳市众擎机器人科技有限公司
Transcriptions

EngineAI, full name Shenzhen EngineAI Robotics Technology Co., Ltd. (Chinese: 深圳市众擎机器人科技有限公司), is a Chinese robotics company specializing in proprietary hardware and AI systems designed to enable human-like performance in Humanoid robots. Co-founded by Zhao Tongyang, the company was established in October 2023 and is headquartered in Shenzhen, China.

Its products have included the PM01 and SE01 humanoid robots, which have drawn global attention for their human-like movements. Its SE01 is reportedly the world's first humanoid to have a natural human-like walking gait, and is able to do so at speeds up to 2 meters per second. In 2025, the company released a video demonstrating its PM01 robot as the world's first humanoid to successfully perform a front flip. The company also introduced the T800 humanoid robot that has a peak joint torque of 450 Nm and is designed for industrial applications, as well as performing martial arts movements. In July 2026, it debuted Ultimate Robot Knock-out Legend (URKL), the world's first professional freestyle combat league for full-sized humanoids featuring the T800s.

== History ==
A Engine AI robot plays Axe Gang Dance, imitating the dances from Kung Fu Hustle in 2025.

The co-founder of EngineAI Robotics is Zhao Tongyang, who had already worked in the related industry for eight years before establishing Shenzhen EngineAI Robotics Technology Co., Ltd. in October 2023. In 2012, Zhao Tongyang started a business in Internet of Things (IoT) devices and, in 2016, used the earnings from that venture to fund the development of humanoid robot. After 2018, Zhao shifted his focus to quadruped robots and co-founded Shenzhen Pengxing Intelligent Research Co., Ltd. with XPeng Motors to continue research in the field of robotics. Subsequently, Zhao took his intellectual property out of Pengxing Intelligent and founded Shenzhen EngineAI Robotics Technology Co., Ltd., with its headquarters located in the Shenzhen Bay Innovation and Technology Center in Nanshan District, Shenzhen, Guangdong Province, China. The core team of EngineAI Robotics also largely comes from XPeng's robotics team, "Pengxing Intelligent Robotics".

In July 2024, EngineAI launched its first bipedal robot, SA01, with a retail price of 38,500 RMB. In October of the same year, EngineAI released its first full-size general-purpose humanoid robot, SE01, which made its debut at the "Setting Sail 2025" CCTV New Year's Gala. The robot stands 170 cm tall, weighs 55 kg, has 32 degrees of freedom, and can walk at a speed of 2 meters per second. It is capable of performing actions such as squatting, grasping, running, and jumping. The robot uses an end-to-end artificial neural network to optimize its gait performance, enabling it to take large strides instead of small steps, which is particularly challenging for bipedal robots. In December of the same year, EngineAI launched the general-purpose humanoid robot PM01, which stands 138 cm tall.

On February 23, 2025, EngineAI released a video to show its PM01 robot as the world's first humanoid to achieve a front flip. In December 2025, the company released a video showing its T800 humanoid demonstrating a "series of advanced martial arts moves". Reportedly the online responses had varied with some expressing skepticism and believing that the T800's movements were too fast and advanced to be believable. In response to the skepticism, the company released another video to show the behind-the-scenes footage as well as having the company's CEO wearing padded gear and allowing the T800 to knock him down with a kick. On January 26, 2026, the company declared it has entered a partnership with a private Chinese commercial spaceflight company to make PM01 the first humanoid robot to go to space.

In April 2026, EngineAI filed for an IPO in the Hong Kong Stock Exchange and completed a US$200 million Series B funding round which set the company's value at approximately US1.5 billion. In June, the company opened its T800 factory in Shenzen, China.

On 16 July, 2026, EngineAI debuted Ultimate Robot Knock-out Legends (URKL), the world's first MMA league for full-sized humanoid robots. The inaugural UKRL tournament saw over 200 teams registering globally with 32 teams making it past the online qualifiers and proceeding to the physical deployment cut. The league issued EngineAI's T800 robots to the 32 qualifying teams for the duration of the competition and offered a cash prize pool of 1.4 million dollars, as well as a ten kilogram pure gold belt for the champion. Hong Kong actor Donnie Yen was a special guest who attended the opening fights. One of the event's most widely reported moments occurred when a T800 robot named "White Eagle" landed an aerial roundhouse kick to the head of its opponent "Matador", initially dislodging it. Despite having its head hanging loosely from its neck, Matador continued to fight before eventually collapsing. The inaugural UKRL grand final is scheduled to be held in Dubai in around December 2026 to January 2027.

== Products ==
- PM01 – A lightweight, open-source humanoid that is capable of dynamic movements including a front flip.
- T800 – A full-size, high-mobility general-purpose humanoid robot designed for industrial applications. It's also standardized in the URKL for robot combat.
- JS01 – A rugged quadrupedal robot designed for high mobility across multiple terrains.
- SA01 – An open-source bipedal robot intended to be used as a platform for education, robotic research and development in universities and research labs.
- SE01 – A full-size general-purpose humanoid robot that is notably the company's first model to achieve a human-like natural walking gait.
- S2 – A service robot designed for customer interaction, public engagement and cultural tourism settings.

== See also ==
- Unitree Robotics
- UBtech Robotics
- CloudMinds
- Optimus (robot)
- Beijing E-Town Half-Marathon
