= Dan Danknick =

American physicist and roboticist

- Danknick c. 2003
- Education: UCI
- Occupations: physicist, roboticist

Dan Danknick is a physicist and roboticist who graduated from the University of California, Irvine, and has made several appearances on robotics-related television shows.

== Battlebots ==
Danknick gained comedic notoriety in the robotics community with his appearances on the Comedy Central show Battlebots. The robot created by his Team Delta, Hazard, was consistently one of the highest-ranked middleweight robots in the competition.

== Robotica ==
Danknick hosted The Learning Channel show Robotica for its second and third seasons, acting as a technical commentator.

== SERVO Magazine ==
Danknick served as the first technical editor of SERVO Magazine, a robotics publication. He was also a driving force behind the magazine's robotics competition, Tetsujin.
