= Robo One =

Robot competition category

Robo-One is a robot competition category of bipedal humanoid robots. The first ROBO-ONE contest was held in Japan on February 2, 2002, and consisted of an initial judged autonomous "Demonstration" stage, followed by one-on-one matches. In Japan, ROBO-ONE has spawned a whole series of related competitions including ROBO-ONE J, ROBO-ONE Special, ROBO-ONE Grand Prix, and the ROBO-ONE Technical Conference events. ROBO-ONE type contests have been held in several other countries including South Korea (official) and the United States (unofficial held by Robogames).

The robots are usually built with RC Servos as actuators and mounted together with sheet metal shapes. The most common frame material is aluminum. However, there have been entries constructed with steel, plastic, and even wood. Different sensors are used by the robot for balance and to perceive its surroundings. A small onboard micro controller or equivalent is used to control the robots movements and if the robot is autonomous it is also programmed to adjust the robots behavior in response to sensor inputs.

There have been fifteen competitions in Japan. ROBO-ONE 13 was held on March 22 and 23, at Korakuen Hall" in Takamatsu. ROBO-ONE 14 occurred on October 11–12, 2008. ROBO-ONE 14 took place in at the Pacifico Yokohama Exhibition Hall. ROBO-ONE 15 was held in Kawasaki on May 4, 2009. ROBO-ONE 16 was held in Toyama City, Toyama Prefecture, on September 26–27, 2009. The 17th ROBO-ONE tournament took place in Kawasaki on March 21, 2010. A ROBO-ONE Festival was held May 22 at the Kawasaki City Industrial Promotion Hall. The festival included both ROBO-ONE Soccer and ROBO-ONE Light events. The 18th ROBO-ONE event was held in Shibata, Niigata Prefecture on August 28–29, 2010. The ROBO-ONE 19 competitions scheduled for March 19/20 in Kawasaki were canceled due to the 2011 Tōhoku earthquake and tsunami, and were held October 8–9, 2011. The 30th ROBO-ONE took place on Sunday, February 26, 2017. The 36th ROBO-ONE took place on Sunday, February 9, 2020, at Miraikan Hall, Tokyo.

== ROBO-ONE events ==
- ROBO-ONE: The primary ROBO-ONE competitions take place twice a year, with the odd numbered competitions scheduled in the Tokyo area and the even numbered competitions staged in more remote locations to increase visibility and encourage participation in the sport.
  The first day begins with pre-screening tests that insure the entries are capable of taking a number of steps (10 steps within 10 seconds), and rising from both a supine and prone positions. This is followed by a 2-minute autonomous demonstration judged by a panel of experts - typically the key members of the ROBO-ONE organizing committee. The specific details of the scoring system used have never been publicly disclosed. Only the top scoring entries win the right to return for the second days matches.
  The matches held on the second day are roughly based on K-1 boxing events with each robot trying to knock its opponent down, or out of the ring.
- ROBO-ONE J: A 'junior' level ROBO-ONE competition that usually featured smaller robots, and gave special emphasis to family participation. As of ROBO-ONE 11 (March 2007) the ROBO-ONE J themes were combined into the primary ROBO-ONE competitions and ROBO-ONE J events were no longer staged.
- ROBO-ONE Special: Annual one-day competitions featuring a set of 'special' challenges including a timed Dash, a ball toss, climbing a set of stairs, opening a door, and an obstacle course. As of August 2006 the stair climbing and door opening challenges were combined into the obstacle course portion of the competition.
- ROBO-ONE Grand Prix: Each Winter eight to twelve of the top ROBO-ONE competitors participate in a series of matches held in different locations around Japan over a period of six to eight weeks. Points are awarded according to the win–loss records of each entry during the series.
- ROBO-ONE Technical Conference: An annual one-day conference, typically held in Kawasaki, Japan, focused on sharing information and promoting the sport. Presentations include design lectures by the top builders as well as product and technology sessions from key manufacturers.
- ROBO-ONE In The Space: A special project officially announced by the ROBO-ONE committee at ROBO-ONE 9 (March 2006) to stage ROBO-ONE competitions in low Earth orbit by October 2010.
- ROBO-ONE Soccer: A ROBO-ONE Soccer match was staged as a preliminary demonstration at the August 2006 ROBO-ONE Special competition, and also during the September 2006 ROBO-ONE 10 event in Nagai in Japan. The ROBO-ONE committee has scheduled the first official ROBO-ONE Soccer competition for August 2007 at the Panasonic Center facility in Tokyo.
- ROBO-ONE auto: Autonomous Biped Robot Fight Tournament (Feb 25, 2017) .

== Specifications ==
Early ROBO-ONE specifications were deliberately minimal to encourage as much participation as possible. As the robots' performance has improved, the specifications have been tightened to keep the focus on 'humanoid robotics'. For example, the foot/sole size in relation to the robots overall size has been incrementally decreased for recent competitions.

With ROBO-ONE 11 (March 2007), the concept of weight classifications was introduced.

== Rules ==
Competition rules vary based on the specific event, and have evolved over time as the robots ability has improved. The ROBO-ONE committee publishes the official rules in Japanese for each competition roughly two months in advance.

ROBO-ONE type competitions in other countries typically follow the same general format and rules, but with modifications appropriate for the participants skill and ability levels.

== Robo-One Kits ==
Competition level ROBO-ONE entries are typically custom designs, but have often been based in part on commercially available kits.

- Robotis Bioloid
- KHR-1, KHR-2 and KHR-3HV by Kondo Kagaku
- Robonova-1 by Hitec
- Manoi AT01 and Manoi PF01 by Kyosho
