= Pioneers in Engineering =

Berkeley, CA NGO

- Abbreviation: PiE
- Formation: 2008
- Type: NGO
- Purpose: Academic development
- Headquarters: O'Brien Hall, University of California, Berkeley
- Location: Berkeley, California
- Coordinates: 37.871766°N 122.26080819°W
- Region served: San Francisco Bay Area
- Parent organization: Tau Beta Pi
- Staff: 40
- Website: pioneers.berkeley.edu

Pioneers in Engineering (PiE) is a student-run organization that promotes the study of science, technology, engineering, and mathematics, collectively known as STEM fields. The organization was established in 2008 as a non-profit corporation by University of California, Berkeley student, Xiao-Yu Fu. The organization provides training and mentorship opportunities for local high school students to improve their technological skills, by participating in a robotics competition, during which each student team designs, builds, and programs functional robots. Since 2008, over 20 schools have participated in the program.

== Background ==
Pioneers in Engineering was founded in 2008 by University of California, Berkeley student and Tau Beta Pi member, Xiao-Yu Fu. The organization's office is in UC Berkeley's O'Brien Hall. Staff members, including University of California undergraduates and graduates, design and assemble robotics starter kits for the competition, develop mentors for the program, plan and manufacture the annual competition field, and oversee public relations and internal communications. As of 2026, the organization has expanded to include 40 staff members.

In preparation for the annual competition, robotic kits are distributed to groups of high schools students, who are paired with undergraduate mentors who assist the teams during the competition. A final tournament is held at the end of the season, allowing the student teams to reveal their work, for which awards are presented.
