= Robot-sumo =

Type of robot combat

Robot-sumo (Japanese: ロボット相撲) is an engineering and robotics competition in which two robots attempt to push each other out of a circular arena, in a similar fashion to the sport of sumo. The robots used in this competition are called "sumo robots", "sumobots" or simply "sumos".

Competitions typically involve autonomously operated wheeled mobile robots. The engineering challenges are for the robot to find its opponent (usually accomplished with infrared or ultra-sonic sensors) and to push it out of the dohyō. A robot should also avoid leaving the arena, usually by means of a sensor that detects the edge. The most common mechanical design is to use a wedge with a blade at the front to lift the opposing robot and push it more easily.

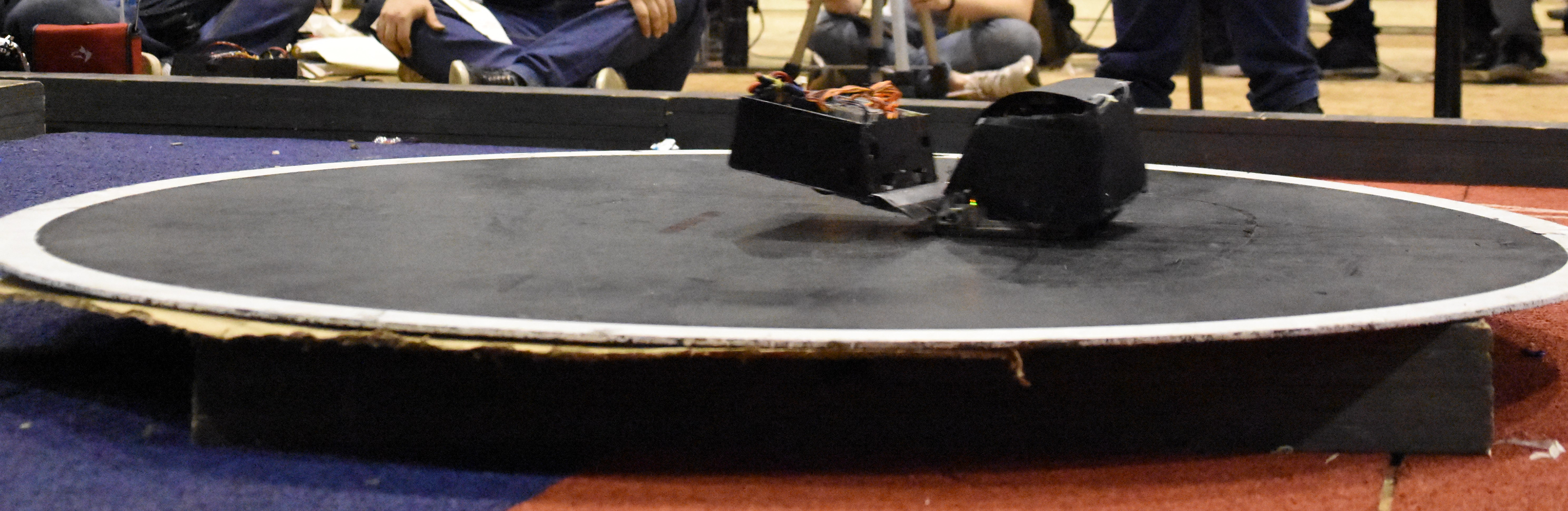
Robot-sumo (Mega Sumo) match in Brazil. Note the robot on the left being lifted by the opponent's wedge after a direct head-on collision.

Robot-Sumo originated in Japan in 1989 when FUJISOFT Inc. [jp] organized an experimental robot-sumo tournament, which would later be established as the All Japan Robot Sumo Tournament [jp](Japanese: 全日本ロボット相撲大会 zen'nippon robotto sumou taikai). Since 1998, FUJISOFT has collaborated with more than 30 countries, and robot-sumo has spread and has been one of the most popular robotics competitions in the world, such as in Europe, Mexico and Brazil, with a total of 80,000 people around the world actively developing sumo robots.

The All Japan Robot-Sumo Tournament has been hailed as the "World Robot-Sumo Championship". In August 2026, however, FUJISOFT announced that it would cease organizing the event, with the 2026 edition being the final tournament.

Robot-sumo competitions still hold amateur status, though high-performance competitions (events contested between technical students, universitarians and graduated engineers hobbyists) require highly complex engineering projects.

Robot-sumo is also often used as an educational tool of engineering, robotics and electronics for simpler protoypes in schools and undergraduate levels. Sumo robots design has also been the subject of studies and research of academic nature as well.

== History ==
Robot-Sumo began in Japan with the All Japan Robot Sumo Tournament [jp] organized by FUJISOFT Inc. [jp] for the first time in 1989 as an experimental tournament, with 33 participants. The first official edition was established in 1990, and, since then, this tournament has been held annually in Tokyo. The competition began with an idea from the president of FUJISOFT Inc., Hiroshi Nozawa, whose goal was to promote his company and recruit excellent human resources. But above all, it was because of his desire to give a dream to the younger people who are responsible for the future of his country, and because of the desire to create an environment to improve the quality of "Monozukuri" in Japan. Initially, Robot Sumo only included the class that would be later known as Mega Sumo or Sumo 3 kg class.

In 1992, the FUJISOFT tournament was held at the Ryōgoku Kokugikan, where the tournament is still held today. In 1998, the tournament had 2,929 participants.

Also in 1998, the first Robot-Sumo competition was held outside of Japan, at the ROBOlympics (later renamed RoboGames), one of the largest robotics events at the time, held in the USA. This event helped popularize sumo competitions around the world and led to the creation of categories derived from 3 kg class, such as Mini Sumo (500g class), LEGO Sumo, among others, which further popularized the category as a whole, leading to the emergence of many competitions around the world, such as in Mexico, Europe, and South America. The exact origin of those derived robot-sumo classes is uncertain, however there are footage of Mini Sumo RC from 2002 at the RoboGames.

In 2004, at the 15th edition of the All Japan Robot-Sumo Tournament, the tournament introduced the 10 kg class, but it would be discontinued in 2007.

In 2008, RoboCore organized the first official national robot-sumo tournament in Brazil as part of the expansion of the national robotics competition "Winter Challenge", originally a robot combat focused event mainly contested by universitarian teams from the country. In this competition, Sumo 3 kg Auto, Sumo 3 kg RC and Sumo LEGO classes were held. Until 2019, the Winter or Summer Challenge was the biggest robotics event in Brazil and Latin America, considered the "Brazilian National Robotics Championship" by many.

Also in 2008, with the increasing worldwide popularity of robot-sumo, FUJISOFT held for the first time an edition of the All Japan Robot-Sumo Tournament with international competitors, from United States, Mexico and Singapore. Since then, the All Japan became a world championship, with the participation of overseas competitors as “Overseas Representatives”.

In 2010, the Robochallenge, in Romania, hosted a robot-sumo event for the first time.

In 2013, FUJISOFT held the first official edition of the International Robot-Sumo Tournament (Note: Originally the "International Robot-Sumo Tournament 2013" was considered a test event, and was originally called the "International Robot-Sumo Pre-Tournament 2013". Currently, It is listed as part of the International Robot-Sumo Tournament without the status of a "test event".) (Japanese: 世界大会 sekai taikai), separating from the Japanese national All Japan competition (Japanese: 全国大会 zenkoku taikai), with only the best Japanese (champions, and later runners-up) advancing to the world tournament, with both tournaments being held in the same day, in sequence. In this edition, tournament champions or national representatives from Austria, USA, Baltic States (Estonia, Latvia and Lithuania), Turkey, Mexico and Ecuador participated as overseas representatives. The Auto tournament had 16 robots, and the RC tournament, 8 robots, in 2013.

Between 2013 and 2017, without a massive number of Japanese robots (and with a higher number of non-Japanese robots, with some editions reaching more than 100 robots in a single class), non-Japanese international competitors achieved greater results in the International Tournament. European teams achieved significant results in the 3 kg Auto class, including top places and championship titles. In 2017, the last edition of the International Robot-Sumo Tournament was marked by Mexican dominance in the Mega Sumo RC class, taking the first three positions and ahead of the Japanese champions.

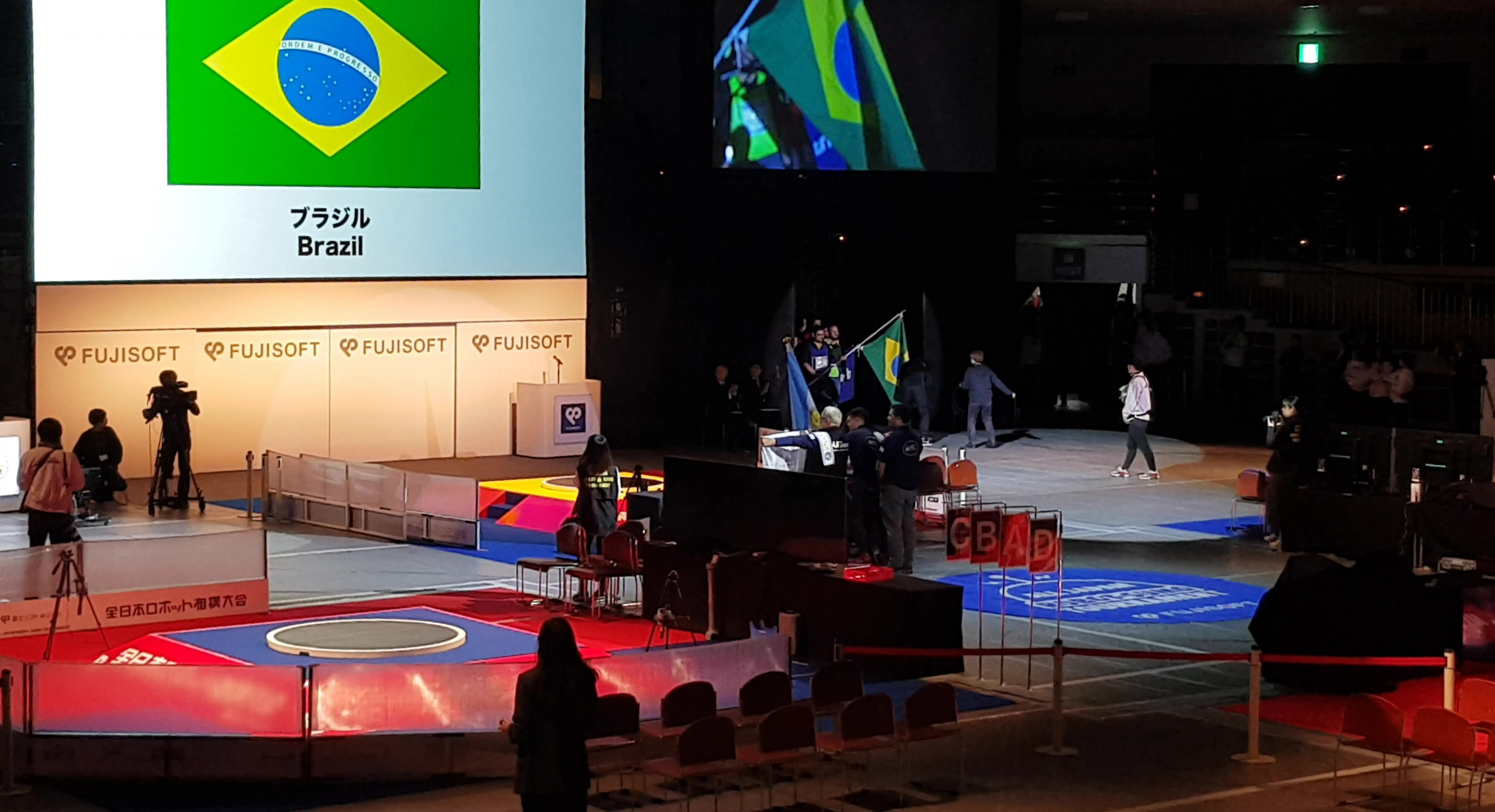
Parade of Nations in the All Japan Robot-Sumo Tournament 2019

In 2018, FUJISOFT reunified the Japanese All Japan competition with the International Tournament into a single tournament, as it was before 2013, retaining the All Japan Robot-Sumo Tournament name and labeling the final stage as the "Grand Final". In 2019, the competition was in its 31st edition, and had the participation of more than 20 countries, 104 autonomous robots and 78 radio-controlled robots in the Grand Final. With the competition unified again, robots from Japan once again dominated the top positions of the competition in 2018 and 2019.

In 2019, FUJISOFT also organized the first Mini-Sumo event in Japan, as a test event (called pre-tournament) in All Japan, only for Auto category.

In 2020, due to the COVID-19 pandemic in Japan, the 2020 edition (32nd edition) of the All Japan Robot-Sumo Tournament was cancelled.

In Brazil, due to the COVID-19 pandemic, competitions were also canceled. In response, many teams began organizing remote competitions, in which participants controlled ready-made prototypes provided by the organization remotely through the internet. For the Robot Sumo category, the most popular was the Remote Mini Sumo RC class, in which participants controlled ready-made robots just like in a conventional competition, but remotely through the internet with a mobile phone application. These competitions attracted not only Brazilian competitors, but also international competitors such as Argentines and Indians.

In 2021 and 2022, FUJISOFT organized an alternative competition for the 32nd and 33rd editions remotely for high school competitors (Japanese: 高校学校 koukougakkou), which consisted of a sumo robot design contest.

In 2022, RoboCore from Brazil remodeled its main and largest robotics competition, the "Winter Challenge", into the "RoboCore Experience" (RCX), the largest robot combat event in Latin America. The competition hosts the Mega Sumo, Mini Sumo and LEGO Sumo tournaments, jointly with the Robot Combat, Line Follower, Robot Hockey, Robot Trekking, ArtBot and Robot Soccer competitions. The RoboCore Experience is held together with Campus Party Brazil. The 2023 RCX had 1330 registered competitors and almost 700 robots in all robotics categories.

In 2022, with the end of the COVID-19 pandemic, FUJISOFT once again organized the All Japan Robot-Sumo Tournament (34th edition), but only for local competitors. In the same event, a new pre-tournament for Mini Sumo class was organized by FUJISOFT.

In 2023, All Japan, in its 35th edition, returned qualifying participants from overseas competitions for Mega Sumo class, for the first time since 2019. This year, the Mini Sumo tournament was officially added to the All Japan, but only for Japanese competitors.

In 2024, the robot Senju, from the Sumozade-Era Robotics team from Turkey, became the first non-Japanese Mega Sumo champion of the All Japan Robot-Sumo Tournament since the reunification in 2018, winning in the Auto category. Also in 2024, the Mini Sumo of All Japan started qualifying overseas competitors as well. Brazilian teams achieved great success, making the Mini Sumo Auto final, and also taking 2nd and 3rd places in Mini Sumo RC in that year, with the first place being notably won by a Mexican team. .

In April 2025, FUJISOFT announced that they "will primarily concentrate on the 500g class robots and will reduce participation in the 3kg class for both international and domestic teams", shifting the focus of the All Japan Robot-Sumo Tournament 2025 edition from the Mega Sumo class to the Mini Sumo class. They also announced that "in the future, country representative invitations may not be sent; only teams recognized in official tournaments will qualify for the Grand Final". In June 2025, FUJISOFT announced that the 2025 edition will host the Mini Sumo as an official tournament, rather than a Pre-Tournament as it has been until last year.

In August 2026, FUJISOFT announced that it would end the tournament after the 38th edition, stating that it had fulfilled a certain role as a social contribution initiative based on its activities to date. The 38th edition, scheduled for 2026, will therefore be the final tournament.

== Rules and Classes ==
The principle of a robot-sumo fight consists of two robots competing to push the opponent out of the dohyō. The arena is usually painted with a main color with a contrasting color used to paint a line in the edge (usually, black as the main color and white as the border line color).

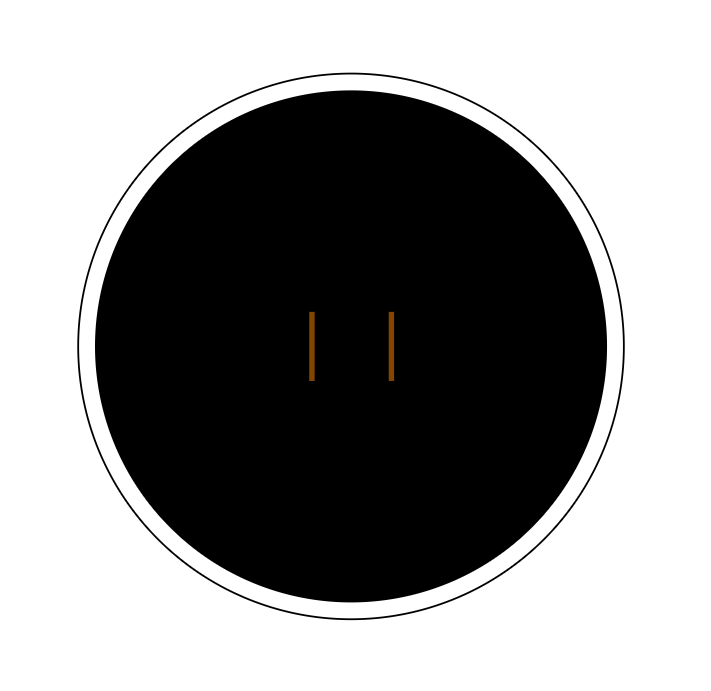
A sketch of a typical robot-sumo arena/dohyō from the All Japan Tournament. The brown lines in the center are called shikiri-sen ( 仕切り線) and limit the robots initial positioning.

Robot-sumo is usually divided in Autonomous (Auto) category, for robots that operate autonomously, and Radio-controlled (RC) category, for robots operated by a person.

In general, the rules may vary in some details from tournament to tournament (arena specifications, starting positioning, handling of exceptions, ...) especially in tournaments of a more educational nature, held in educational institutions as a didactic activity. High level competitions tend to follow standardized rules, such as the rules from All Japan Robot Sumo Tournament [jp].

For example, in FUJISOFT tournaments, matches are typically a series of 3 rounds, with the winner being the one who gets the most round wins. A round usually consists of (1) Positioning, (2) Preparation, and (3) Fight proper. In initial Positioning, a judge signals each operator to position each robot at the same time within the competition's permitted positioning limits. The judge then allows each operator to Prepare to select routines and strategies (in the case of the Auto category) or prepare the remote control (in the case of the RC category). To begin the Fight proper, the judge signals the start of the round according to the competition rules, and the winner of the round is the robot that pushes the opponent out of the arena. In the All Japan Robot Sumo Tournament [jp], the judge, at the start of a fight, usually announces "Hakkeyoi nokotta" (はっきよい 残った), which can be imprecisely translated as "Ready? Go!".

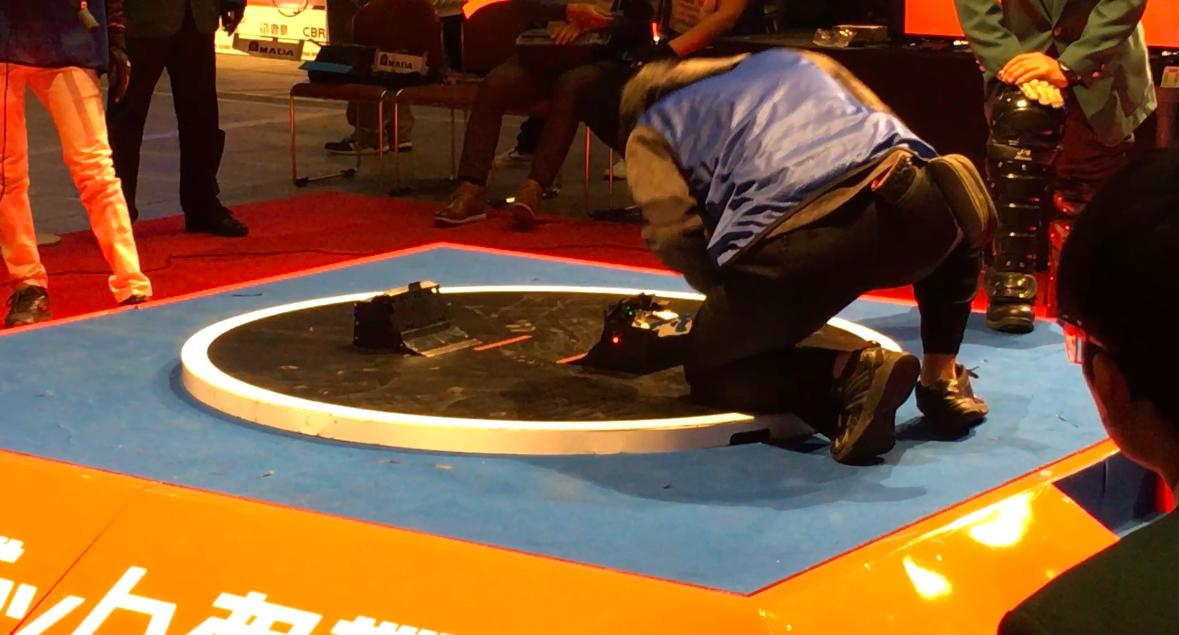
Competitors preparing the robots before a Mega Sumo fight at All Japan Robot-Sumo Tournament 2018

FUJISOFT also requires the usage of a standardized remote controller for the judge in Autonomous category in the All Japan Robot Sumo Tournament [jp] and in its qualifiers Overseas Tournaments, so the judge may control the start and the stop of the robots' movements. This remote controller uses infrared light with the following specifications: wavelength of 950 nm, service frequency: 38–40 kHz, and any Sony brand remote control can be used for the signal. The activation process works with 3 states: Key 1: Ready; Key 2: Start; Key 3: Stop.

Competitions are usually divided into different weight and size classes. The main standardized classes adopted worldwide are Mega Sumo, which is the original robot-sumo class, and Mini Sumo, the most popular variant. Though classes have size limits, robots are usually allowed to expand once the fight starts.

=== Mega Sumo ===
Mega Sumo or Sumo 3 kg class, also called Standard Class, or simply Robot-Sumo, is the original class created by FUJISOFT. It is currently the most important class and considered the main event of robot sumo competitions.

In this class, robots are limited in weight to 3 kg and in dimensions to 20 cm x 20 cm, with no height limit. Once the fight starts, the robot is allowed to expand its dimensions.

In this class, the dohyō should ideally be a 5 cm in height circular aluminum structure with a diameter of 154 cm (+/- 50 mm), including the border line, and covered by a black cold-rolled steel (SPCC) sheet located on top. The dohyō is made of steel, and the use of magnets is allowed to increase the interaction force between the robot and the arena. Because of this, many robots can achieve normal force values that surpass 100 kgf.

This class is usually divided in Mega Sumo Auto (Autonomous) and Mega Sumo RC (Radio-controlled).

=== Mini Sumo ===
In the Mini Sumo class (also called Sumo 500g class) robots have a weight limit of up to 500 g and are limited to 10 cm x 10 cm, with no height limit. Once the fight starts, the robot is allowed to expand its size.

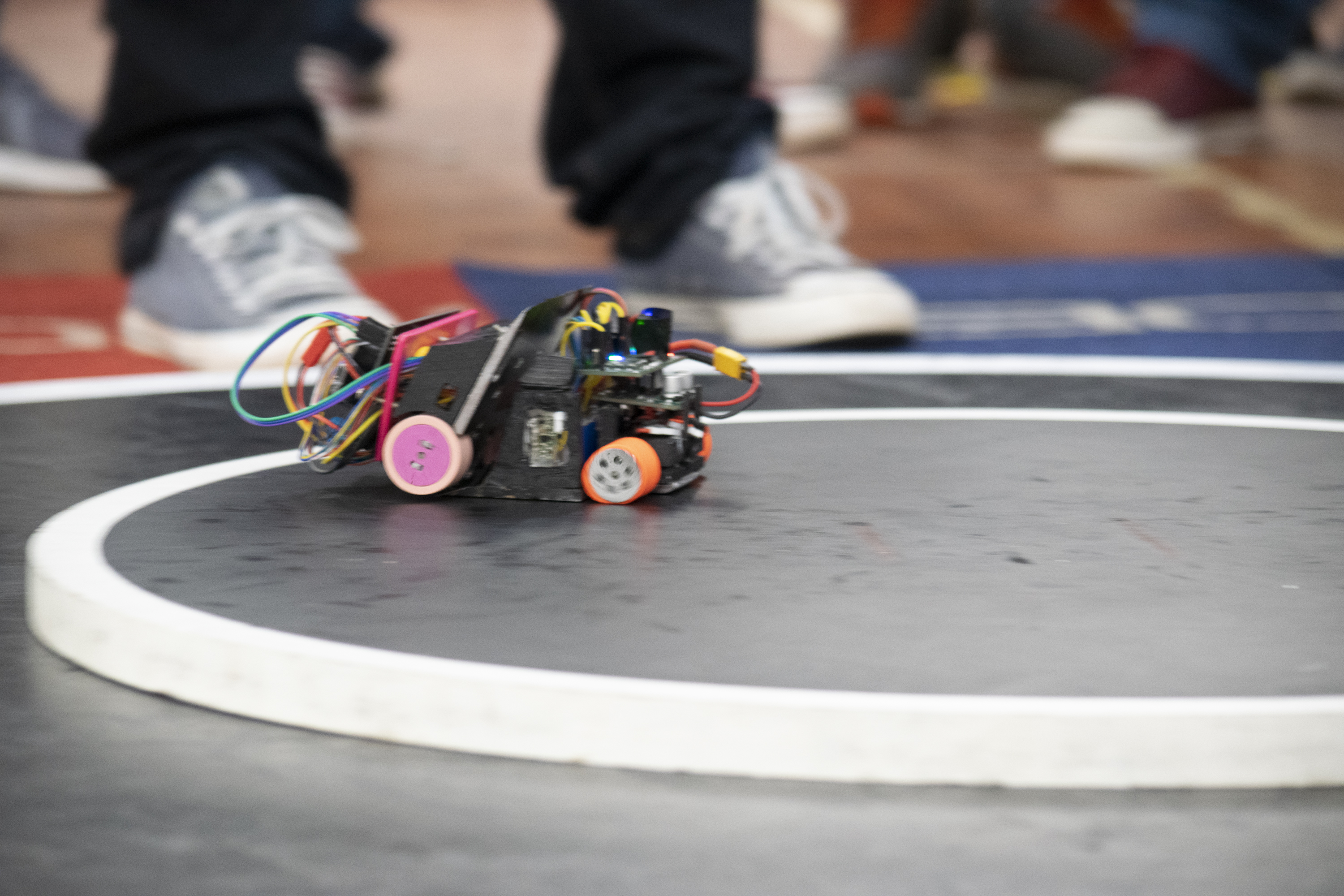
Mini Sumo match

The dohyō should be a 2.5 cm in height circular wooden board with a diameter of 77 cm (including the white border line), covered by a formica laminate located on top. The arena is made of wood, and therefore the robots are not affected by the force of magnets.

This class is also usually divided in Mini Sumo Auto (Autonomous) and Mini Sumo RC (Radio-controlled).

Since a Mini robot is more affordable than a 3 kg robot (due to material costs and manufacturing dimensions), it is a more popular class and often considered entry-level. Because of this, it has become the most popular robot sumo class in the world.

Not an original class from All Japan Robot-Sumo Tournament, the class was added to the tournament as a test event in 2019, and officially added in 2023, introducing mini sumo to Japanese builders.

=== Other Standard Classes ===
There are also other standardized classes in different competitions around the world.

- Sumo 10 kg class: up to 10 kg, dimensions of 30 cm x 30 cm, no height limit, steel arena. Class hosted between 2004 and 2007 by All Japan Robot-Sumo Tournament, but currently discontinued.
- Micro Sumo: up to 100 g, must fit in a 5 cm cube, wooden arena.
- Nano Sumo: up to 50 g, must fit in a 2.5 cm cube, wooden arena.
- LEGO Sumo: robots must be made entirely of Lego pieces, wooden arena.

The Micro and Nano classes are less popular than the Mini and Mega Sumo, but they are held at some relevant events such as RoboGames, RobotChallenge in China, and Robochallenge in Romania.

In the LEGO Sumo class, robots must be made entirely of Lego pieces. This class is widely used as an educational tool in schools for teaching robotics.

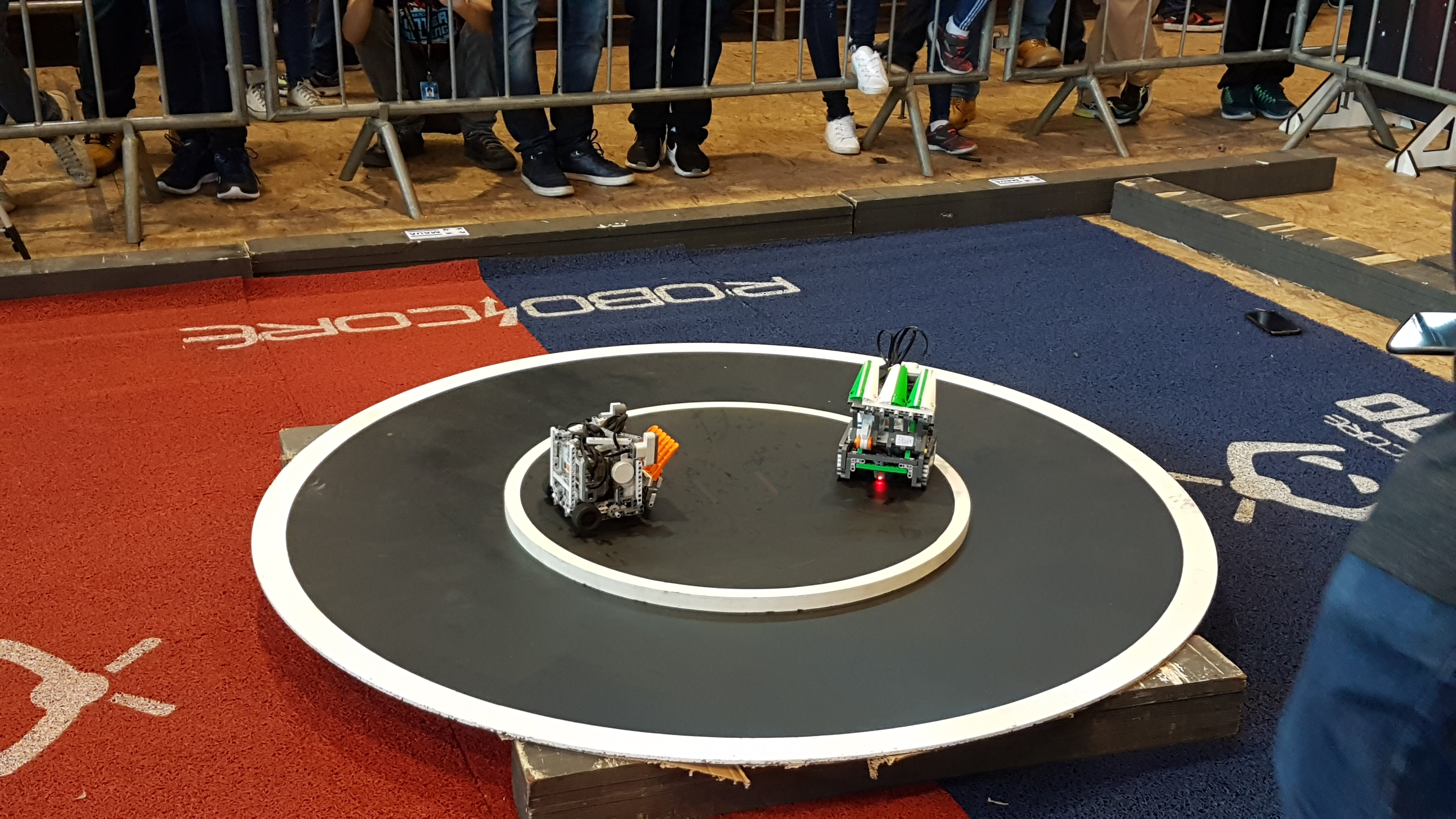
LEGO Sumo match

=== Minor Variants ===
Minor regional competitions might host their own classes as well. Internal competitions in schools might also create their own variants for didatic purposes.

There are also some robot-sumo events with humanoid robots.

==== Humanoid robot-sumo ====
Humanoid robot-sumo is similar to ROBO-ONE events. The robots are generally radio-controlled with some degree of autonomy. The mains robotics events with humanoid robot-sumo featured are the RoboGames, the chinese RobotChallenge, and the romanian Robochallenge.

Since this variant involves humanoid robots, it does not follow the same principles of design from the robot-sumo created by FUJISOFT for the All Japan Robot-Sumo Tournament. This category also does not have the same prestige as the wheeled standard robot-sumo classes, such as Mega Sumo and Mini Sumo.

== Robot design ==
Standard sumo robots resemble car-like robots, consisting of a chassis with wheels, and usually equipped with sensors, when with some level of autonomy. The use of mechanisms that physically damage the opposing robot is not usually permitted. For majority of the classes, mainly Mega Sumo and Mini Sumo, a robot design project is usually divided in three disciplines: Mechanics, Electronics, and Programming.

Competitors are encouraged to build their own robots, respecting each competition class' and security rules. In Sumo LEGO, in particular, only Lego pieces must be used to build the robot, mainly using Mindstorms NXT or Mindstorms EV3 robotics kits.

A lot of projects employs electronics components and mechanical parts sold in robotics stores. With the popularization of standardized robot-sumo competitions worldwide, mainly Mega Sumo and Mini Sumo, specialized robot-sumo parts stores appeared, such as JSumo and Sumozade, both based in Turkey, which even sell complete Mega Sumo and Mini Sumo robot kits.

=== Mechanics ===
The Mechanics consists in the infrastructure that supports and accommodates all the components and systems of the sumobot, including motors, wheels, PCB's, sensors, among others.

A standard sumo robot is wheeled driven robot with a locomotion system. The locomotion system usually consists of driving motors with a coupling system to the wheels, which usually employs a reduction drive system to shift the output speed. Brushed DC motors have been the most employed ones, but there are also robots with brushless DC motors. Motors from Maxon or Faulhaber brands have been popular choices among highest level competitors, such as robots in the All Japan Robot-Sumo Tournament.

Another commonly employed design for a sumo robot is an angled wedge/ramp in the front of the body. This wedge is usually coupled with a blade with the purpose of invading the opponent from below and lifting it, so it becomes easier to push it out of the arena.

For Mega Sumo robots, since magnets play an important role in the dynamics performance, the chassis are usually designed to support the desired number of magnets. A builder might choose between a heavier or a lighter robot based on the number of magnets allocated.

Some robot designs also employs peripheral mechanisms. Though classes have dimension limits, they are usually limited to the start of the fight, and once the fight starts, the robot is allowed to expand its size. Examples of these mechanisms are side flags and side wedges, which are usually activated with actuators other than the driving motors.

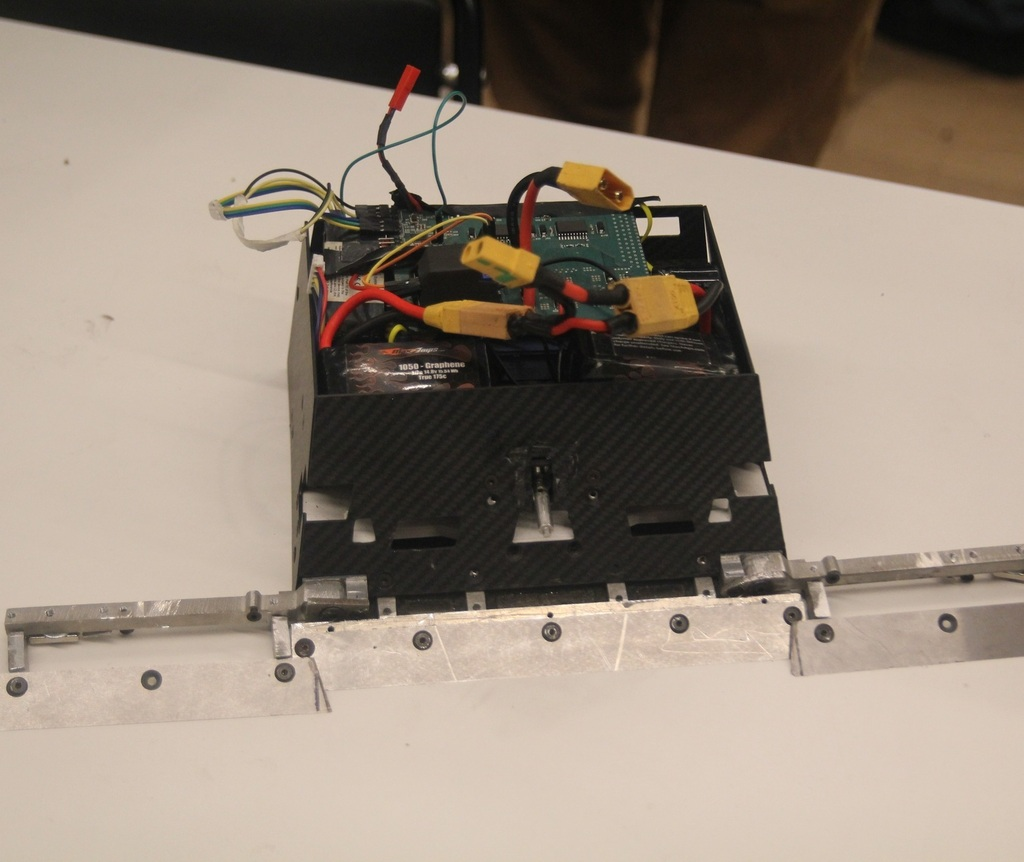
Mega Sumo Galena, from ThundeRatz [pt] (Poli-USP), is an example of robot with side blades.

=== Electronics ===
In a sumo robot, Electronics may be divided in two main functions: power supply and logic control. Sumo robots, in general, employ Lithium polymer batteries to supply energy to the motors and other electronic components.

Microcontrollers are mainly employed to receive data from sensors and send command to the motors and other actuators based on the programmed control logic. Microcontrollers are usually mounted with a designed PCB for the robot.

In Autonomous classes, infrared sensors or ultrasonic sensors are usually employed to detect the opponent. Sumos also employ sensors to detect the edge (border line), usually with phototransistor reflectance sensors.

In RC classes, the robots are remotely controlled by an operator. All Japan Robot-Sumo Tournament usually require radio controllers, so the robot hardware must be able to receive commands from the controller using a radio signal receiver module.

=== Programming ===
The Programming discipline is responsible for the embbeded control system, mainly in the autonomous classes. A robot-sumo firmware is responsible monitoring the sensors' data and for controlling the actuators, such as the driving motors.

The robot control system consists in setting the behaviour of the actuators (mainly the motors) based on the feedback of the sensors. Some usual control routines include setting a behaviour while no opponent is detected, such as randomly advancing through the dohyō, and a behaviour when an opponent is detected, such as pursuing it based on the feedback of the detection sensors.

== Tournaments ==
Currently, several Robot-Sumo tournaments are held around the world. Robot-sumo competitions range from simple didatic and educational tournaments within schools to the highest level engineering competitions between high school/university students, graduate engineers and hobbyists.

Competitors are usually organized into teams, consisting of the sumo robots themselves and the members responsible for their creation, operation and maintenance during the event. Robot-sumo tournaments still have amateur status (students and hobbyists), even though some teams from academic institutions might be guided or leaded by a professor from the institute, with this advisoring being commonly included as part of his academic activities.

Competitions adopt different competition formats, usually knockout bracket competitions, ranging from single elimination systems to tournaments with group stage or double elimination systems. Teams may register more than one robot per event, and confrontations between robots from the same team are possible.

As for the highest level competitions, Japan is the world's leading powerhouse in this category, and the All Japan Robot-Sumo Tournament is the most prestigious competition in the world, being considered as the "World Robot-Sumo Championship". Originally a tournament for Japan-based builders, FUJISOFT currently approves several tournaments around the world as certified overseas qualifiers for international competitors.

In Japan, a large portion of the top competitors come from school teams from secondary school, with tournaments being exclusively held for them. Furthermore, the high school regional qualifiers make up a significant portion of the Japanese slots for the All Japan Grand Final. In 2024, 66 of the 114 slots for Japanese competitors were reserved for high schooler's robots.

Also in Asia, there are also important competitions in China, such as the RobotChallenge, and in Mongolia.

In Europe, the RoboChallenge, in Romania, is the main european robot-sumo event, focused mainly on autonomous sumo. Baltic States also organize relevant competitions, such as Robotex.

In the Americas, the former RoboGames, the largest robotics competition in the world at the time, included several Sumo categories in its program, bringing together international competitors from all over the world. Mexico, one of the world powerhouses, especially in Mega Sumo RC and Mini Sumo, hosts several robot-sumo competitions. In Brazil, RoboCore hosts and sanctions the main robot competitions of the country, mainly for Robot Combat, but which usually include Robot-Sumo and other events such as Line Follower as well.

=== Japan ===
In Japan, Robot-Sumo is officially sanctioned by FUJISOFT Inc., which organizes the All Japan Robot-Sumo Tournament, the first robot-sumo competition, since 2008 the world's leading competition with robots from over 20 countries participating, and currently, considered as the "World Robot-Sumo Championship".

Robot-sumo in Japan is also particularly popular among students from the secondary school. There are two main tournaments for high schooler's builders: the High Schooler's Robot-Sumo Tournament, organized by the "National Association of Technical High School Principals", and the High School Robot-Sumo Championship, organized by AEON Mall, both with the support of FUJISOFT. Those tournaments are also qualifiers to the All Japan Tournament.

==== All Japan Robot-Sumo Tournament ====
All Japan Robot-Sumo Tournament 全日本ロボット相撲大会
Tournament information
- Game: Robot-Sumo: Mega Sumo (Auto and RC); Mini Sumo (Auto and RC)
- Established: 1989
- Defunct: 2026
- Administrator: FUJISOFT Inc.
- Format: Overseas Tournaments: Various Regional Stage: Single-elimination knockout system Grand Final: Single-elimination knockout system
- Venue(s): Overseas Tournaments: Various outside Japan Regional Stage: Various in Japan Grand Final: Ryōgoku Kokugikan, Sumida, Tokyo, Japan
- Broadcast: Youtube: https://www.youtube.com/@ROBO-SUMO/streams
- Website: https://www.fsi.co.jp/sumo/index.html

The All Japan Robot Sumo Tournament [jp] (Japanese: 全日本ロボット相撲大会 zen'nippon robotto sumou taikai), organized by FUJISOFT Inc. [jp], is the official national robot-sumo tournament of Japan. Founded in 1989, with the aim of promoting the enjoyment of manufacturing through robot building, the event is the first robot-sumo event ever, introducing the Mega Sumo class. Since the introduction of overseas participants in 2008, it is considered the "World Robot-Sumo Championship" for Mega Sumo, both Auto and RC. Since 2023, it has also been officially hosting Mini-Sumo competitions (Auto and RC).

In August 2026, FUJISOFT announced that it would end the tournament after the 38th edition, scheduled for 2026, which will therefore be the final tournament.

Currenlty, the competition is divided into a "Regional Stage" (Japanese: 地区大会 chiku taikai, lit: regional tournament) and the "Grand Final" (Japanese: 全国大会 zenkoku taikai, lit: all country tournament), also called "Final Round". The Regional Stage consists of regional tournaments held in Japan between August and October for participants based in Japan, with the top performers from each tournament qualifying for the Grand Final. The Regional Stage tournaments have usually been the Kantō, Chūgoku-Shikoku, Hokushin'etsu-Tōkai, Tōhoku, Hokkaidō, Kinki and Kyūshū tournaments, though not all of them may be held every edition. The Regional Stage tournaments currently adopt a single-elimination format and are held in a single day. The FUJISOFT's "High Schooler's Tournament" and the "High School Championship" Regional Stage tournaments are also part of regional qualifiers for the All Japan Grand Final.

International representatives may qualify for the Grand Final through international qualifiers tournaments approved by FUJISOFT, in overseas countries such as Mexico, Mongolia and Brazil, among others. These tournaments form the "Overseas Tournaments" qualifiers (Japanese: 海外大会枠 kaigai taikai-waku, lit: overseas tournaments slots). The Overseas Tournaments are run by different organizations, so the tournament format varies. In some specific cases, qualification certificates are also issued to some teams as "National Representative" or "Country Representative", for countries with no teams yet qualified or without any official qualifier tournament.

The following countries are listed as having already collaborated with All Japan Robot-Sumo Tournament, regarding participation in the tournament or other types of collaboration in robot-sumo:

- Africa: DR Congo, Egypt and Tunisia.
- Asia: China, Indonesia, Israel, Lebanon, Malaysia, Mongolia, Philippines, Saudi Arabia, Singapore and Thailand.
- Americas: Argentina, Brazil, Canada, Chile, Colombia, Ecuador, Mexico, Paraguay, Peru and the United States.
- Europe: Estonia, France, Latvia, Lithuania, Poland, Russia, Spain and Turkey.

The Grand Final is held in December in Tokyo, Japan at the Ryōgoku Kokugikan, and is held in two days, with the first day labeled "Qualification Session" and the final day as the "Grand Final Session" properly. The Grand Final is also a single-elimination knockout tournament.

Between 2013 and 2017, FUJISOFT split the All Japan Grand Final in the All Japan Tournament properly, which was reserved for Japanese competitors, and the "International Robot-Sumo Tournament", a tournament which functioned as the current Grand Final and a proper world championship in name, with the All Japan as the Japanese qualifier for the International (similar as other overseas tournaments). In 2018, FUJISOFT reunified the competition under the name All Japan Grand Final, which once again functioned as the de facto world championship tournament (even with the "All Japan" in name).

As of 2024, FUJISOFT initially reserved for the All Japan Grand Final, for each of Mega Sumo categories, Auto and RC, a total of 57 slots for the Regional Stage (including the "High Schooler's Tournament" and the "High School Championship" Regional Stage tournaments) and 40 slots for Overseas Tournaments. While all Japanese slots were filled, only 26 and 23 slots were filled by overseas representatives for Auto and RC, respectively. That edition had robots from 17 overseas countries qualified.

==== High Schooler's Robot-Sumo Tournament ====
The "National Association of Technical High School Principals" (Japanese:公益社団法人全国工業高等学校長協会 kōeki shadanhōjin zenkoku kōgyō kōtō gakkō chōkyōkai), with the support of FUJISOFT, organizes the "High Schooler's Robot-Sumo Tournament" (Japanese: 高校生ロボット相撲大会 kōkōsei robotto sumou taikai). The tournament is exclusive for robots developed by students from secondary education in Japan (equivalent to high school) held in parallel with the main All Japan Robot Sumo Tournament [jp]. Like the main All Japan, while initially a Mega Sumo tournament only, the event currently also hosts Mini Sumo tournaments.

The tournament also consists of Regional Stage tournaments and a Final tournament, with the Regional Stage tournament being usually held jointly with the All Japan Regional Stage tournaments in the same day, while the Final High Schooler's tournament is usually held separately and earlier, in a different venue. The tournaments also adopt single-elimination format, with the final tournament with 32 robots in each Mega Sumo Auto and RC categories.

The Regional Stage tournaments are also usual qualifiers for the main All Japan Robot-Sumo Tournament Grand Final.

==== High School Robot-Sumo Championship ====
AEON Mall, with the support of FUJISOFT, organizes the "High School Robot-Sumo Championship" (Japanese: 高等学校ロボット相撲選手権 kōtō gakkō robotto sumou senshuken), which is also exclusive to students from secondary education. Initially a Mega Sumo tournament, the event currently also hosts Mini Sumo class tournaments.

The tournament consists of Regional Stage tournaments only, hosted in AEON Mall shopping centres from each host region. As of the 2025 edition, the regional tournaments were: Kyūshū-Okinawa, Tōkai, Kantō, Kinki, Chūgoku-Shikoku and Hokkaidō-Tōhoku tournaments.

These Regional Stage tournaments are also usual qualifiers for the main All Japan Robot Sumo Tournament [jp] Grand Final.

=== Brazil ===
Widely known for robot combat competitions, robot-sumo was introduced in Brazil by RoboCore in 2008 and has attained increasing attention in the country from 2017 onwards, mainly from teams from the top universities of the country. Robot-Sumo has been added to the main robotics competitions contested by teams of engineering and technology students from institutes at Technical and mainly at Higher Education levels. Since these teams are mostly students organizations/clubs or research groups, the rotation of members tend to be high, since every year new freshmen get into the school/university, and senior members tend to leave the group after graduation. These teams usually have a professor from the institute as an advisor, who may contribute for the robots development directly, or be just a representative for internal bureaucracy.

The robotics teams from the Polytechnic School of the University of São Paulo (Poli-USP), with their team named "ThundeRatz" [pt], Instituto Mauá de Tecnologia, with their team named "Kimauánisso", and Federal University of Rio de Janeiro (UFRJ), with their team named "Minervabots", are among the most prominent and successful robot-sumo teams in the country.

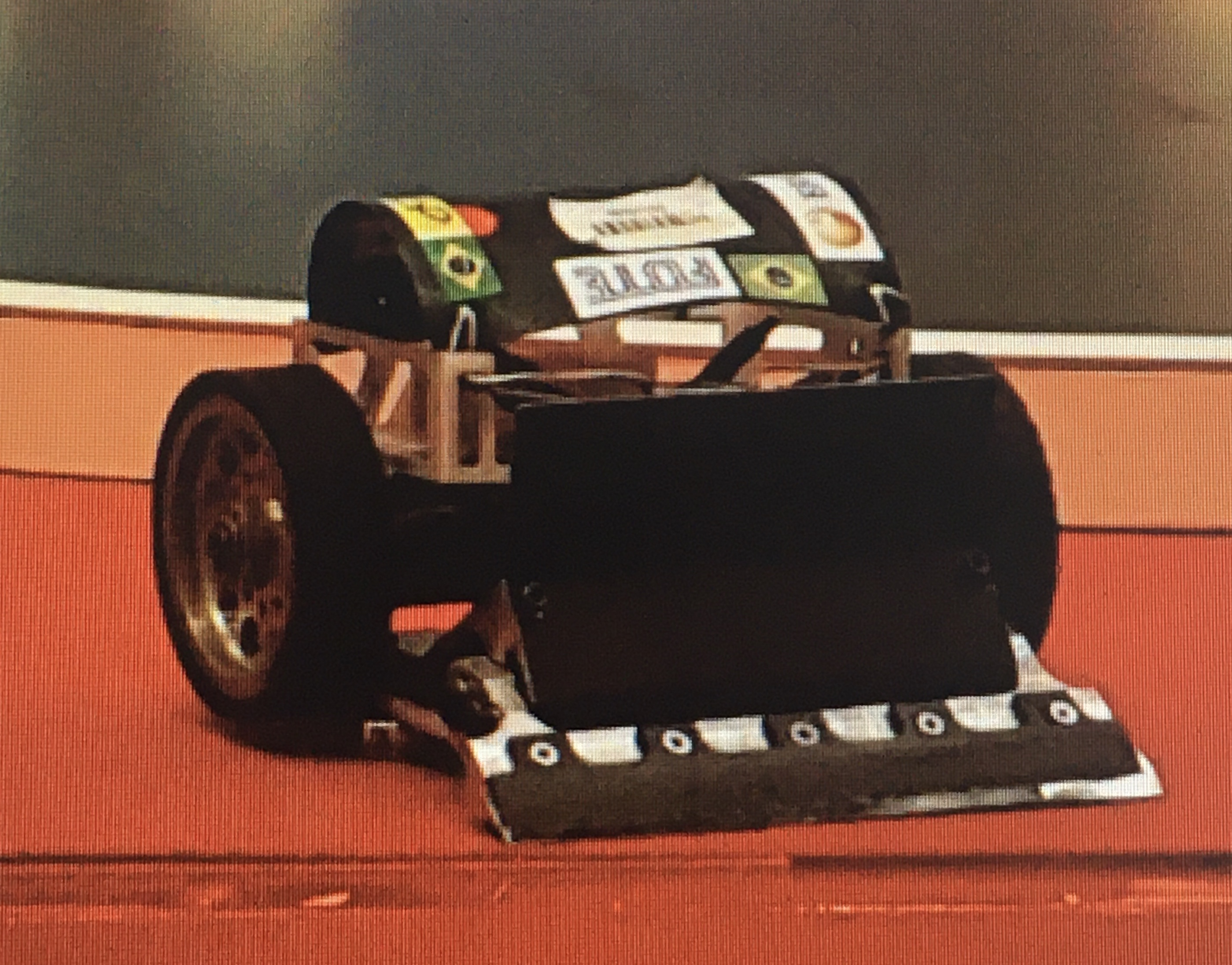
Stonehenge, former Mega Sumo RC developed by ThundeRatz [pt]. Though untypical worldwide, its design was heavily copied by rival teams in Brazil during its active years (2012-2020). As of the IRONCup 2025, it was still the biggest Sumo 3kg RC RoboCore champion and the leader of the History Ranking.

These competitions are also open to teams not directly linked with academic institutions, including independent teams of hobbyists, graduated engineers and professionals. These teams are often made up of former students from those academic institutions teams.

Furthermore, international participants, from countries such as Ecuador, France, Mexico, Paraguay and Poland, have already participated. Participants from Mexico, one of the robot-sumo world powerhouses, have achieved great success in competitions in Brazil, mainly in Mini Sumo.

==== RoboCore ====
RoboCore is an online store, developer and manufacturer of boards and kits in Brazil and an organizer of robotics events. RoboCore organizes and supports a number of robotics competitions in Brazil, including in its program Robot Combat, Line Follower, Robot Trekking and Robot-Sumo events, attracting mainly universitarian and technical education level teams. The current major RoboCore robotics competition in general is the RoboCore Experience (RCX, and former Winter/Summer Challenge), the largest robot combat competition in Latin America, currently held with Campus Party Brasil.

Currently, the annual calendar competitions from RoboCore with robot-sumo added to their program are the following:

- RoboCore Experience (RCX): organized by RoboCore, currently held with Campus Party Brasil. It is usually held at the São Paulo - SP edition, which is usually held in July, but it may be hosted in other editions.
- IRONCup: organized by Inatel and sanctioned by RoboCore, held at Santa Rita do Sapucaí - MG, usually around February/March.
- RSM Challenge: organized by Instituto RSM and sanctioned by RoboCore, held at Mogi das Cruzes - SP, in the Greater São Paulo, usually around April/May.
- RoboChallenge Brasil: organized by Instituto Mauá de Tecnologia and sanctioned by RoboCore, held at São Caetano do Sul - SP, in the Greater São Paulo, usually in October.

The robot-sumo competitions organized or supported by RoboCore are among the most prestigious in the country. RoboCore Experience is the major robotics event in Brazil and considered by many as the brazilian robotics "National Championship". However, the IRONCup, the RSM Challenge and the RoboChallenge Brasil have also become prominent competitions due to their relevance to the brazilian robot-sumo scenario. The RSM has also become prominent as a major international tournament, gathering robots from Latin America countries, such as Mexico, Ecuador, Colombia and so on. Besides these events, some special and once a time competitions might be organized as well.

The classes usually included in RoboCore tournaments program are Sumo 3 kg (Mega Sumo) Auto and RC, Mini Sumo Auto and RC and LEGO Sumo. In addition, there is usually a separate LEGO Sumo class exclusively for teams formed by elementary and high school students, the LEGO Sumo Junior.

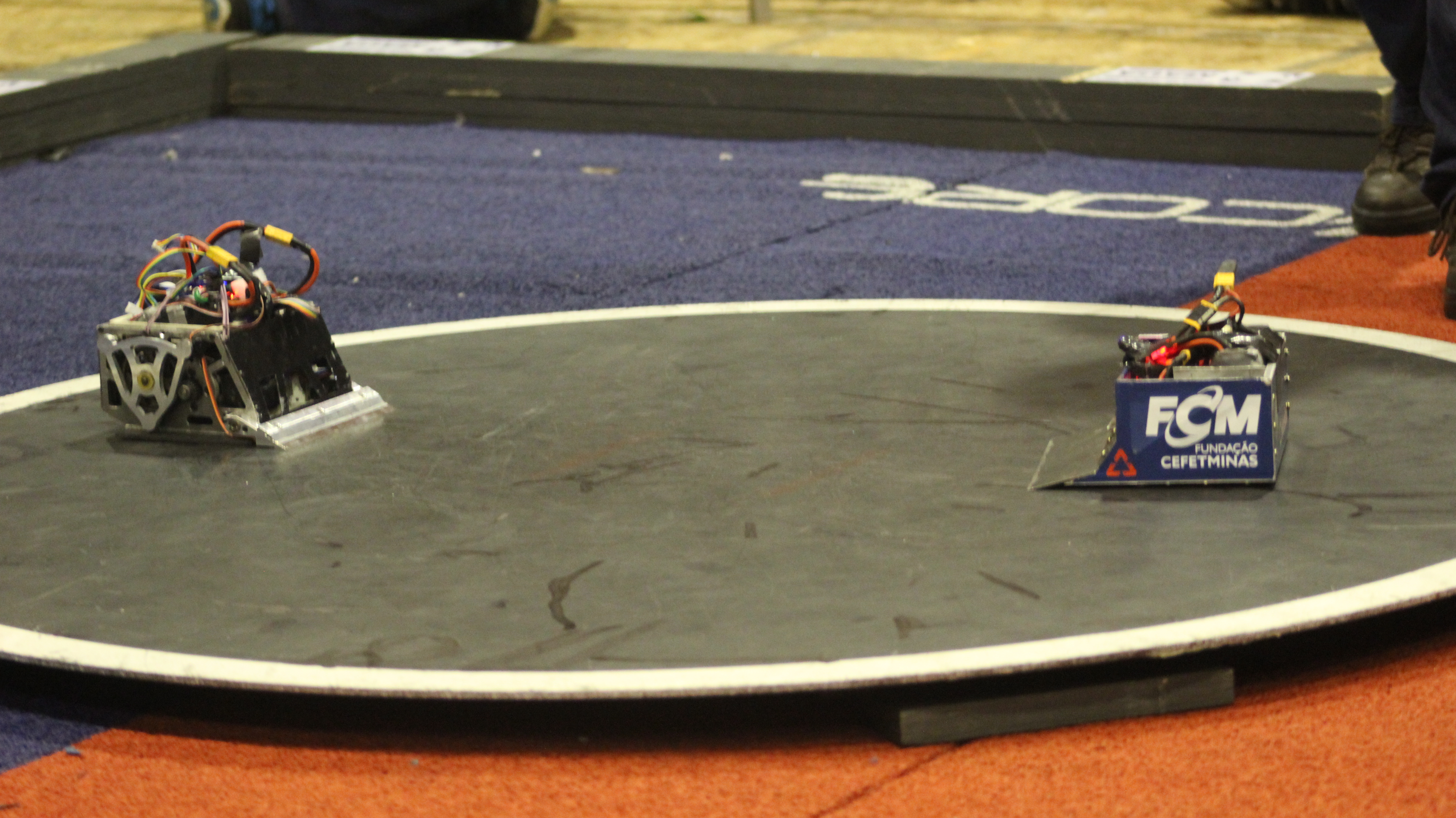
Mega Sumo (Sumo 3kg) match between Poli-USP (in the left) and CEFET-MG (in the right) at the RoboCore Winter Challenge 2017

RoboCore tournaments usually adopt the double-elimination knockout system, in which there is a main bracket (called the "winners' bracket") and a secondary bracket of robots transferred after losing a match in the main bracket (called the "losers' bracket"). Robots that lose in the losers bracket are eliminated from the tournament. The tournament final consists of the winner of the winners' bracket competing against the remaining robot from the losers' bracket. Robot-sumo tournaments from RoboCore usually adopt a "double final" format, in which the robot coming from the losers' bracket must win two matches of the final to become the tournament champion, while the robot coming from the winners' bracket must win only one match. This is due to the principle that for a robot to be eliminated, it must suffer two defeats in the event.

RoboCore calendar robot-sumo events (RCX, IRONCup, RSM Challenge and Robochallenge) have been usually approved by FUJISOFT as "Overseas Tournaments" qualifiers for the All Japan Robot Sumo Tournament [jp] in the Mega Sumo and Mini Sumo classes. Thus, these competitions are the main qualification path for teams based in Brazil.

RoboCore also organizes the "RoboCore's Robot History Ranking", a historical ranking of registered and participant robots in RoboCore tournaments, including those in the robot-sumo classes. The system is based on the Elo system that calculates the relative strength between opponents based on the result of each confrontation. The RoboCore system adopts an initial score of 1200, but does not exclude inactive robots from the ranking. Since the system is tied to a registered robot, then the ranking is compiled exclusively for each instance registered in the system (this means if a robot is registered with different labels for different tournaments, the ranking will be compiled for each label, as different robots). For robot-sumo, the RoboCore ranking is compiled for the major classes in Brazil: Sumo 3 kg Auto, 3 kg RC, Mini Auto, Mini RC, LEGO and LEGO Jr., but also for minor classes, such as the remote classes, popular during the COVID-19 pandemic.

==== Other tournaments in Brazil ====
Though RoboCore organizes and sanctions a number of events, most of them are hosted in the Southeast region of Brazil, mainly in the São Paulo state. Different academic institutions have also been organizing regional tournaments, mainly in the Northeast and South regions of Brazil.

From 2017 until 2021, Instituto Mauá also organized additional tournaments in São Paulo state in partnership with SESC, from Santo André in the Greater São Paulo, and with Bosch Brazil in Campinas - SP. These tournaments were also added as Overseas Tournament qualifiers for the All Japan Robot-Sumo Tournament.

=== China ===
China hosts the RobotChallenge.

==== RobotChallenge ====
The RobotChallenge is "one of the world’s largest artificial intelligent robotic championships" and had the participation of more than 80 countries through the years. The competitions hosts a number of robotics competition such as Air Race, Line Follower, Humanoid Sprint and RoboSumo (Robot-Sumo).

For Robot-sumo, the competition organizes tournaments for Mega Sumo, Mini Sumo, Micro Sumo, Nano Sumo and Lego Sumo classes. There is also a special class for Humanoid Sumo.

RobotChallenge is also a usual Overseas Tournament qualifier for the All Japan Robot-Sumo Tournament.

=== Mexico ===
Mexico hosts a number of robot-sumo events. The prominent ones are usual approved Overseas Tournaments qualifiers for the All Japan Robot-Sumo Tournament.

=== Mongolia ===
Mongolia hosts a number of robot-sumo events. The prominent ones are usual approved Overseas Tournaments qualifiers for the All Japan Robot-Sumo Tournament.

=== Romania ===
Romania hosts the Robochallenge.

==== Robochallenge ====
Robochallenge was first organized in 2008, and initially called ROBOT FOTBAL, hosting a Robot Football competition. It currently organizes tournaments of Line Follower, Robot Football, Maze, Robot Combat and Robot-Sumo, among others. The competition is held at Politehnica of Bucharest.

As of 2024, the robot-sumo classes hosted by Robochallenge Romania are Mega Sumo, Mini Sumo, Micro Sumo, Nano Sumo. It also organizes a Humanoid Sumo competition.

Robochallenge is an also usual Overseas Tournament qualifier for the All Japan Robot-Sumo Tournament.

=== United States ===
The RoboGames is held in the USA, which was, until 2016, the largest open robotics competition in the world.

==== RoboGames ====
RoboGames is an international robot event contested annually in the USA. The events are divided in categories: Humanoids; Auton. Humanoid Challenges; Combat; Robot Soccer; Open; Jr League; Autonomous Autos; Art Bots; BEAM, and Sumo. It hosted the first robot-sumo event outside Japan, in 1998.

As of 2024, RoboGames opened registrations for the following robot-sumo events: Nano 25g (auton), Micro 100g (auton), Mini 500g (auton), Mini 500g (junior class), 1 kg (kit-auton), Mega 3 kg (R/C), Mega 3 kg (auton), 4 kg (Humanoid).

RoboGames is an also usual Overseas Tournament qualifier for the All Japan Robot-Sumo Tournament.

== In the media ==
The popular internet meme "Omae wa mou shindeiru" (お前はもう死んでいる, English: You are already dead), from Japanese manga series Fist of the North Star, has been adapted to robot-sumo fight videos and became viral. A video uploaded on YouTube in 2017 by the user "Sh0gun", named "*teleports behind you*", has gathered more than 63 million visualizations.

In 2018, Japanese robot-sumo has been the subject of a short video from Great Big Story named "The Freakishly Fast World of Robot Sumo" released on YouTube.

Since 2019, FUJISOFT has been live transmitting the Regional Stage and the Grand Final tournaments of All Japan Robot-Sumo Tournament on a dedicated Youtube channel.

== See also ==
- Robotics
- Robot competition
- Robot Combat, a related robot competition
- Sumo, the traditional Japanese martial art that inspired robot-sumo
