= Beijing E-Town Half-Marathon =

Road race with robots

- Date: April
- Location: Beijing, China
- Event type: Road
- Distance: Half-marathon: 21.0975 kilometres (13.1094 mi)
- Primary sponsor: Beijing E-Town
- Established: 2025
- Course records: 50:26 minutes by Honor Lightning (2026)
- Website: Beijing E-Town Half-Marathon
- Participants: 2026 starters: 12,000+ humans, 300+ robots

The Beijing E-Town Half-Marathon (Chinese: 北京亦庄半程马拉松) is an annual half-marathon held in Beijing and organized by Beijing E-Town. It features a parallel race for humanoid robots alongside human runners. At the inaugural event in 2025, there were few robot competitors with a total of 21 robots from teams nationwide, and their performance was inadequate, with only one finishing within the 3 hour 10 minute time limit. In 2026, there were over 300 robots, and the best surpassed the human field of more than 12,000 runners, beating the human world record by about 7 minutes.

== 2025 ==
The first race was held on 19 April 2025, after being postponed by six days due to strong winds. Although around 12,000 human participants took part, only 21 humanoid robots competed. Most of the robots performed poorly, with many overheating and falling during the race. All required human assistance from their trainers, including control guidance, battery replacements, cooling sprays, and even duct tape repairs.

Only six robots managed to finish the course. The winning robot was Tiangong Ultra, from the Beijing Humanoid Robot Innovation Center, with a time of 2 hours and 40 minutes, compared to the men's winner of the race with a time of 1 hour and 2 minutes. It required three battery changes and fell once, but was the only robot to finish within the 3 hour 10 minute time limit. The second and third places were taken by robotic participants from Beijing's Noetix Robotics.

Humanoid robots
Place	Robot Name	Team	Developer	Time	Category
1st	Tianggong Ultra		Beijing Humanoid Robot Innovation Center	2 hours 40 minutes	Remote-controlled
2nd	N2	Xiao Wantong Team	Noetix Robotics	3 hours and 37 minutes (exceeding the time limit)	Autonomous
3rd	N2	Whirlwind Kid Team	Noetix Robotics	(exceeding the time limit)	Remote-controlled

== 2026 ==
=== Rule changes ===
Following the experience of the first event, the rules were changed for the 2026 event. The main change was to encourage the robots to be autonomous rather than remote-controlled. If the robot was guided by human remote-control then its finishing time would be multiplied by 1.2.

Up to three battery changes were allowed for the robots. If the battery change was made on the course then there was no time penalty beyond the time required for the work. If the battery change was made off-course then there would be a time penalty. Robots could be replaced if they failed but there was a 15-minute time penalty for the first replacement and 20 minute penalty for the second.

The robots were arranged in a Z-shaped starting formation and released at 1-minute intervals to minimise the risk of collision or other interference. This separation was maintained through the race as robots were required to stay 5 metres apart.

=== 2026 results ===
In 2026, the race was held on 19 April over a course of 21.0975 kilometres from Tongming Lake Park to Nanhaizi Park in the Daxing district of southern Beijing. There were over 12,000 human runners and over 300 humanoid robots which ran on a parallel course for safety. The top three places were won by robots made by Honor, which also makes consumer electronic products such as smartphones.

The winner was a Lightning-model robot that finished in a time of 50:26 minutes, which is significantly faster than the human world record of 57:20 minutes which was set by Jacob Kiplimo at the Lisbon Half-Marathon in March. Another robot from Honor finished even quicker in 48:19 minutes but the event's handicapping rules penalised it for using human remote control rather than fully autonomous navigation like the winning robot, and so its time was increased by 20%. The second-place robot crashed into a barrier close to the finish and had to be helped up by humans to resume running.

2026 was the first time that robots surpassed humans in such a mass race and this impressed commentators and spectators as heralding the start of a new era in robot technology.

Autonomous Humanoid robots
Place	Robot Name	Team	Developer	Time	Category	Ref.
1st	Lightning	Qitian Dasheng Team	Honor	00:50:26	Autonomous	
2nd	Lightning	Leiting Shandian Team	Honor	00:50:56	Autonomous	
3rd	Lightning	Xinghuo Liaoyuan Team	Honor	00:53:01	Autonomous	

Remote-controlled Humanoid robots
Place	Robot Name	Team	Developer	Time	Category	Ref.
1st	Lightning	Jueying Chitu Team	Honor	00:48:19 (raw time before 20% handicap)	Remote-controlled	

Humans
Place	Sex	Name	Time	Ref.
1st	Men	Zhao Haijie	1 hour 7:47 minutes	
2nd	Men	Yan Ruiyang	1 hour 7:51 minutes	
3rd	Men	Chen Zhicheng	1 hour 9:46 minutes	
1st	Women	Wang Qiaoxia	1 hour 18:06 minutes	
2nd	Women	Yang Xiaoli	1 hour 20:14 minutes	
3rd	Women	Zhang Xiaomin	1 hour 22:01 minutes	

== See also ==
- World Humanoid Robot Games
- Robot competition
- Ultimate Robot Knock-out Legend
- Bio-inspired robotics
- Robotic prosthesis control
- Leg mechanism
