= Technoxian =

Robotics competition

World Robotics Championship Series
- Most recent season or competition: Rapid React
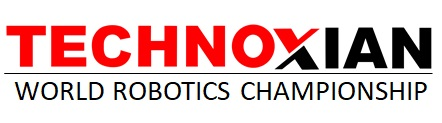
- Sport: Robotics-related games
- Founded: Rajkumar Sharma
- First season: 2014
- Motto: "Inspiring Innovation"
- No. of teams: 2248 (Yr2022)
- Countries: 15 Countries
- Venue: Indira Gandhi Arena
- Website: www.technoxian.com

The Technoxian, World Robotics Championship Series is a tournament where teams from all over the world comes to India to participate in various robotics challenges including Bots Combat, Robo Race, Robo Soccer, Maze Solver, Water Rocket, Drone Racing, RC Plane Racing and Innovation. 6th Edition of the championship held at Indira Gandhi Arena, India.

Each year between July and September, this international competition for youth organized at New Delhi, India. Youngsters aged between 8 and 20, form a club or they represent their school/college and apply for specific category of challenges. These clubs design and build their bots and then meet for national and international challenges to compete, showcase their talent, passion, team spirit, creative ideas. These clubs also get guidance and training throughout the year from the experts arranged by TechnoXian committee.

The Technoxian is also been supported by Ministry of Electronics and Information Technology, Government of India and AICRA, a non-profit organization working towards encouraging youth to learn new technologies and prepare for future roles.

== History ==
The first edition of Technoxian robotics tournament was played at IIT Gandhinagar in year 2014. Around 558 teams participated 4 categories of challenges from India, Bangladesh, Nepal and Sri Lanka. 2nd edition was held at IIT Delhi and 1202 teams participated in 8 categories of challenges from 7 countries in year 2015. 3rd edition held at Indira Gandhi Arena with 1900 teams in 9 categories and 12 countries team participated. 4th edition held at Thyagaraj Sports Complex with 1852 teams from 13 countries in year 2018. 5th edition organized again at Thyagaraj Sports Complex with 2952 teams from 18 countries in 9 categories. Due to COVID tournament postponed. 6th edition organized at Indira Gandhi Arena with 2248 teams from 15 countries in year 2022.

== Competition categories ==
Every year, the Technoxian governing committee decides the rules and norms for the challenges. There are nine categories of competition. These include:

- Bots Combat, Wireless bots (33 LBS, 66LBS and 133 LBS) fights on 40X40 feet metal floor arena and destroy the opponent.
- Robo Race, Manually controlled wireless bot to reach destination fastest while crossing all the hurdles.
- Robo Soccer a team of minimum 3 bots including defender and striker to score maximum goals.
- Robo Hockey, Robo Hockey is a coed (mixed) sport and teams must maintain a diverse and inclusivEe roster. Robo Hockey can be played by teams of equal size (3v3). Each team roster must be coed and may have a maximum of ten players. The 3 active players are referred to as "Operators", nonplaying members are "Crew".
- Maze Solver, Absolutely autonomous bots to be programed to clear maze and reach to destination earliest.
- Sumo Bots, The challenge objective is to force the opposing robot out of the arena by pushing or maneuvering them over the edge. Two bots compete in a head-to-head match following the basic system of traditional human sumo matches. Bots are allowed no weapons, and are not allowed to flip each other. The sole purpose is a pushing match between the two bots to force the other from the arena.
- Fastest Line Follower, An autonomous bot to follow black strip and reaching to destination fastest.
- RC Electric Car Racing, Experience the adrenaline-fueled excitement of RC Electric Car Racing Competition. Control your high-speed electric RC car through thrilling twists and turns on specialized tracks. Compete head-to-head with fellow enthusiasts, showcasing your skill and precision control. Join the action-packed races, where speed, strategy, and skill determine the ultimate champion.
- Water Rocket, Transparent rocket, containing water to be shot in air by creating air pressure. To win rocket should be in air for maximum time.
- FPV Drone Racing, Three stages of the competition where drone to take off and land, maneuvering, crossing hurdles and reaching to destination fastest.
- Drone Soccer, The drones, equipped with advanced sensors and algorithms, navigate the field, and attempt to score goals using their propellers. The objective of drone soccer is to score more goals than the opposing team within the allotted time limit.
- RC Plane Racing, An RC plane to be built with specific dimensions. Two stages of competition where plane has to show maneuvering and crossing hurdles.
- Drone Rescue Challenge, The challenge is to build a drone within the specified dimensions that are aerodynamically stable to achieve a successful flight. The competition has 4 rounds, in which the performance of the drone will be evaluated individually.
- Innovation, Technology based innovation projects to be showcased. It should be prototype and functioning with full capacity.

== Technoxian Clubs ==
Technoxian Clubs are to be formed by any education institutions including school, college, university, vocational institute or a group of youngsters who are interested in robotics and technologies. Each club should consist minimum 5 participants. Experts from all over contributes knowledge and skill to the members of official TX clubs. Participants also gets opportunity to exchange knowledge with other participants worldwide via TX club platform and gets support under Tech Startup Program.

== Technoxian Championship ==
In each category of competition, there is a winner, first runner up and two second runners up. All winning teams get a certificate from AICRA along with a cash award. USD 30,000 distributed during 6th edition of Technoxian. For the year 2023, US$50,000 has been allocated. Winning teams also gets listing as special clubs where they gets support in future skill development, interaction with senior scientists, exposure of industries. Apart from India, until now teams participated from Zimbabwe, Egypt, Italy, Bangladesh, Norway, Netherlands, Iran, Tanzania, Ethiopia, Sri Lanka, Malaysia, Kyrgyzstan, Kazakhstan, Nepal, UAE, Morocco, Germany, Nigeria, Turkey, Tunisia, Kenya.
