= Trinity Fire Fighting Robot Competition =

Trinity College (Connecticut) held an annual firefighting robot contest, which was contested by middle schools, high schools, and colleges from around the world. The competition is relevant for its antiquity, being established in 1994. It is one of the oldest in the world, ending in 2019. The competition was open to entrants of any ability, or experience from anywhere in the world.

The weekend competition also incorporated a “Robot Olympiad”, a timed test of questions about robot design, engineering, and programming.

In 2007 a new category was introduced, the baby-finding contest. Participants have to find both a flame and the simulated baby, extinguish the flame, and announce when it finds the latter in the expert division. In the concept division, simply finding the baby and notifying the people is sufficient.

For several years, the competition also included “Robowaiter”, a separate competition that had robots fetching and delivering food (dry cereal) on plastic plates, with various obstacles in the “house”.

Trinity engineering alumni also regularly brought various “challenge mazes” that added prizes for robots that could navigate other sizes and complexity of structures.
