= Ultimate Robot Knock-out Legend =

Chinese humanoid robot combat league

- Sport: Robot combat (humanoid robots)
- Founded: 9 February 2026; 7 months ago
- Owner: EngineAI
- CEO: Zhao Tongyang
- Headquarters: Shenzhen, Guangdong, China
- Website: en.engineai.com.cn/robot-fighting-competition.html

Ultimate Robot Knock-out Legend (URKL) is a Chinese humanoid robot combat league founded in 2026 by EngineAI. The world's first professional full-sized humanoid robot combat event, the inaugural event took place in Shenzhen, China on 16 July 2026 and saw over 200 global teams from 10 countries registering, with the top 32 teams proceeding to the main tournament after qualification rounds. The grand final is scheduled to be held in Dubai at around late December or early 2027. There is a total prize pool of 10 million yuan (approximately US$1.4 million), with the champion to receive a 10-kilogram pure gold championship belt.

== Competition format ==
The league uses standardized EngineAI T800 humanoid robots that are capable of a range of combat movements including uppercuts, spinning kicks, and the ability to get up quickly after falls. The winner is not determined simply by a knockout but rather through a broad evaluation that assesses the robots on a number of measures including their balance, power systems, motion control, decision-making, perception, and structural protection. As teams rely on identical base robots, successful performances are largely determined by software algorithms and strategic approaches.

According to the company's published rulebook on its official website, all teams were required to complete a "recovery test" during qualifiers. The test requires their robot to start from a fallen position, demonstrate "forced joint repositioning without human intervention", stand up and adopt the boxing stance. Fast recoveries within 3 second receive the highest scores while failure to recover within 20 seconds results in a score of zero. Additionally, competitors are prohibited from introducing any modifications that are deemed to be dangerous or malicious, and are required to submit their proposed algorithms for approval prior to a fight.

During the main competition, humanoid robots are required to perform all recoveries from a fallen position within 20 seconds without human intervention. For a strike to be valid, a robot must return to their upright fighting stance. However, if a robot falls after landing a strike on its opponent, the strike is marked as invalid. Robots are also evaluated on their smoothness, stability, rhythm, and postural aesthetics.

== Robot platform ==
The EngineAI T800 humanoid robot is issued to every participating team for use in the competition. The league uses a hybrid control system. Unlike a purely teleoperated system in which the operator directly controls individual movements, UKRL robots handles more of its own low-level physical decision-making required to execute the operator's commands, resulting in more dynamically responsive and rapid movements during combat. The robot receives high‑level intent commands from a human operator using a hand-held remote, which include "positioning on the mat, when to advance [and] when to trigger specific combat moves", while its onboard systems handle aspects of physical execution, including balance, stabilization, and motion control. According to RoboSports Global, this enables the robots to execute aerial rotation kicks and sidekick combinations faster than what a fully human-piloted robot can achieve through purely VR or joystick controls.

The robot is equipped with 360° LiDAR system that enables it to assess opponents and its surroundings in milliseconds, while also allowing it to navigate around and accurately avoid obstacles. Its onboard AI can calculate micro-adjustments needed for walking, throwing strikes, and shifting its weight. It can perform a variety of combat movements that includes recovering from falls, spinning kicks, uppercuts and leg sweeps, as well as performing gestures like taunting opponents and victory dances.

It is 173 cm (68 in) tall and has a peak joint torque of 450 Nm. According to strategic analysis publication Tecrow, this exceeds the 200 to 250 Nm of peak knee-joint torque generated by a highly conditioned human male athlete during a maximum-effort kick.

Specification	Value
Height	1.73 m (5 ft 8 in)
Weight	75 kg (165 lb)
Maximum joint torque	Up to 450 N⋅m (knee joints)
Maximum speed	Approximately 3 m/s (6.7 mph)
Battery runtime	Approximately 4–5 hours per charge; hot-swappable battery system
Perception systems	360° LiDAR, stereo vision, and omnidirectional radar
Computing	Intel computing modules and NVIDIA AGX Orin-class AI computing options
Connectivity	Wi-Fi, Bluetooth, USB, and LAN
Chassis	Aviation-grade aluminium alloy body
Cooling system	Active cooling integrated in leg joints to endure high-intensity operation
Joints	29 high-torque joints configured for human-like motion

== Inaugural season ==
The opening event of URKL was co-organized by EngineAI and Quanmingxing Robotics and held on 16 July 2026 at the Shenzhen Nanshan Cultural and Sports Center in Shenzhen, China. The tournament's first rounds are scheduled to take place for July-August, followed by later rounds in September-October, with the grand final scheduled for Dubai in late December 2026 or January 2027. The prize money pool is approximately $1.4 million, with the winning team to receive a ten kilogram pure gold championship belt.

Reportedly, 200 teams from 10 countries registered with the top 32 making it past the online qualifiers and proceeding to the physical deployment cut. Some of the qualifying teams had included Stanford University, Tsinghua University, and Zhejiang University. Each team reaching the physical deployment stage is issued an EngineAI T800 humanoid robot that is capable of 450 Nm of peak torque. Since all robots are essentially identical in hardware, the contest is largely a battle in software.

=== Opening Rounds ===
On 16 July 2026, the league's first matches were held in Shenzen. Donnie Yen was reported to be a special guest during opening night. Media outlets reported on a viral highlight in a match between two robots, White Eagle and Matador. In the final round, White Eagle landed a high tornado kick against Matador's head, causing it to become detached from the robot's body. Despite having its head hanging from its torso, Matador continued fighting and finished the match without shutting down. Organizers praised Matador's ability to continue fighting, stating it had demonstrated designed redundancy and structural durability. Matador secured victory by narrowly winning three of the five scored rounds against White Eagle.

=== Shanghai ===
On 19 September, Shanghai was the first stop of the UKRL national tour and hosted a series of combat matches at the Baoshan Gymnasium basketball hall. Matches uses a five-round scoring system with each match timed to run for 5 minutes. According to The New York Post, the robots autonomously navigated the competition area, perceived their opponent's postures and responded to their movements in real time.

== See also ==
- Mixed martial arts
- Android (robot)
- Beijing E-Town Half-Marathon
- Real Steel
- World Humanoid Robot Games
