= RoboGames =

Annual robot contest in San Mateo, California

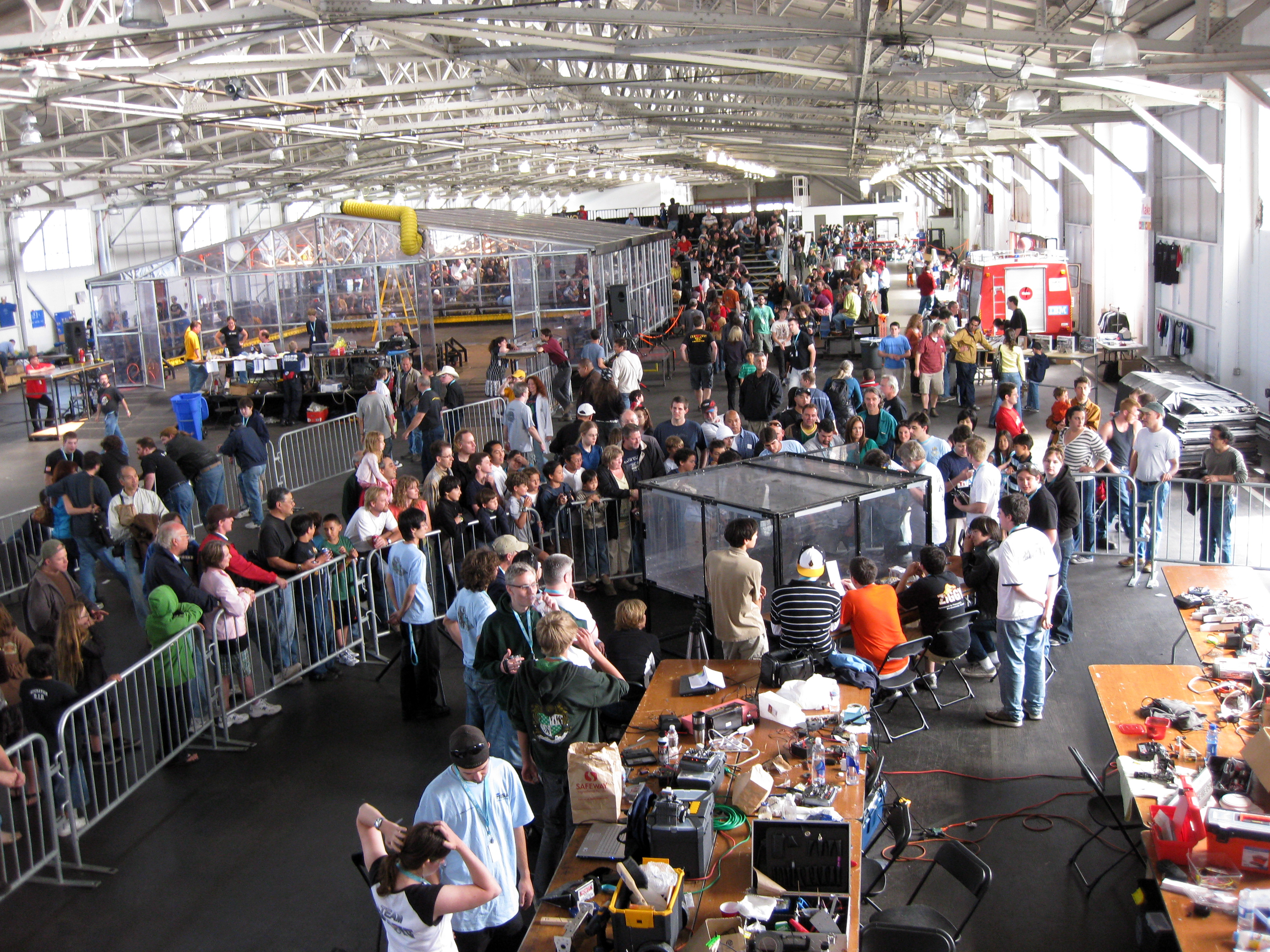
RoboGames 2008 (The large structure in the upper left is the combat robot arena.)

RoboGames (previously ROBOlympics) is an international competition where robot builders test their creations against each other in organized events. The last RoboGames was held on April 18-21, 2024 in San Jose, California, having been on hiatus since the previous event in April 2018.

Competitions typically involve entrants representing a large selection of countries, who compete in over fifty categories, such as autonomously navigating robots in RoboMagellan, combat robots, stair-climbing, weight-lifting, soccer bots, sumo bots, and kung-fu. About two thirds of the robot events are autonomous, while the remaining third are remotely operated (RCVs). Despite this, a large plurality of entrants in RoboGames remain in the remotely operated events, specifically combat robotics.

According to the Guinness Book of World Records, the 2005 RoboGames held the record for the world's largest robot competition until being surpassed by VEX Worlds in 2016. RoboGames was selected by Wired for their list of "The Best Ten North American Geek Fests".

== Media coverage ==
In May/June 2011, Science Channel broadcast selected heavyweight combat division matches from RoboGames in a one-hour special titled Killer Robots: RoboGames 2011. The program was hosted by Grant Imahara. RoboGames built a framework for collaboration between builders and engineers from all over the world.

== Uncertain future ==
RoboGames returned in April 2023 following a five-year hiatus that began after the 2018 event. The 16th annual competition was subsequently held on April 18–21, 2024, in San Jose, California at the San Jose Convention Center. Teams from around the world participated, including the Hong Kong University of Science and Technology, which reported winning fifteen medals across multiple categories. Community reports and independent coverage noted significant safety issues during the 2024 event, including arena breaches and battery fires that resulted in heavy smoke and at least minor injuries, prompting criticism of venue safety standards. As of 2025, no official announcement of a subsequent RoboGames has been made, and the future of the competition remains unclear.

== Events ==
RoboGames events are divided into ten general categories:

- Humanoids, for human-like robots
- Sumo, where the robots push their opponents
- Combat, where the object is to destroy one's opponent's robot
- Junior League, a category for under-18s
- Autonomous Autos, a navigation category
- BEAM, a racing competition
- Art Bots, for aesthetically pleasing robots
- Robot Soccer, a soccer competition
- Autonomous Humanoid Challenges
- Open, a miscellaneous category
