= List of sports television series =

This is a list of sports television series. This list is compiled of sports television shows from different countries around the world.

== # ==
- 1st and 10
- 1st & Ten (HBO, 1984–1991)
- 2 Minute Drill (ESPN, 2000–2001)
- 24/7 (HBO, 2007–present)
- 30 for 30

== A ==
- Adventures Abroad
- AFL 360 (Fox Sports (Australia) from 2010 to 2011, and Fox Footy from 2012–present)
- Against the Head (RTÉ Two, 2003–present)
- The American Athlete
- American Sports Cavalcade (TNN, 1983–1995)
- American Sports Story
- Arliss (HBO, 1996–2002)
- Around the Horn (ESPN, 2002–present)
- Athlete 360
- Australia's Greatest Athlete (Aired on Nine Network in 2009, then on Seven Network from 2010 to 2011)
- The Average Guys TV Show

== B ==
- Back in the Game
- The Back Page (Fox Sports (Australia), 1997–present)
- The Bad News Bears
- Bad Sport
- Ball Boys (ABC, 2012)
- Ball Four
- Ballers
- Baseball Tonight (ESPN, 1990–present)
- Baseball's Golden Age
- Battle of the Gridiron Stars
- Bay City Blues
- The Best and Worst of Tred Barta (NBCSN, 2004–present)
- The Best Damn Sports Show Period (Fox Sports Net, 2001–2009)
- The Big Fight Live (ITV, 1984–1995, 2005–2010, 2015-present)
- The Blitz
- Blue Mountain State
- Boots N' All (Sky Sports)
- Bound for Glory
- Bowhunter TV
- Boxing After Dark (HBO, 1996–present)
- Break Point
- The Bronx is Burning (ESPN, 2007)

== C ==
- CBS Sports Spectacular (1960–present)
- Celebrity Boxing (FOX, 2002)
- CFL on CBC (CBC Television, 1952–2007)
- CFL on CTV (CTV, 1962–1986)
- Championship Goals (ITV, 2004–2009)
- Championship Week
- Cheap Seats (ESPN Classic, 2004–2006)
- Classic Now (ESPN Classic, 2005–2006)
- Clipped (miniseries)
- Clubhouse
- Coach (ABC, 1989–1997)
- Cold Pizza (ESPN2, 2003–2007)
- College Basketball on CBS (CBS, 1981–present)
- College Football Live
- College GameDay (basketball) (ESPN, 2005–present)
- College GameDay (football) (ESPN, 1987–present)
- College Scoreboard
- The Contender
- Costas Now (HBO, 2005–2009)
- Cricket on Five (Channel 5, 2006–present)

== D ==
- The Daily Habit
- Dallas Cowboys Cheerleaders: Making the Team (CMT, 2006–present)
- Dangerous Game
- Destination Tennis

== E ==
- E:60 (ESPN2, 2007–present)
- Eastbound & Down (HBO, 2009–2010, 2012–2013)
- Eircom League Weekly (TV3, 2002–2007)
- ESPN Classic Remembers
- ESPN College Football Saturday Primetime
- ESPN College Football Thursday Primetime
- ESPN Full Circle
- ESPN National Hockey Night (ESPN, 1992–2004)
- ESPN Sunday Night Football (ESPN, 1987–2006)
- ESPN2 College Football Friday Primetime
- ESPN2 College Football Saturday Primetime
- ESPN2 Garage
- ESPNews Gametime
- ESPNU Coaches Spotlight
- ESPNU College Basketball
- ESPNU College Football
- ESPNU Inside the Polls
- ESPNU Recruiting Insider
- Estadio Uno (Televisión Nacional Uruguay, 1970–2017)
- Extreme Dodgeball (Game Show Network, 2004–2005)

== F ==
- Fanarchy
- The Fantasy Show
- Fight Girls (Oxygen Network)
- Final Score (BBC, 1958–present)
- Final Score (Fox Sports Net, 2006–2011)
- First Take (ESPN2, 2007–present)
- Football League Extra (ITV, 1994–2004)
- The Football League Show (BBC One, 2009–present)
- A Football Life (NFL Network, 2011–present)
- Football Night in America (NBC, 2006–present)
- Footballers' Wives (ITV, 2002–2006)
- The Footy Show (Nine Network, 1994–present)
- Fore Inventors Only (Golf Channel)
- Formula 1: Drive to Survive
- Fox Football Fone-in (Fox Soccer Channel, 2007–2010)
- Fox NFL Kickoff
- Fox NFL Sunday (FOX, 1994–present)
- Fox Sports Live (Fox Sports 1, 2013–2017)
- Friday Night Fights (ESPN2, 1998–2015)
- Friday Night Lights (NBC & 101 Network, 2006–2011)
- The Full Motty
- Full Swing

== G ==
- The Game
- Game of Arms
- Games People Play
- Garbage Time with Katie Nolan (Fox Sports 1, 2015–2017)
- The George Michael Sports Machine (Syndication, 1984–2007)
- Gillette Cavalcade of Sports (NBC, 1946–1960)
- Goals on Sunday (Sky Sports)
- Golf at Altitude (Altitude Sports and Entertainment, 2005–present)
- Grand Prix (BBC2, 1978–1996)
- Greatest Sports Legends

== H ==
- H2 (1995–1996)
- H2: Kimi to Ita Hibi (2005)
- Hank Parker's Outdoor Magazine (Syndication, 1985–present)
- Hard Knocks (HBO: First from 2001 to 2002, and again from 2007–present)
- Hardball
- Hardwood Classics (NBA TV, 1999–present)
- Harlem Globetrotters
- HBO World Championship Boxing (HBO, 1973–present)
- The Herd with Colin Cowherd (ESPNU, 2008-2011 & 2012–2015, ESPNews, 2011–2012, Fox Sports 1, 2015-present)
- Highly Questionable (ESPN2, 2011–present)
- His & Hers (ESPN2, 2011–2017)
- Hockey Central (Sportsnet)
- Hockey Night in Canada (CBC Television, 1952–2014)
- Hockey Night Live!
- Homecoming with Rick Reilly
- The Hoop Life
- The Hot List (ESPNEWS, 2004–2009)
- Howie Meeker's Hockey School (CBC, 1973–1977)
- Hunter's Handbook TV
- Hunting 201

== I ==
- I, Max (Fox Sports Net, 2004–2005)
- Inside Sport (BBC One, 2007–present)
- Inside the NBA (TNT, 1988–present)
- Inside the NFL (HBO from 1977 to 2008, Showtime from 2008–present, & NFL Network from 2014–present)

== J ==
- The Jim Coleman Show (CBC Television, 1959–1960)
- Jim Rome is Burning (ESPN, 2003–2011, ESPN2, 2011–2012)
- The Jump (Channel 4, 2014–present)

== K ==
- Keijo!!!!!!!! (Tokyo MX, AT-X, BS11, 2016)
- Kick Start (BBC One, 1979–1988)
- Knight School (ESPN, 2006)
- Know Your Sport (RTÉ, 1987–1998)

== L ==
- Last Chance U
- The Last Leg (Channel 4, 2012–present)
- A League of Their Own (CBS, 1993)
- A League of Their Own (game show) (Sky 1, 2010–present)
- The League (FX from 2009 to 2012, and FXX from 2013–present)
- The Life (ESPN)
- Lights Out

== M ==
- Major League Baseball on ABC (ABC: First run: 1953–1965. Second run: 1976–1989. Third run: 1994–1995)
- Major League Baseball on CBS (CBS: First run: 1955–1965. Second run: 1990–1993)
- Major League Baseball on Fox (FOX, 1996–present)
- Major League Baseball on NBC (NBC: First run: 1947–1989. Second run: 1994–2000)
- Major League Baseball on TBS (TBS, 2007–present)
- Major League Baseball on TSN (TSN, 1984–present)
- Match of the Day (BBC Two from 1964 to 1965, BBC One from 1965–present)
- Match of the Day (U.S. TV series) (NBCSN, 2013–present)
- Mike & Mike
- Missing Link
- MLB Tonight (MLB Network, 2009–present)
- MLB Whiparound (Fox Sports 1, 2014–present)
- Monday Night Football (Aired on ABC from 1970 to 2005, and then on ESPN from 2006–present)
- Monday Night Soccer (RTÉ Two, 2008–2013)
- MTV Rock N' Jock
- My Boys (TBS, 2006–2010)
- MVP (2008)

== N ==
- NASCAR Countdown
- NASCAR: Full Speed
- NASCAR Now (ESPN2, 2007–2014)
- NASCAR on Fox (FOX, 2001–present)
- NASCAR on TBS (TBS, 1983–2000)
- NASCAR Outdoors
- NASCAR RaceDay (Fox Sports 1, 2013–present)
- NASCAR Race Hub (Fox Sports 1, 2013–present)
- NASCAR Victory Lane (Fox Sports 1, 2013–present)
- National Sports Report (Fox Sports Net, 1996–2002)
- NBA Access with Ahmad Rashad
- NBA Coast to Coast
- NBA Fastbreak
- NBA Inside Stuff (NBC, 1990–2002. ABC, 2002–2005. NBA TV, 2013-present)
- NBA on ABC (ABC: First run: 1965–1973. Second run: 2002-present)
- NBA on CBS (CBS, 1973–1990)
- NBA on ESPN (ESPN: First run: 1982–1984. Second run: 2002-present)
- NBA on NBC (NBC: First run: 1954–1962. Second run: 1990–2002. Third run: 2025-present)
- NBA on TBS (TBS, 1984–2002)
- NBA on TNT (TNT, 1988–2025)
- NBA Shootaround (ESPN, 2002–present)
- NBC Sunday Night Football (NBC, 2006–present)
- NFL AM
- NFL Insiders
- NFL Live (First on ESPN2 from 1998 to 2002, and then on ESPN from 2002–present)
- NFL on CBS (CBS: First run: 1956–1994. Second run: 1998-present)
- NFL on FOX (FOX, 1994–present)
- NFL on NBC (NBC: First run: 1939–1998. Later returned in 2006 with NBC Sunday Night Football)
- The NFL Today (CBS: First run: 1975–1994. Second run: 1998-present)
- NFL Top 10 (NFL Network, 2007–present)
- NFL Top 100 (NFL Network, 2011–present)
- NFL Total Access (NFL Network, 2003–present)
- NHL 2Night (ESPN2, 1995–2004)
- NHL on ABC (ABC: First from 1993 to 1994, and then from 2000 to 2004)
- NHL on CTV
- NHL on Fox (FOX, 1995–1999)
- NHL on NBC (NBC, 2006–2021)
- NHL on RKO General
- NHL on Sportsnet
- NHL on Versus (Versus, 2005–2011)
- NHL Tonight

== O ==
- Off the Record with Michael Landsberg (TSN, 1997–present)
- The Official BCS Ratings Show
- Oil Change (TSN from 2010 to 2011, and Sportsnet from 2011 to 2014)
- Olbermann (ESPN2, 2013–present)
- Olympic Treasures
- On the Ball (ITV: First run: 1965–1985. Second run: 1998–2004)
- On the Bench
- On the Couch (Fox Footy Channel from 2002 to 2006, Fox Sports (Australia) from 2007 to 2011, and Fox Footy from 2012–present)
- On the Record with Bob Costas (HBO, 2001–2004)
- Outside the Lines (ESPN, 1990–present)

== P ==
- Pardon the Interruption (ESPN, 2001–present)
- PGA Tour on USA
- Phenom
- Pinks
- Pitch (FOX, 2016)
- Playmakers (ESPN, 2003)
- The Premiership (ITV Sport, 2001–2004)
- Prime Time Sports (A sports radio show that has been simulcast on Rogers Sportsnet from 2004–present)
- Pro Football Now
- Pros vs. Joes (Spike, 2006–2010)
- Put Up Your Dukes
- Power Rangers Turbo (1997)
- Power Play (1998-2000)

== Q ==
- Quarterback (TV series)
- A Question of Sport (BBC One, 1968–present)

== R ==
- Race for the Pennant
- Radical Outdoor Challenge
- Real Sports with Bryant Gumbel (HBO, 1995–present)
- Receiver (Netflix)
- República Deportiva (Univision, 1999–present)
- Rivals: Sport vs. Sport (Foxtel, Kayo Sports, 2026)
- Rory and Paddy's Great British Adventure (Five, 2008 & 2010)
- Running Point

== S ==
- Saint and Greavsie (ITV, 1985–1992)
- Saturday Night at the Garden (DuMont, 1950–1951)
- Saturday Night Footy (Network Ten, 2002–2011, One, 2009–2011, Seven Network, 2012-present & 7mate, 2012–present)
- Scotsport (STV, 1957–2008)
- Season of Champions on TSN (TSN)
- SEC Nation
- SEC Network Football
- Shaqtin' a Fool
- ShoBox: The New Generation (Showtime, 2001–present)
- The Show to Be Named Later...
- Showtime Championship Boxing (Showtime, 1986–present)
- Skip and Shannon: Undisputed (Fox Sports 1, 2016–present)
- Soccer Academy
- Soccer Central (Sportsnet, 2012–present)
- Soccer Night (ITV, 1990s-2008)
- Soccer Republic (RTÉ Two, 2014–present)
- Speak for Yourself with Cowherd & Whitlock (Fox Sports 1, 2016–present)
- Sport Nation (BBC Two Scotland, 2009–present)
- Sport Science
- Sports Cartoons
- Sports Challenge (Syndication, 1971–1979)
- Sports Geniuses (Fox Sports Net, 2000)
- Sports Night (ABC, 1998–2000)
- Sports on Tap
- Sports Page (1977-2005)
- The Sports Reporters (ESPN, 1988–present)
- Sports Soup
- Sports Stars of Tomorrow (Syndication, 2005–present)
- Sports Tonight (CNN from 1980 to 2001, and CNN/SI from 1996 to 2002)
- SportsCenter (ESPN, 1979–present)
- SportsCentre (TSN, 1984–present)
- SportsCentury (ESPN, 1999–2007)
- SportsDesk (NESN, 1991–2010)
- SportsNation (ESPN2, 2009–present)
- Sportsworld (Seven Network, 1990–2006)
- Sportsworld (U.S. TV series) (NBC, 1978–1992)
- The Sportswriters on TV (1985-2000)
- The Standard Snowboard Show
- Starting 5
- Stump the Schwab (ESPN2 from 2004 to 2005, and ESPN Classic in 2006)
- Summer House
- SummerBall
- Sunday NFL Countdown (ESPN, 1985–present)
- Sunday Night Baseball (ESPN, 1990–present)
- Super Bikes!
- Survivor's Remorse

== T ==
- Talk2 (ESPN2, 1993–1998)
- That Was The Team That Was (BBC One Scotland, 2006–2007)
- That's Hockey (TSN, 1995–present)
- They Think It's All Over (BBC One, 1995–2006)
- This Week in Baseball (First-run syndication, 1977–1998, FOX, 2000–2011)
- Thrillbillies (Fuel TV, 2009–present)
- Thursday Night Baseball (MLB Network, 2009–present)
- Thursday Night Football
- The Tim McCarver Show (Syndication, 2000–present)
- The Top 5 Reasons You Can't Blame... (ESPN2 & ESPN Classic, 2005–2007)
- Track & Field Weekly (Olympic Channel, 2018–present)
- TSN Hockey (TSN: First from 1987 to 1998, and again from 2002 to 2014)

== U ==
- UFC Primetime (Spike TV, 2009–2011, FX, 2012-present)
- UFC Tonight (Fox Sports 1, 2013–present)
- UFC Ultimate Insider (Fuel TV, 2012–present)
- Under the Moon (Channel 4, 1996–1998)
- Unique Whips (Speed Channel, 2005–2008)
- Unscripted with Chris Connelly (ESPN, 2001–2002)
- Untold: The Greatest Sports Stories Never Told (Spike TV, 2004–2005)
- Up Close (First on USA in 1981, and later on ESPN from 1982 to 2001)
- USA Tuesday Night Fights (USA, 1982–1998)
- USL Breakaways

== V ==
- Vintage NBA (ESPN Classic, 1999–2003)

== W ==
- The Way It Was (PBS, 1974–1978)
- Wayne Rooney's Street Striker (Sky1, 2008–2010)
- WCW Monday Nitro (TNT, 1995–2001)
- WCW Thunder (TBS, 1998–2001)
- Welcome to Wrexham
- Western Extreme
- Whacked Out Sports
- The White Shadow (CBS, 1978–1981)
- Who's No. 1? (ESPN, 2004)
- A Whole New Ballgame
- Wide World of Sports (Australian TV series) (Nine Network: First from 1981 to 1999, then again from 2008–present)
- Wide World of Sports (U.S. TV series) (ABC, 1961–1998)
- Wild World of Spike (Spike, 2007)
- Wimp 2 Warrior
- Winning Time: The Rise of the Lakers Dynasty
- World of Sport (ITV, 1965–1985)
- WWE Free for All
- WWE Raw (USA from 1993 to 2000, Spike TV from 2000 to 2005, then again on USA from 2005–present)
- WWE Smackdown

== X ==
- Xcorps Action Sport TV

== Y ==
- Yuri on Ice (2016)
