= List of programs broadcast by Bravo (Canadian TV channel) =

This is a list of past and present programs broadcast by the Canadian television channel Bravo and its former incarnations Outdoor Life Network and OLN.

== Current programming (as Bravo) ==
=== A-E ===
- Below Deck
- Below Deck Sailing Yacht
- Below Deck Mediterranean

=== I-T ===
- Impractical Jokers
- So You Think You Can Dance Canada
- Summer House
- Southern Charm
- The Real Housewives of Beverly Hills
- The Real Housewives of New York City
- The Real Housewives of Orange County
- The Real Housewives of Salt Lake City
- Top Chef

=== U-Z ===
- Vanderpump Rules

== As Outdoor Life Network/OLN ==
=== A-E ===
- Bob's Burgers
- Dirt Trax Television

=== F-J ===
- Fail Army
- Family Guy
- Fish TV

=== P-T ===
- The Simpsons
- Storage Wars
- Storage Wars Canada

== Earlier programming ==
=== # ===
- 2000 European Football Championships
- 2010 Winter Olympics

=== A-E ===
- Angry Planet
- Angler and Hunter Television
- The Beat
- The Best and Worst of Tred Barta
- Beyond Borders
- Beyond Survival
- Buck Commander
- Campus PD
- Canada in the Rough
- The Canadian Tradition
- Close Up Kings
- Conspiracy Theory with Jesse Ventura
- Courage in Red
- Crash Addicts
- Creepy Canada
- Dangerous Game
- Deals from the Darkside
- Descending
- Departures
- Destination Truth
- Dog The Bounty Hunter
- Duck Commander
- Duck Dynasty
- Dudesons
- Dussault Inc.
- Dynamo: Magician Impossible
- Ed's Up

=== F-J ===
- Forbidden
- Get Stuffed
- Ghost Hunters
- The Happenings
- Haunted Collector
- Half Mile Of Hell
- Hillbilly Preppers: Atlanta
- I Shouldn't Be Alive
- Illusions of Grandeur

=== K-O ===
- Kentucky Bidders
- Killing Bigfoot
- The Liquidator
- The Liquidator: On the Go
- Man v. Food
- Mantracker
- Meat Eater
- Minute to Win It
- Monsterquest
- NASCAR Outdoors
- ODYSSEY: Driving Around the World
- Operation Repo
- The Outhouse

=== P-T ===
- Pilot Guides
- Polar Bear Town
- The Project - Guatemala
- Python Hunters
- RCTV
- Red Bull: Air Race
- Red Bull: Cliff Diving
- Red Bull: Crashed Ice
- Red Bull: Signature Series
- Red Bull: X-Fighters
- The Rig
- Saw Dogs
- Snowmobiler TV
- SnowTrax Television
- Road Hockey Rumble
- Spruce Meadows
- Storage Hunters
- Storage Wars: New York
- Storage Wars: Texas
- Survivorman
- Tour de France
- Tow Biz
- Treks in a Wild World

=== U-Z ===
- UFO Hunters
- Which Way To...
- Wild Things with Dominic Monaghan
- Word Travels
- You Can't Lick Your Elbow

== See also ==
- OLN
- NBC Sports Network
