= Dangerous Game =

Dangerous Game(s) or The Dangerous Game(s) may refer to:

== Film ==
- The Dangerous Game (1933 film), a Swedish film
- Dangerous Game (1937 film), a German comedy film
- The Dangerous Game (1942 film), a Norwegian comedy film
- Dangerous Games (1958 film), a French film
- Dangerous Games (film), a 1974 Estonian film directed by Veljo Käsper
- Dangerous Game (1987 film), an Australian film directed by Stephen Hopkins
- Dangerous Game (1993 film), an American film directed by Abel Ferrara
- Dangerous Game (2017 film), a British action film
- Dangerous Games: Roblox and the Metaverse Exposed, a 2025 Canadian documentary film directed by Ann Shin

== Literature ==
- The Dangerous Games, a 2002 novel by Jude Watson in the Star Wars Jedi Quest book series
- Dangerous Games (anthology), a 2007 science fiction anthology edited by Jack Dann and Gardner Dozois
- Dangerous Games (Nancy Drew/Hardy Boys), a 1991 Hardy Boys and Nancy Drew Supermystery novel
- Dangerous Games (Steel novel), a 2017 novel by Danielle Steel
- Dangerous Games, a 1996 novel by Clayton Emery

== Music ==
- Dangerous Games (album), 1986 album by American heavy metal band Alcatrazz
- "Dangerous Game" (Network 3 song), 1981 single by British Christian trio Network 3
- "Dangerous Game", 3 Doors Down song from the album Away from the Sun
- "Dangerous Game", Kylie Minogue song from the album Kylie Minogue
- Dangerous Game (album), 2007 album by Mary Weiss

== Other ==
- Dangerous Game (TV series), American hunting show debuted in 1994
- Dangerous Games (TV series), American-Armenian drama
- Big five game, referred to as Dangerous Game by hunters

== See also ==
- A Dangerous Game (disambiguation)
- The Most Dangerous Game (disambiguation)
