= The Most Dangerous Game (disambiguation) =

"The Most Dangerous Game" is a 1924 short story by Richard Connell.

The Most Dangerous Game or variants may also refer to:

- The Most Dangerous Game (1932 film), a Pre-Code film adaptation of the short story
- The Most Dangerous Game (2022 film), a remake of the 1932 film
- The Most Dangerous Game (novel), a 1964 novel by Gavin Lyall
- Most Dangerous Game, a 2020 streaming action series adaptation of the short story
- "The Most Dangerous Game" (Beavis and Butt-Head), a 2022 television episode
- The Most Dangerous Games, a 2026 novel by James Patterson and MrBeast

== See also ==
- A Dangerous Game (disambiguation)
- Dangerous Game (disambiguation)
- Most dangerous sports, sport activities perceived as involving a high degree of risk
