= Sklar Brothers =

American actors

Randy and Jason Sklar
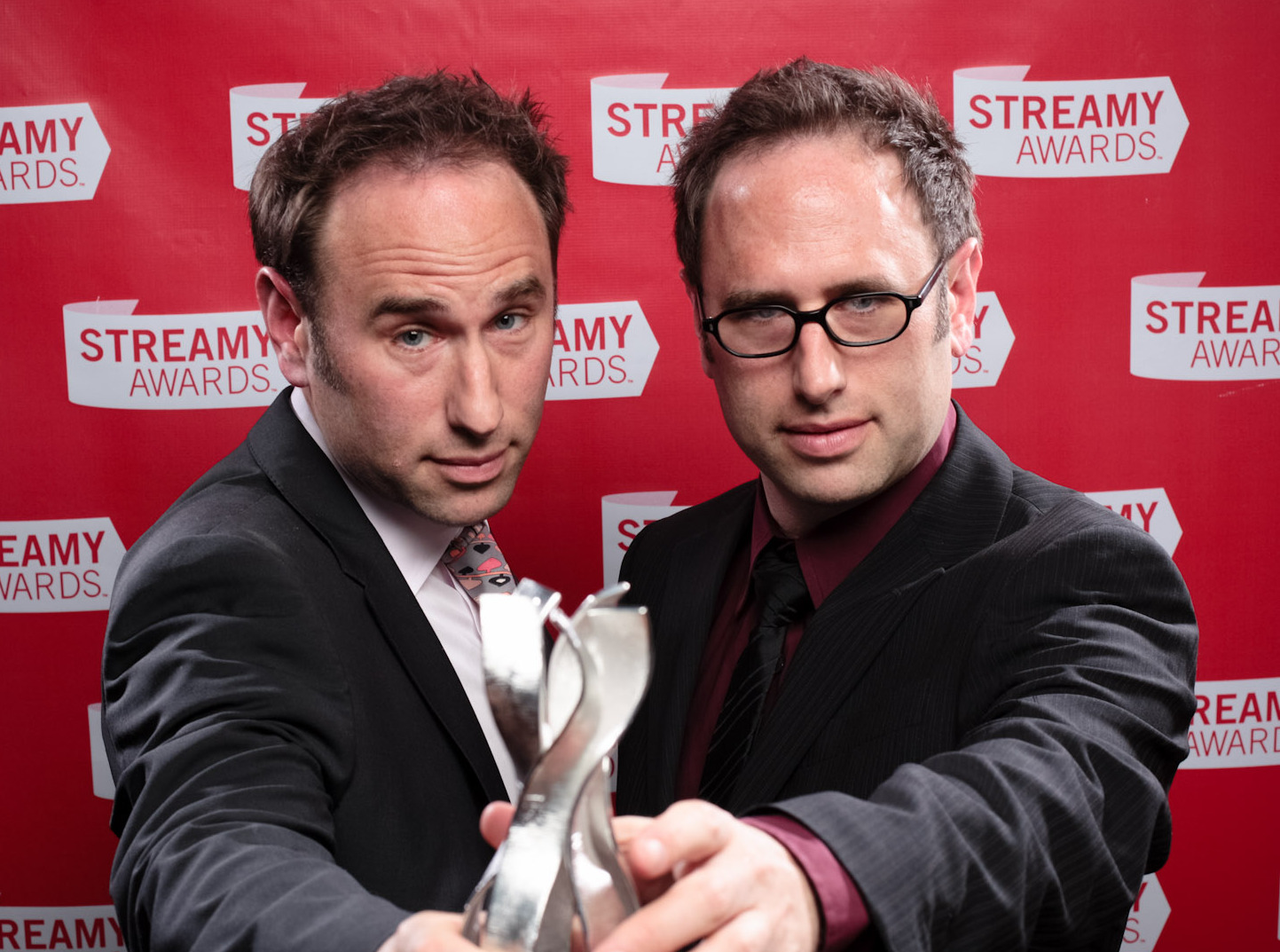
- Randy (left) and Jason Sklar at the Streamy Awards 2010
- Born: January 12, 1972 (age 54); St. Louis, Missouri, U.S.
- Other name: Sklar Brothers
- Education: University of Michigan
- Occupations: Actors, comedians
- Notable work: The Oblongs, Apt 2F, Cheap Seats, Back on Topps, Held Up, Sklarbro Country, Sklarbro County (midweek podcast of Sklarbro Country), Mighty Med, You're Doing It Wrong, Finding the Funny
- Spouse(s): Amy Sklar (Randy); Jessica Zucker (Jason)
- Children: 2 each
- Awards: Streamy Awards
- Website: Official website

Farrell Randal "Randy" Sklar and Jason Nathan Sklar (born January 12, 1972), professionally known as the Sklar Brothers, are American identical twin brother comedians and actors best known for hosting the show Cheap Seats, which aired for four seasons on ESPN Classic.

== Life and career ==
Randy and Jason grew up in suburban St. Louis in a Jewish family. They went to the University of Michigan, where they joined the Alpha Epsilon Pi fraternity. While enrolled, they decided to pursue a career in comedy.

In 1994, they moved to New York where they developed their comedy style at stand-up comedy clubs. In 1997, Jason and Randy starred in and wrote for MTV's sitcom/sketch/standup program Apt 2F. It was their first television work. The show lasted one season.

The Sklar brothers have also appeared in television shows such as CSI, Comedy Bang! Bang!, Mighty Med, Childrens Hospital, Law & Order, Becker, Providence, The Oblongs (as conjoined twin brothers Biff and Chip Oblong), Entourage, Grey's Anatomy (as conjoined twin brothers Peter and Jake Weitzman), Curb Your Enthusiasm (Jason only), and It's Always Sunny in Philadelphia (as dance marathon DJs on the episode "The Gang Dances Their Asses Off"). They appeared in two episodes of season 3 of Better Call Saul as the owners of a music shop called ABQ In Tune. The Sklars have appeared in the films My Baby's Daddy, Bubble Boy, Wild Hogs, and The Comebacks.

The brothers were pit reporters on Comedy Central's Battlebots. Randy appeared on an episode of Take Home Chef, where his wife and chef Curtis Stone surprised him with a gourmet dinner of Beef Wellington. They have appeared numerous times on Chelsea Lately. They have appeared on Comedy Central's @midnight. They produced and starred in a special that ran on ESPN2 called Utilityman: The Quest for Cooperstown, a lighthearted yet somewhat serious attempt to get seminal utility baseball player for the St. Louis Cardinals in the 1980s José Oquendo into the Baseball Hall of Fame in Cooperstown. Randy has appeared numerous times on the Forum on Jim Rome is Burning on ESPN and Rome on CBS Sports. They appear monthly on Rome on Showtime in a segment called "Sklarred for Life".

They appeared in the 2008 Microsoft film VoIP As You Are: The Legend of Dan Wilson.

They regularly fill in as guest hosts for Jim Rome on his National and North American syndicated radio show formerly on Premiere Radio, currently on CBS Radio.

They participated regularly on NPR's southern California affiliate KPCC's The Madeleine Brand Show as sports correspondents.

They produced two sports pilots called Sklar Talk for NPR's KPCC that both aired in 2011.

The Sklars are also frequent guests on the podcasts Never Not Funny and World Football Daily. They have also appeared on The Adam Carolla Show, AST Radio, Jordan, Jesse GO! and Battleship Pretension, WTF with Marc Maron, You Made It Weird, and Professor Blastoff.

They were featured in the Troma production Citizen Toxie: The Toxic Avenger IV as Jason Gonzalez and Randy Diaz, a pair of Tromaville news anchormen.

Randy and Jason are featured in an ad campaign by running shoe and apparel company Brooks.

In August 2010, they made a cameo appearance in the web comedy The Legend of Neil in season 3 episode 3, depicting two football-loving "Armos" statues.

In 2012, the twins began to appear in what would become a series of commercials for Time Warner Cable.

In February 2014, the brothers recorded their first one-hour stand-up special at the Majestic Theater in Madison, Wisconsin. The special then premiered on Netflix on April 25, 2014 and the CD/DVD dropped on iTunes on April 29, 2014. The brothers uniquely framed their special as if it were an NFL playoff game with Rich Eisen leading a roundtable discussion of the brothers' comedy on an NFL Network set, along with future Hall of Fame defensive lineman Dwight Freeney, NY Giants defensive back Terrell Thomas, and actor and former Georgia Bulldog football player Omar Dorsey. In addition, the ubiquitous sideline reporter Bonnie Bernstein makes a cameo, interviewing the brothers pre- and post-show. The stand up special features a pre-game breakdown by this crew, a halftime report, and a post game wrap up. The stand up special titled What Are We Talking About was available on Netflix instant streaming for three years after the April 25, 2014 premiere.

Randy Sklar is married to Amy Sklar, an interior designer who was featured on HGTVs Design Star and they have two daughters. Jason is married to Jessica Zucker, a fertility therapist who created her own line of critically acclaimed pregnancy loss cards. They have a son and a daughter.

While on a special Mother's Day themed episode of @midnight with their mother, Annette, she was asked to pick her favorite son; she picked Randy without any hesitation.

In 2025, Jason Sklar told the audience on After Midnight that the use of ChatGPT would be the end of Wikipedia, and then noted that that fact would end up on Wikipedia.

=== Cheap Seats ===
From 2004 to 2006, Randy and Jason appeared on Cheap Seats, on which they played fictitious ESPN research assistants who end up hosting a comedy show as they comment on odd and notable sporting events from ESPN's extensive library.

Cheap Seats borrowed its format from Mystery Science Theater 3000.

=== Web series ===
The brothers co-wrote with Nick Kroll the web series Layers, directed by Michael Blieden, on which they played twin publicists Larry and Terry Bridge. Their web series Back on Topps was produced by Vuguru, the online production company of Michael Eisner. It won two Streamy Awards.

In 2010, the online network Crackle released Held Up, an original series written by the brothers and starring Kaitlin Olson of It's Always Sunny in Philadelphia. Held Up tells the story of a bored bank teller's life-changing experience when two teams of bumbling bank robbers hold up his branch. They also started hosting a weekly Earwolf podcast series called Sklarbro Country in 2010.

=== SportsCenter ===
The brothers wrote and appeared on ESPN's SportsCenter in a comedic segment called "The Bracket". Randy and Jason occasionally fill in for Jim Rome on The Jim Rome Show on radio. Randy occasionally appeared as a "Forum" guest on ESPN's Jim Rome Is Burning. Currently, the duo make appearances on the Showtime show Rome also hosted by Jim Rome.

=== United Stats of America ===
In 2012, the Sklar brothers hosted a television show on History titled United Stats of America. A "by the numbers" series, it featured interesting statistics about the U.S., mixed with experiments, stunts, and the Sklars' unique brand of humor. After one season, the show is currently on indefinite hiatus. United Stats of America episodes are now available for viewing on Apple TV.

=== Sklarbro Country ===
From August 2010 to 2017 the Sklar Brothers hosted a popular weekly podcast called Sklarbro Country on the Earwolf network. They described the podcast as the intersection of sports, comedy, and indie rock, and the show had guests ranging from Jon Hamm to Terrell Owens to Diablo Cody. Memorable episodes featured Richard Simmons, Patton Oswalt, the end of the year Character Specials, Hamm, Rich Eisen, and Adam Carolla. Sklarbro Country was nominated for best podcast in the televised 2012 Comedy Central Comedy Awards.

In the summer of 2012, the Sklar Brothers added Sklarbro County to their weekly output of the podcast. Described as a shorter midweek snack of an episode, the show is co-hosted by up and coming character comedic actor Dan Van Kirk. Dan finds crazy stories of people doing stupid or silly things and Randy, Jason, and Dan and a guest all riff as if it were a writers' room. Randy has described the show this way: "If a 30-person brawl breaks out at a Chuck E. Cheese in Tampa, FL at a 5-year-old's birthday party and the fight spills over into a Burlington Coat Factory parking lot, ending in someone defecating in an ex-boyfriend's hatchback… we'll be there to make fun of it." Sklarbro County was available weekly on Tuesdays, also on the Earwolf Network.

=== Rome on Showtime ===
The brothers have become a regular staple of Jim Rome's monthly show, Rome on Showtime with a popular segment, titled "Sklarred for Life", where Jim Rome tees up the 6-8 craziest stories of the last month that happened in the world of sports, video clips, photos, arrests, and the brother skewer the subjects.

=== Better Call Saul ===
The Sklar brothers made two cameo appearances on AMC's Better Call Saul as the owners of a music shop who are purchasing television commercials from the suspended lawyer Jimmy McGill.

=== This American Life ===
The brothers were featured on an episode of This American Life titled, "Sklar-Crossed Brothers", in which they investigated a family rumor and lifelong suspicion that their mother had misidentified them at some point in their infancy and their identities were from that point mistakenly switched. After getting an expert comparison of their baby footprints with their adult feet, it was determined that there was no mix up.

=== America's Got Talent ===
The Sklar Brothers later auditioned in season sixteen of America's Got Talent where their comedy act enabled them to advance to the next round. They were not invited to appear in the quarter-finals.

== Stand-up specials ==
The brothers have done three stand up specials in their career. The first two stand-up specials were Comedy Central Presents half-hour stand-up specials that aired on Comedy Central in 2001 and in 2009. In April 2014, the brothers premiered What Are We Talking About, their first one-hour stand up special on Netflix. The material was a culmination of material from the past couple of years, the 2011 album Hendersons and Daughters, and material written as close to two weeks before the special was recorded in Madison, Wisconsin at the Majestic Theater.

== Dumb People Town podcast ==
Since 2017 Randy and Jason have hosted a twice weekly podcast with Daniel Van Kirk called Dumb People Town. They usually have another comedian as a guest to discuss their career and life, and then they go over a few news stories, usually sent in by listeners via social media. These news stories are outrageous in nature, with people often hurting themselves or engaging in other "dumb" behavior.

== Discography ==
- Poppin' the Hood! (2004)
- Sklar Maps (2007)
- Hendersons and Daughters (2011)
- What Are We Talking About (2014)
- Hipster Ghosts (2018)

== Filmography ==
=== Film ===
Year	Title	Role	Notes
1999	Flushed	Both: Arguing Brothers	
2000	The Prime Gig	Randy: Twin #2 Jason: Twin #1	
2000	Citizen Toxie: The Toxic Avenger IV	Randy: Jason Gonzales Jason: Jason Diaz	
2001	See for Yourself	Jason: Adam	Short film
2001	Bubble Boy	Randy: Dawn Jason: Shlomo	
2002	Sucker Shram	Jason: Heinzie	Short film
2002	Parts of the Family	Randy: Jason Gonzales Jason: Jason Diaz	Uncredited Direct-to-video
2003	Melvin Goes to Dinner	Both: Extras	
2004	My Baby's Daddy	Randy: Brotha Stylz #1 Jason: Brotha Stylz #2	
2004	Tales from the Crapper	Randy: Jason Gonzales Jason: Jason Diaz	
2007	Wild Hogs	Randy: Buck Dooble Jason: Earl Dooble	
2007	The Comebacks	Randy: Superfan #2 Jason: Superfan #1	
2009	Overdrawn	Randy: Roger Feldspar	Short film
2011	Talking Hedz	Both	Short film
2011	The Legend of Awesomest Maximus	Randy: Jeff (Testiclees Soldier #2) Jason: Bill (Testiclees Soldier #1)	
2012	Boys	Jason: Guy in Car	Short film
2013	Carlos Spills the Beans	Randy: Fred Boyle Jason: Ted Boyle	
2014	Teacher of the Year	Randy: Clive Hammer Jason: Lowell Hammer	
2016	Sick of it All	Randy: Officer Feltcher Jason: Officer Recum	
2016	Past Forward	Both: Actors	Short film
2016	The Dreidel Masters	Randy: Asher Edelman Jason: Joshua Edelman	Short film
2017	The Evil Within	Randy: Cop #1 Jason: Cop #2	
2017	Security Deposit	Both: Fixer Upper Brothers	Short film
2018	Black Ice	Randy: Commentator 1 Jason: Commentator 2	Short film
TBA	Camp	Randy: Rabbi Randy Jason: Rabbi Jason	

=== Television ===
Year	Title	Role	Notes
1997	Apartment 2F	Randy: Randy Jason: Jason	13 episodes Also writers
1999	It's Like, You Know...	Randy: Justin Jason: Jason	Episode: "Twins"
2000	Action	Randy: Matt Silverstein Jason: Dave Silverstein	Episode: "Dragon's Blood"
2000	Dot Comedy	Both: Hosts	1 episode
2000	BattleBots	Both: Feature Reporters	Season 1
2001	The Oblongs	Randy: Biff Oblong Jason: Chip Oblong	8 episodes
2001	Providence	Randy: Jack Jason: Dan	Episode: "Best Man"
2001	Becker	Randy: Ricky Jason: Donnie	2 episodes
2002	Curb Your Enthusiasm	Jason: Salesman	Episode: "Krazee-Eyez Killa"
2004–2006	Cheap Seats	Both: Hosts	77 episodes Also writers
2004	The Dana & Julia Show	Randy: Rico Jason: Nico	Television film
2005	Law & Order	Randy: Max Finneran Jason: Barry Finneran	Episode: "Dining Out"
2006–2007	Entourage	Randy: Jim Jason: Agent / Rob's Eyesight Tester / Jeff	Episodes: "Three's Company", "Manic Monday" (Jason); "Gary's Desk" (both);
2006	Grey's Anatomy	Randy: Peter Weitzman Jason: Jake Weitzman	Episode: "Don't Stand So Close to Me"
2007	It's Always Sunny in Philadelphia	Randy: Fat Michael Jason: DJ Squirrely D	Episode: "The Gang Dances Their Asses Off"
2008	Held Up	Randy: Robin Jason: Batman	Television film Also writers and executive producers
2008–2009	Back on Topps	Randy: Leyland Topps Jason: Leif Topps	Web series Also executive producers
2009	Glenn Martin DDS	Randy: Sweat Lodge Guy (voice)	Episode: "A Bromantic Getaway"
2010	The Legend of Neil	Both: Armos	Episode: "Fairlyhood"
2010	Childrens Hospital	Both: Themselves	Episode: "The End of the Middle"
2011	Boxes	Randy: Baxter (voice)	Television film
2011	I'm in the Band	Randy: Blaze Jason: Claw	2 episodes
2012	United Stats of America	Both: Themselves	6 episodes Also co-producers
2012	CSI: Crime Scene Investigation	Randy: Jimmy Hicks Jason: Dwayne Hicks	Episode: "Stealing Home"
2012	Tweekly News	Both: Themselves	Web series 10 episodes Also directors
2012	Sketchy	Randy: Pinchas Jason: Morty	Episode: "Rabbi Burger"
2012–2013	Partners	Randy: Nate Blevins Jason: Jordy Blevins	5 episodes
2013–2015	Mighty Med	Randy: Wallace Jason: Clyde	11 episodes
2013	Phineas and Ferb	Randy: Markus Jason: Mark	Episode: "Cheers for Fears/Just Our Luck"
2013	Comedy Bang! Bang!	Both: Reggie's Son	Episode: "Jason Schwartzman Wears a Striped Shirt & High Top Sneakers"
2014	Newsreaders	Randy: Tim Nast Jason: Tom Nerny	Episode: "Strip Club Exposé; Long Lost Twins"
2015	Playing House	Randy: Ronnie Custerman Jason: Conrad Custerman	Episode: "Kimmewah Kup"
2016	Agent Carter	Randy: Director Kenneth	2 episodes
2016	Maron	Both: Themselves	Episode: "Sobriety Bush"
2016	Shady Neighbors	Tom	Television film
2016–2019	Those Who Can't	Randy: Dr. Rick Greene Jason: Dr. Astor Greene	Randy: 8 episodes Jason: 10 episodes
2016, 2018	The 5th Quarter	Randy: Pete Powers Jason: Bill Bass	Episodes: "Sylvester World Peace" (Jason; 2016); "Parkour Boyz" (Randy; 2018)
2017	Better Call Saul	Both: Music Store Owners	2 episodes
2019	Bajillion Dollar Propertie$	Randy: Craigory Jason: Georch	Episode: "Stapler's Monster"
2019	GLOW	Randy: Jerry Zeissman Jason: Lev Zeissman	Episode: "Desert Pollen"
2021	America's Got Talent	Both: Themselves	Episode: "Auditions 5"
2022	What We Do in the Shadows	Both: Toby and Bran	Episode: "Reunited", "Go Flip Yourself"
2025	Night Court	Both: Ryan and Bryan	Episode: "Blood Moonstruck"
