= Rivals: Sport vs. Sport =

- Genre: Reality competition
- Presented by: Lara Pitt; Jack Riewoldt
- Country of origin: Australia
- Original language: English
- No. of seasons: 1
- No. of episodes: 8

Production
- Production locations: Hamilton Island, Queensland, Australia
- Production company: Ronde Media

Original release
- Network: Foxtel; Kayo Sports

Rivals: Sport vs. Sport, stylised as RIVALS, is an Australian sports reality competition show that aired on Foxtel and Kayo Sports between March and April 2026.

== Concept ==
The show, which spans across eight episodes, pits teams from three sports (Australian rules football, rugby union, rugby league) against each other in science-based athletic challenges measuring speed, agility, power, and endurance. Teams accrue points across the various different challenges, which aggregate over the span of series. Each sport is represented by four athletes (two men and two women), competing equally in a large-scale mixed-gender format.

The challenges were designed with oversight from the Australian Institute of Sport (AIS).

== Production and release ==
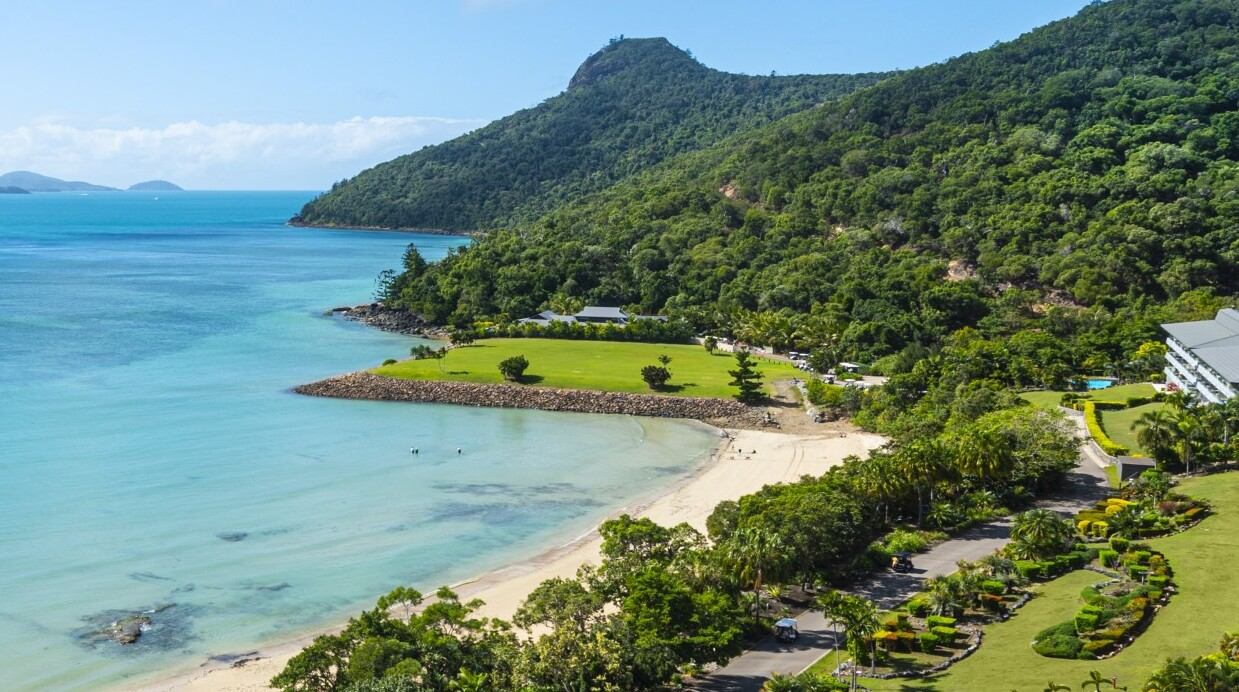
Hamilton Island's Frangipani Lawn was one of the filming locations.

The show was filmed on Hamilton Island in Queensland's Mackay, Isaac and Whitsunday region. Unilever-Rexona is credited as creating the show. It was produced with partners Ronde Media, Octagon, WPP Media, and Motion Entertainment, with Woolworths being a foundation partner.

The show is presented by television presenter Lara Pitt and former Australian Football League (AFL) premiership player for Richmond, Jack Riewoldt.

== Contestants and results ==
=== Teams ===
Team Aussie Rules
Athlete	Age	Position	Team
Will Ashcroft	6 May 2004 (aged 21)	Midfielder	Brisbane Lions (AFL)
Monique Conti	9 December 1999 (aged 26)	Midfielder	Richmond (AFLW)
Scott Pendlebury	7 January 1988 (aged 38)	Midfielder	Collingwood (AFL)
Matilda Scholz	29 April 2005 (aged 20)	Ruck	Port Adelaide (AFLW)

Team Rugby Union
Athlete	Age	Position	Team
Ashley Marsters	2 November 1993 (aged 32)	Hooker	Western Force (Super Rugby W)
Desiree Miller	13 January 2002 (aged 24)	Wing	New South Wales Waratahs (Super Rugby W)
Joseph-Aukuso Sua'ali'i	1 August 2003 (aged 22)	Centre	New South Wales Waratahs (Super Rugby)
Harry Wilson	22 November 1999 (aged 26)	Flanker	Queensland Reds (Super Rugby)

Team Rugby League
Athlete	Age	Position	Team
Josh Addo-Carr	28 July 1995 (aged 30)	Wing	Parramatta Eels (NRL)
Ali Brigginshaw	1 December 1989 (aged 36)	Halfback	Brisbane Broncos (NRLW)
Jaime Chapman	17 March 2002 (aged 23)	Centre	Gold Coast Titans (NRLW)
Reece Walsh	10 July 2002 (aged 23)	Fullback	Brisbane Broncos (NRL)

=== Results ===
Leaderboard
Challenge Team	Rounds						Pts	Finals	
Challenge Team	1	2	3	4	5	6	Pts	EF	GF
Team Rugby Union	3	1	1	6	3	5	19	Bye	Champions
Team Aussie Rules	5	3	5	3	0	Dis.	16	Eliminated	
Team Rugby League	1	5	3	0	5	Dis.	14	Won	Runners-up

== See also ==
- Australia's Greatest Athlete
