= Apartment 2F =

- Genre: Comedy
- Directed by: Pamela Dresser
- Starring: Randy and Jason Sklar
- Country of origin: United States
- Original language: English
- No. of seasons: 1
- No. of episodes: 13

Production
- Running time: 23 minutes

Original release
- Network: MTV
- Release: July 13 – October 7, 1997

Apartment 2F, often written Apt. 2F, is a 1997 MTV sitcom, sketch comedy and stand-up television series about the escapades of Randy and Jason Sklar's characters in New York City. The series aired from July 13 to November 1997.

== Cast ==
The series included appearances by comedic actors, Amy Poehler, Stephen Colbert, Lewis Black, Bill Burr, Zach Galifianakis and Godfrey.

The writers included Randy & Jason Sklar, Vito Viscomi, Mike Royce, Michael Lee, Brian Frazer, Eric Friedman and Katty Biscone.

== Reception ==
Reviewing the first episode, Carole Horst of Variety magazine said the show is a "wildly unfunny sitcom" that "looks more like a TV Land reject than an MTV-sanctioned production". She goes on to say that "while exhibiting nice brotherly chemistry and comic timing", the Sklar brothers "have transferred characters and bits from their New York stage shows to a boringly traditional sitcom setup". On the other hand, The Hollywood Reporter suggested that the Sklar brothers "could be the Seinfelds of the late '90s".
