= SportsCenterU =

SportsCenterU is the college version of ESPN's flagship program SportsCenter which airs exclusively on ESPNU. The college sports news and highlight show focuses on reports of the day from men's and women's intercollegiate athletics including football, basketball, softball, baseball, lacrosse, volleyball, wrestling, and hockey.

== History ==
The program was announced in March 2006 as a weeknight series designed to give ESPNU its own version of SportsCenter, positioned as a daily hub for college sports coverage.

Although originally planned as a daily program, SportsCenterU primarily airs Thursdays–Saturdays during the college football season and after ESPN's Saturday Primetime college basketball games. It is also broadcast before and after major events such as conference championship games and national championships. Most selection specials, such as those for the NCAA Division I softball tournament and men's lacrosse tournament, have aired under the SportsCenterU banner.

In 2025, ESPN highlighted SportsCenterU as part of ESPNU’s broader role in elevating college sports coverage when celebrating the network’s 20th anniversary.

== See also ==
- SportsCenter
