= BattleBots season 1 =

BattleBots
- Season 1
- No. of episodes: 15

Release
- Original network: Comedy Central
- Original release: August 23 – November 29, 2000

Season chronology
- Next → Season 2

Season 1 of the American competitive television series BattleBots premiered on Comedy Central on August 23, 2000. Season 1 was hosted by Bil Dwyer and Sean Salisbury. Legendary boxing ring announcer and radio host Mark Beiro acted as the BattleBots arena announcer. Donna D'Errico, along with twins Randy and Jason Sklar were the arena-side correspondents.

The pilot, known as "episode one", was originally aired as a pay-per-view event before being pitched to network executives.

== Classifications ==
Robots in season 1 competed in four separate weight classes:

- Lightweight – Contestants
- Middleweight – Contestants
- Heavyweight – Contestants
- Super Heavyweight – Contestants

== Lightweight ==
=== Qualifying ===
Only one match in the lightweight category was aired during the qualifying round. The winner of each battle moved on to the Round of 16 along with eight teams that were automatically qualified.

Episode	Battle	Winner	Loser	Method	Time
Unaired	1	Afterthought	Black Widow	KO	N/A
Unaired	2	The Missing Link	Chiabot	KO	2:20
Unaired	3	Das Bot	Rott-Bott 2000	KO	1:02
Unaired	4	Sallad	The Aggressive Polygon	Judges' Decision (9–0)	3:00
Unaired	5	Alpha Raptor	Cereal Box Killer	KO	N/A
Unaired	6	Pestilence	Thorn	KO	2:35
Unaired	7	Shaft	Gremlin ll	KO	2:20
1	8	Backlash	Disposable Hero	KO	0:50

The robot was the winner of the battle.
The robot was the loser of the battle and was eliminated.

Advance to the Round of 16 without battle
The Crusher, Endotherm, Ziggo, Shrike, Tentoumushi, Dr. Inferno Jr., No Tolerance ll, and Mouser Mecha-Catbot

=== Tournament ===
Lightweight Tournament Bracket

Round of 16
Backlash
The Crusher
Afterthought
Endotherm
Ziggo
Missing Link
Das Bot
Shrike
Sallad
Tentoumushi
Alpha Raptor
Dr. Inferno Jr.
Pestilence
No Tolerance II
Mouser Mecha-Catbot
Shaft

Quarter-finals
Backlash
Endotherm
Ziggo
Das Bot
Tentoumushi
Alpha Raptor
No Tolerance II
Mouser Mecha-Catbot

Semi-finals
Backlash
Das Bot
Alpha Raptor
Mouser Mecha-Catbot

Championship
Backlash
Alpha Raptor

Episode	Battle	Winner	Loser	Method	Time
Round of 16
Unaired	1	Endotherm	Afterthought	Judges' Decision (8–1)	3:00
Unaired	2	Das Bot	Shrike	Judges' Decision (9–0)	3:00
Unaired	3	Alpha Raptor	Dr. Inferno Jr.	Judges' Decision (8–1)	3:00
Unaired	4	No Tolerance II	Pestilence	KO	2:40
1	5	Tentoumushi	Sallad	Judges' Decision (7–2)	3:00
2	6	Ziggo	The Missing Link	KO	1:18
4	7	Mouser; Mecha-Catbot	Shaft	Judges' Decision (6–3)	3:00
5	8	Backlash	The Crusher	KO	1:43
Quarterfinals
Unaired	1	Backlash	Endotherm	Judges' Decision (7–2)	3:00
Unaired	2	Das Bot	Ziggo	KO	1:17
Unaired	3	Mouser; Mecha-Catbot	No Tolerance II	Judges' Decision (9–0)	3:00
7	4	Alpha Raptor	Tentoumushi	Judges' Decision (7–2)	3:00
Semifinals
9	1	Alpha Raptor	Mouser; Mecha-Catbot	Judges' Decision (8–1)	3:00
9	2	Backlash	Das Bot	KO	0:57
9	Finals				
9	1	Backlash	Alpha Raptor	KO	1:24

The robot was the winner the battle.
The robot was the loser of the battle and was eliminated.
The robot became the winner of "BattleBots" for the lightweight classification.

== Middleweight ==
=== Qualifying ===
Two matches in the middleweight category were aired during the qualifying round. The winner of each battle moved on to the Quarterfinals along with four teams that were automatically qualified.

Episode	Battle	Winner	Loser	Method	Time
Unaired	1	Hazard	Pegleg	KO	0:31
Unaired	2	Alien Gladiator	The Emasculator	FF	—N/a
4	3	Pressure Drop	Subject to Change Without Reason	KO	1:21
5	4	Blade Runner	Bad Attitude	KO	1:24

The robot was the winner the battle.
The robot was the loser of the battle and was eliminated.

Advance to the Quarterfinals without battle
Turtle Road Kill, Spin Orbiting Force, Deadblow, and Ankle Biter

=== Tournament ===
Middleweight Tournament Bracket

Quarter-finals
Hazard
Turtle Road Kill
Blade Runner
Super Orbiting Force
Alien Gladiator
Deadblow
Pressure Drop
Ankle Biter

Semi-finals
Hazard
Super Orbiting Force
Deadblow
Pressure Drop

Championship
Hazard
Deadblow

Episode	Battle	Winner	Loser	Method	Time
Quarterfinals
8	1	Deadblow	Alien Gladiator	KO	1:08
8	2	Pressure Drop	Ankle Biter	KO	2:20
10	3	Hazard	Turtle Road Kill	Judges' Decision (9–0)	3:00
10	4	Spin Orbiting Force	Blade Runner	Judges' Decision (5–4)	3:00
Semifinals
12	1	Deadblow	Pressure Drop	Judges' Decision (9–0)	3:00
13	2	Hazard	Spin Orbiting Force	Judges' Decision (7–2)	3:00
Finals
14	1	Hazard	Deadblow	KO	0:53

The robot was the winner the battle.
The robot was the loser of the battle and was eliminated.
The robot became the winner of "BattleBots" for the middleweight classification.

== Heavyweight ==
=== Qualifying ===
The winner of each battle moved on to the Round of 16 along with twelve teams that were automatically qualified.

Episode	Battle	Winner	Loser	Method	Time
Unaired	1	Vlad the Impaler	GoldDigger	FF	—N/a
Unaired	2	Punjar	Mr. Bonestripper	FF	—N/a
3	4	KillerHurtz	Knome II	KO	1:03
6	3	BioHazard	Mjollnir	Judges' Decision (9-0)	3:00

The robot was the winner the battle.
The robot was the loser of the battle and was eliminated.

Advance to the Round of 16 without battle
Tazbot, frenZy, OverKill, Kill-O-Amp, Suicidal Tendencies, Gammatron, Blendo, Voltarc, Bender, Monster, Nightmare, and Mauler

=== Tournament ===
Heavyweight Tournament Bracket

Round of 16
Vlad the Impaler
Tazbot
frenZy
OverKill
Punjar
Kill-O-Amp
Gammatron
Suicidal Tendencies
Blendo
BioHazard
Voltarc
Bender
Monster
KillerHurtz
Mauler
Nightmare

Quarter-finals
Vlad the Impaler
OverKill
Punjar
Gammatron
BioHazard
Voltarc
KillerHurtz
Mauler

Semi-finals
Vlad the Impaler
Punjar
Voltarc
KillerHurtz

Championship
Vlad the Impaler
Voltarc

Episode	Battle	Winner	Loser	Method	Time
Round of 16
Unaired	1	Punjar	Kill-O-Amp	Judges' Decision (5-4)	3:00
Unaired	2	Gammatron	Suicidal Tendencies	Judges' Decision (6-3)	3:00
Unaired	3	BioHazard	Blendo	KO	—N/a
Unaired	4	KillerHurtz	Monster	KO	—N/a
2	5	OverKill	frenZy	Judges' Decision (7-2)	3:00
2	6	Mauler	Nightmare	KO	0:40
3	7	Voltarc	Bender	Judges' Decision (9-0)	3:00
4	8	Vlad the Impaler	Tazbot	Judges' Decision (9-0)	3:00
Quarterfinals
7	1	Voltarc	BioHazard	Judges' Decision (9-0)	3:00
11	2	Vlad the Impaler	OverKill	Judges' Decision (8-1)	3:00
11	3	Punjar	Gammatron	Judges' Decision (7-2)	3:00
11	4	KillerHurtz	Mauler	KO	—N/a
Semifinals
12	1	Vlad the Impaler	Punjar	Judges' Decision (8–1)	3:00
13	2	Voltarc	KillerHurtz	Judges' Decision (8–1)	3:00
Finals
14	1	Vlad the Impaler	Voltarc	KO	1:42

The robot was the winner the battle.
The robot was the loser of the battle and was eliminated.
The robot became the winner of "BattleBots" for the heavyweight classification.

== Superheavyweight ==
=== Qualifying ===
Three matches in the Super Heavyweight category were aired during the qualifying round. The winner of each battle moved on to the Quarterfinals along with one team that was automatically qualified.

Episode	Battle	Winner	Loser	Method	Time
Unaired	1	Mechadon	Prompt Critical	KO	1:55
Unaired	2	Rammstein	Abbatoir	KO	—N/a
Unaired	3	Ginsu	World Peace	FF	—N/a
Unaired	4	Ronin	Odin	Judges' Decision (6-3)	3:00
3	5	Minion	Gray Matter	Judges' Decision (7-2)	3:00
5	6	Grendel	Diesector	KO	1:38
6	7	DooAll	S.L.A.M.	KO	2:51

The robot was the winner the battle.
The robot was the loser of the battle and was eliminated.

Advance to the Quarterfinals without battle
Super Rhino

=== Tournament ===
Super Heavyweight Tournament Bracket

Quarter-finals
Minion
Grendel
Mechadon
Rammstein
Ginsu
Ronin
DooAll
Super Rhino

Semi-finals
Minion
Rammstein
Ronin
DooAll

Championship
Minion
DooAll

Episode	Battle	Winner	Loser	Method	Time
Quarterfinals
Unaired	1	DooAll	Super Rhino	Judges' Decision (5-4)	3:00
7	2	Rammstein	Mechadon	Judges' Decision (8-1)	3:00
8	3	Minion	Grendel	Judges' Decision (7-2)	3:00
10	4	Ronin	Ginsu	Judges' Decision (7-2)	3:00
Semifinals
12	1	Minion	Rammstein	KO	1:29
13	2	DooAll	Ronin	KO	1:46
Finals
14	1	Minion	DooAll	Judges' Decision (9-0)	3:00

The robot was the winner the battle.
The robot was the loser of the battle and was eliminated.
The robot became the winner of "BattleBots" for the Super heavyweight classification.

=== Episodes ===
No. overall	No. in season	Battle 1	Battle 2	Battle 3	Original release date
1	1	Backlash vs. Disposable Hero (Lightweight round of 32)	Tentoumushi vs. Sallad (Lightweight round of 16)	N/A	August 23, 2000
2	2	The Missing Link vs. Ziggo (Lightweight round of 16)	Nightmare vs. Mauler (Heavyweight round of 16)	Overkill vs. frenZy (Heavyweight round of 16)	August 30, 2000
3	3	Voltarc vs. Bender (Heavyweight round of 16)	KillerHurtz vs. Knome II (Heavyweight round of 32)	Minion vs. Gray Matter (Superheavyweight round 16)	September 6, 2000
4	4	Pressure Drop vs. Subject to Change Without Reason (Middleweight round of 16)	Shaft vs. Mouser Mecha-Catbot (Lightweight round of 16)	Vlad the Impaler vs. Tazbot (Heavyweight round of 16)	September 13, 2000
5	5	Backlash vs. The Crusher (Lightweight round of 16)	Blade Runner vs. Bad Attitude (Middleweight round of 16)	Diesector vs. Grendel (Superheavyweight round of 16)	September 20, 2000
6	6	DooAll vs. S.L.A.M. (Superheavyweight round of 16)	BioHazard vs. Mjollnir (Heavyweight round of 32)	Lightweight Rumble	September 27, 2000
7	7	Voltarc vs. BioHazard (Heavyweight Quarter-Finals)	Mechadon vs. Rammstein (Superheavyweight Quarter-Finals)	Alpha Raptor vs. Tentoumushi (Lightweight Quarter-Finals)	October 4, 2000
8	8	Alien Gladiator vs. Deadblow (Middleweight Quarter-Finals)	Ankle Biter vs. Pressure Drop (Middleweight Quarter-Finals)	Grendel vs. Minion (Superheavyweight Quarter-Finals)	October 11, 2000
9	9	Mouser Mecha-Catbot vs. Alpha Raptor (Lightweight Semi-Finals)	Das Bot vs. Backlash (Lightweight Semi-Finals)	Alpha Raptor vs. Backlash (Lightweight Finals)	October 18, 2000
10	10	Spin Orbiting Force vs. Blade Runner (Middleweight Quarter-Finals)	Hazard vs. Turtle Road Kill (Middleweight Quarter-Finals)	Ginsu vs. Ronin (Superheavyweight Quarter-Finals)	October 25, 2000
11	11	Vlad the Impaler vs. OverKill (Heavyweight Quarter-Finals)	Gammatron vs. Punjar (Heavyweight Quarter-Finals)	KillerHurtz vs Mauler (Heavyweight Quarter-Finals)	November 8, 2000
12	12	Vlad the Impaler vs. Punjar (Heavyweight Semi-Finals)	Deadblow vs. Pressure Drop (Middleweight Semi-Finals)	Minion vs. Rammstein (Superheavyweight Semi-Finals)	November 15, 2000
13	13	Spin Orbiting Force vs. Hazard (Middleweight Semi-finals)	KillerHurtz vs. Voltarc (Heavyweight Semi-finals)	Ronin vs. DooAll (Superheavyweight Semi-Finals)	November 22, 2000
14	14	Deadblow vs. Hazard (Middleweight Finals)	Vlad the Impaler vs. Voltarc (Heavyweight Finals)	Minion vs. DooAll (Superheavyweight Finals)	November 29, 2000
15	15	Middleweight Rumble	Heavyweight Rumble	N/A	December 5, 2000
