= Chris Spielman =

American football player, coach, and executive (born 1965)

- Spielman in 2023

Detroit Lions
- Title: Special assistant to the owner and CEO

Personal information
- Born: October 11, 1965 (age 61); Canton, Ohio, U.S.
- Listed height: 6 ft 0 in (1.83 m)
- Listed weight: 247 lb (112 kg)

Career information
- Position: Linebacker (No. 54)
- High school: Massillon Washington (Massillon, Ohio)
- College: Ohio State (1984–1987)
- NFL draft: 1988: 2nd round, 29th overall pick

Career history

Playing
- Detroit Lions (1988–1995); Buffalo Bills (1996–1997); Cleveland Browns (1999)*
- * Offseason or practice squad member only

Coaching
- Columbus Destroyers (2005) Head coach

Operations
- Detroit Lions (2020–present) Special assistant to the owner and CEO

Awards and highlights
- First-team All-Pro (1991); 2× Second-team All-Pro (1992, 1994); 4× Pro Bowl (1989–1991, 1994); NFL solo tackles co-leader (1994); PFWA All-Rookie Team (1988); Pride of the Lions; Detroit Lions 75th Anniversary Team; Detroit Lions All-Time Team; Unanimous All-American (1987); Consensus All-American (1986); First-team All-American (1985); Lombardi Award (1987); Chic Harley Award (1987); 3× First-team All-Big Ten (1985, 1986, 1987); First-team AP All-Time All-American (2025)

Career NFL statistics
- Tackles: 1,363
- Sacks: 10.5
- Forced fumbles: 13
- Interceptions: 6
- Stats at Pro Football Reference
- College Football Hall of Fame

Charles Christopher Spielman (born October 11, 1965) is an American former professional football player who is a special assistant to the owner and CEO for the Detroit Lions of the National Football League (NFL). He played linebacker for the Ohio State Buckeyes, twice earning All-American honors. He played professional football for the Detroit Lions in the NFL, where he was a three-time All-Pro. He also played for the Buffalo Bills and Cleveland Browns, and coached for the Arena Football League (AFL)'s Columbus Destroyers. He was a broadcaster for Fox Sports and ESPN from 1999 to 2020.

== Football career ==
In 1984, Spielman graduated from Washington High School in Massillon, Ohio, where he was awarded the Dial Award for the national high-school scholar-athlete of the year in 1983. He was the first high school athlete to have his picture on a box of Wheaties. For college, Spielman initially wanted to attend the University of Michigan, but his father, a lifelong fan of the Ohio State Buckeyes (Michigan's arch-rival), strongly opposed the idea. Spielman recounted the story in the HBO Documentary "Michigan vs. Ohio State: The Rivalry":

My dad said, "Okay, where are you going to go?" I said, "Dad, I want to go to Michigan." And he said, "You traitor. I'll tell you where you're going. You're going right down 71 South and you're going to play for the Ohio State Buckeyes... Better not go there [Michigan]. Don't ever come home if you do."

Spielman was a three-time All-American at Ohio State, intercepted 11 passes, and won the Lombardi Award as the best college football lineman or linebacker. He was the Ohio State football team MVP his senior year and won the Touchdown Club of Columbus's Chic Harley Award. He graduated from Ohio State with a degree in recreation education.

Pre-draft measurables
Height	Weight	Hand span	40-yard dash	10-yard split	20-yard split	20-yard shuttle	Vertical jump	Broad jump	Bench press
6 ft 0 in (1.83 m)	234 lb (106 kg)	9 1/4 in (0.23 m)	4.90 s	1.71 s	2.87 s	4.13 s	32.5 in (0.83 m)	9 ft 1 in (2.77 m)	23 reps
All values from NFL Combine

In the 1988 NFL draft, Spielman was drafted in the second round with the 29th overall pick by the Detroit Lions. Spielman played eight seasons with the Lions (1988–95), where he was a defensive stalwart during the team's run to four playoff appearances, two NFC Central titles, and a berth in the 1991 NFC Championship Game. He captained the Lions' defense that was one of the best statistically in the NFL in the mid-1990s. Spielman is the franchise's all-time leader in career tackles with 1,138 (since the team began recording tackles statistically in 1973.) He also recorded 10 sacks, four interceptions, 30 pass defenses, 13 forced fumbles and 17 fumble recoveries during his Lions' career. He was the first Lion to lead the team in tackles seven consecutive seasons since 1973, including the team's highest single-season tally 195 tackles in 1994.

Spielman represented the Lions in four Pro Bowls (1990–92, 1995) and was named the team's defensive MVP in 1993 and 1994. He played for the Buffalo Bills in 1996 and 1997. His 1997 season was limited because of a neck injury that required spinal surgery.

He chose to miss the 1998 season to assist his wife battling cancer.

He returned to the NFL in the 1999 season, with the Cleveland Browns. He retired before the regular season began, after suffering another neck injury. Spielman is also notable for being one of the players notable NFL draft "guru" Mel Kiper, Jr. has "missed" on, Kiper admitting in a 2001 post that he had underrated the linebacker. In April 2009 Spielman was elected into the College Football Hall of Fame. His induction came in July 2010. In 2012, he appeared in an episode of the NFL Network show A Football Life. The episode celebrated his prowess on the field as well as his dedication to his family.

On October 21, 2021, the Detroit Lions announced they were inducting Spielman into their "Pride of the Lions" club, which honors the greatest players in their history.

== Broadcasting career ==
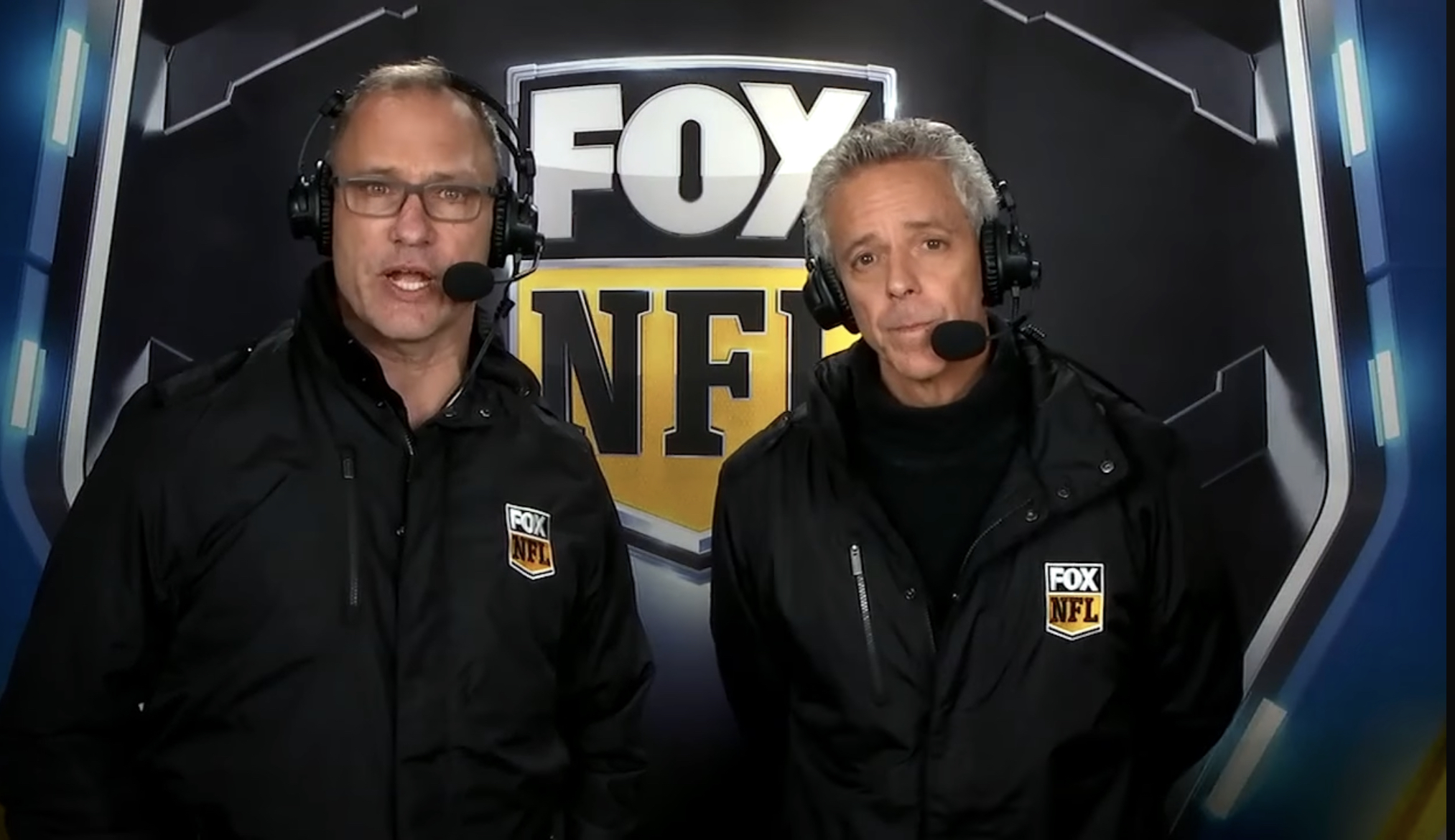
Spielman (left) with play-by-play announcer Thom Brennaman during the 2018 NFL season.

Spielman's broadcasting career started in 1999, as an NFL studio-show analyst for Fox Sports Net. After two years with FSN, Spielman joined ESPN in 2001. He served primarily as a color analyst for college football broadcasts, as well as studio analyst for college football. Spielman is also a contributor to the Columbus-based FM radio station 97.1 The Fan, an ESPN Radio affiliate. He previously hosted the show Spielman on Sports. Spielman used to appear every Tuesday afternoon on AM 1270 WXYT, a sports-talk radio station out of Detroit. Spielman has served as a color analyst for the Detroit Lions during the NFL preseason. In 2006, Spielman hosted a reality series on ESPNU called Summer House.

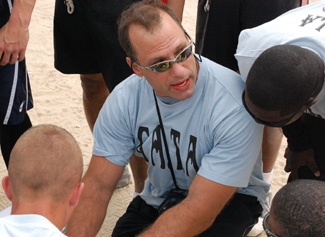
Spielman in 2008

In 2016, Fox Sports announced that Spielman had joined Fox NFL coverage as a game analyst alongside veteran play-by-play announcer Dick Stockton and sideline reporter Kristina Pink. On select weeks, he also teamed up with Thom Brennaman and Charles Davis in a three-man booth.

== Coaching career ==
After the 2000 season, Spielman interviewed for the vacant Ohio State head coaching position previously held by John Cooper; however, the job eventually went to Jim Tressel. In 2005, Spielman coached the Columbus Destroyers of the Arena Football League to a 2–14 record.

== Executive career ==
Spielman was hired by the Detroit Lions as special assistant to chairman and president & CEO on December 15, 2020.

== NFL career statistics ==
Legend
	Led the league
**Bold**	Career high

=== Regular season ===
Year	Team	Games		Tackles				Interceptions			Fumbles	
Year	Team	GP	GS	Cmb	Solo	Ast	Sck	Int	Yds	TD	FF	FR
1988	DET	**16**	**16**	153	–	–	0.0	0	0	0	1	1
1989	DET	**16**	**16**	125	–	–	**5.0**	0	0	0	1	2
1990	DET	12	12	108	–	–	2.0	1	12	0	1	2
1991	DET	**16**	**16**	126	–	–	1.0	0	0	0	**3**	**3**
1992	DET	**16**	**16**	146	–	–	1.0	0	0	0	0	1
1993	DET	**16**	**16**	148	–	–	0.5	**2**	-2	0	1	2
1994	DET	**16**	**16**	**195**	**124**	**71**	0.0	0	0	0	**3**	**3**
1995	DET	**16**	**16**	137	90	47	1.0	1	4	0	2	**3**
1996	BUF	**16**	**16**	157	111	46	0.0	1	**14**	0	1	2
1997	BUF	8	8	68	50	18	0.0	1	8	0	0	0
Career		148	148	1,363	375	182	10.5	6	36	0	13	19

== Personal life ==
Spielman and his first wife Stefanie had four children. Stefanie survived four bouts with breast cancer, during which both she and her husband were active in raising funds for breast cancer research. While undergoing treatment, she lost her hair, prompting Spielman to shave his head in a show of solidarity. Stefanie died on November 19, 2009, after the disease returned for the fifth time.

In 2013, Spielman married Carrie Yocom, and adopted her two daughters. The family resides in Upper Arlington, a suburb of Columbus, Ohio.

His son Noah played football for Wheaton College. His daughter, Macy, played basketball for Ashland University.

His elder brother is Rick Spielman, former general manager of the Minnesota Vikings. Rick's son, JD, played football for Nebraska and TCU.
