= José Oquendo =

Puerto Rican baseball player and coach (born 1963)

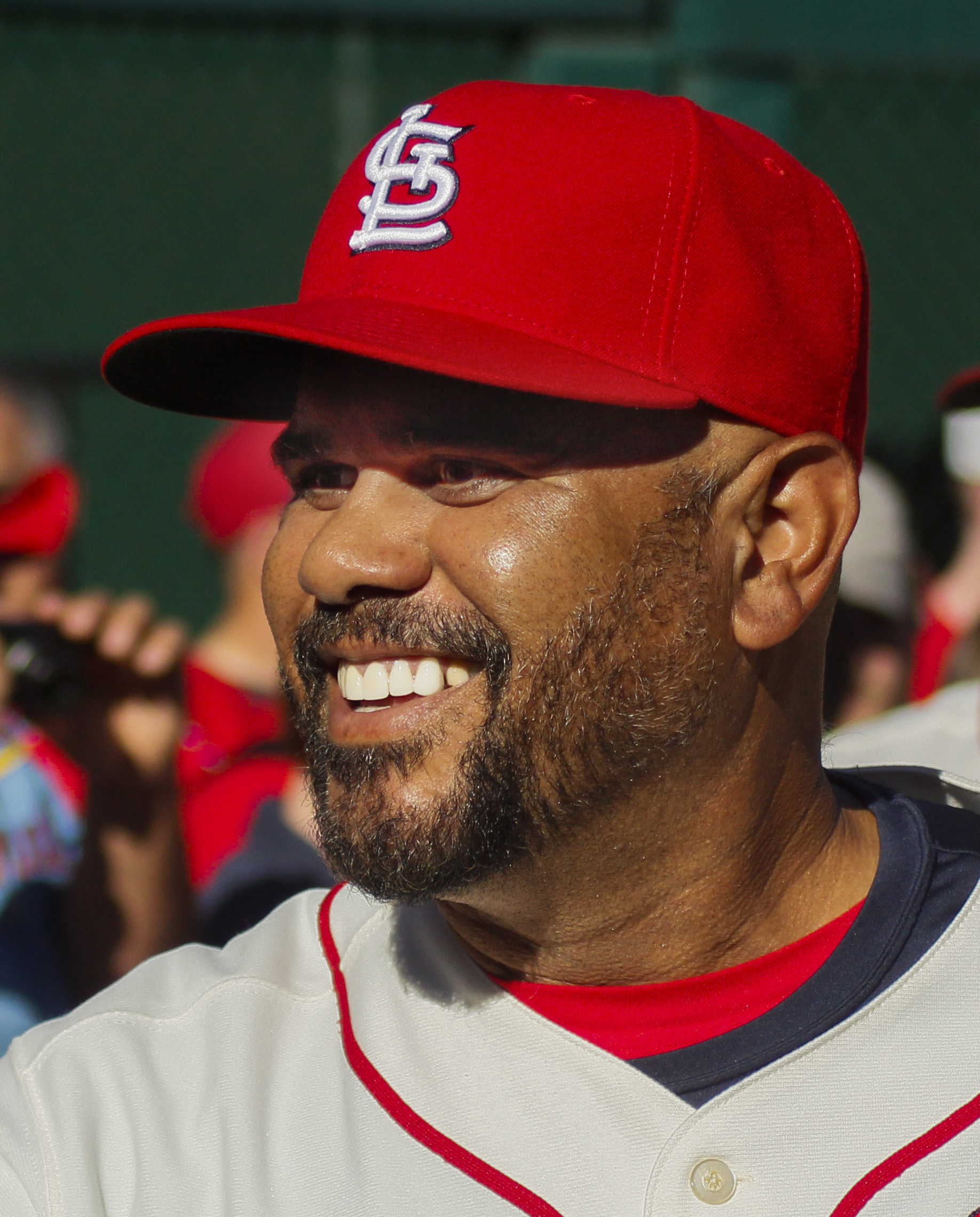
- Oquendo with the St. Louis Cardinals in 2013
- Utility player / Coach
- Born: July 4, 1963 (age 62); Río Piedras, Puerto Rico
- Batted: Switch Threw: Right

MLB debut
- May 2, 1983, for the New York Mets

Last MLB appearance
- September 29, 1995, for the St. Louis Cardinals

MLB statistics
- Batting average: .256
- Home runs: 14
- Runs batted in: 254
- Stats at Baseball Reference

Teams
- As player: New York Mets (1983–1984); St. Louis Cardinals (1986–1995); As coach: St. Louis Cardinals (1999–2015, 2018, 2020)

Career highlights and awards
- 2× World Series champion (2006, 2011); St. Louis Cardinals Hall of Fame

José Manuel Oquendo Contreras (born July 4, 1963), nicknamed "the Secret Weapon", is a Puerto Rican professional baseball coach and former utility player who is the fundamentals coordinator of the St. Louis Cardinals of Major League Baseball (MLB). He played 12 seasons in MLB for the New York Mets and Cardinals, and has coached in various roles within the Cardinals' organization since his retirement, most notably as third base coach for 18 seasons. Oquendo also managed the Puerto Rico national team in the 2006 and 2009 World Baseball Classics.

As a player, Oquendo was known for his versatile defense: he played primarily second base and shortstop, but also frequently in right field, and made at least one appearance at every position. Oquendo has the second-highest career fielding percentage for second basemen at .9919 (99.19%), behind only Plácido Polanco's career mark of .9927 (99.27%).

From Rio Piedras, Puerto Rico, Oquendo was signed by the New York Mets as an amateur free agent in 1979 at age 15. He made his MLB debut with the Mets in 1983 and was traded to the Cardinals in 1985. In 1988, he made his catching debut, giving him an appearance at every position. From 1989 to 1991, he was the Cardinals' regular second baseman alongside shortstop Ozzie Smith. Oquendo's best season offensively came in 1989, when he batted .291, 28 doubles, .747 on-base plus slugging percentage (OPS) and a major-league leading 163 games played. In 1990, he produced his best season defensively, recording the fewest errors (three) for a second baseman in a season with at least 150 games played.

Following his playing career, Oquendo coached and managed in the Cardinals' Minor League Baseball system in 1997 and 1998, and became their bench coach at the major league level the following year. In 2000, he became the Cardinals' third base coach, remaining in that role until 2015, while helping lead the club to 11 playoff appearances, including World Series championships in 2006 and 2011 and four National League pennants. He missed the 2016 season after sustaining a knee injury that required surgery and rehabilitation; at the time, he was the longest-tenured coach in MLB. In 2017, he began serving as a special assistant to Cardinals general manager Mike Girsch, instructing at the Cardinals training facility in Jupiter, Florida. For the 2018 season, he returned to the Cardinals major league team to serve as third base coach. In 2019, he became the Cardinals' minor league infield coordinator. In 2020, he temporarily returned as third base coach. In 2023, he was elected to the Cardinals Hall of Fame . In 2026, he became the organization's fundamentals coordinator.

== Playing career ==
=== New York Mets ===
Oquendo was born in Río Piedras, Puerto Rico, and signed with the New York Mets as an amateur free agent in 1979 at only fifteen years old. A switch hitter, Oquendo threw right-handed and stood 5 feet 10 inches (1.78 m) tall and weighed 160 pounds (73 kg) during his playing career. After two seasons bouncing back and forth between the Mets and their Triple-A affiliate the Tidewater Tides, Oquendo was traded with Mark J. Davis to the St. Louis Cardinals for Ángel Salazar and John Young.

=== St. Louis Cardinals ===
Oquendo spent all of 1985 with the Cardinals' triple A affiliate the Louisville Redbirds. With the Mets, Oquendo had only ever played shortstop; with perennial All-star Ozzie Smith firmly entrenched there, the Cards experimented with Oquendo at other positions when they brought him up for the 1986 season. Along with short, Oquendo played second base, third and in the outfield.

In 1987, Oquendo played every position, except catcher, and was nicknamed "the Secret Weapon" by manager Whitey Herzog. His one emergency appearance on the mound came on August 7. Already down 12–4 to the Philadelphia Phillies, Oquendo pitched the eighth inning and gave up three earned runs. Oquendo reached the postseason for the only time in his career in 1987. He batted .222, including a three-run home run in the second inning of the seventh game of the 1987 National League Championship Series against the San Francisco Giants; the Cardinals would appear in the 1987 World Series, falling to the Minnesota Twins in seven games.

In 1988, Oquendo became one of only a handful of players to have played every position on the diamond when he made his debut behind the plate. He also took the mound again, this time it was in a nineteen inning marathon against the Atlanta Braves on May 14. After pitching three scoreless innings, Oquendo was tagged for a two-run double by Ken Griffey in the nineteenth, and took the loss.

With Luis Alicea back in the minors in 1989, Oquendo emerged as the Cardinals' regular second baseman. He responded by committing only five errors in 851 chances and a .994 fielding percentage. He also enjoyed his best season with the bat, batting .291, and was in the top ten in hits, triples, walks and on-base percentage. He also played in a league leading 163 games that season.

His best season with the glove was the following season, when he set a major league record for the fewest errors (three) by a second baseman in a 150+ game season—the record has since been broken by Plácido Polanco (2009) and Darwin Barney (2012), who recorded only two errors in their respective seasons.

In the first game of the 1992 season, Oquendo suffered a hamstring injury that sidelined him for most of the season. Oquendo spent three more seasons with the Cardinals as a utility infielder. He retired after failing to make the Cardinal roster out of spring training in 1996.

=== Career statistics ===
Games	PA	AB	Runs	Hits	2B	3B	HR	RBI	SB	CS	BB	HBP	SO	Avg.	OBP	Fld%
1190	3737	3202	339	821	104	24	14	254	35	33	448	5	376	.256	.346	.983

Oquendo was 0–1 with a 12.00 earned run average over six innings in three games pitched. His career fielding percentage as a second baseman is .992.

== Coaching career ==
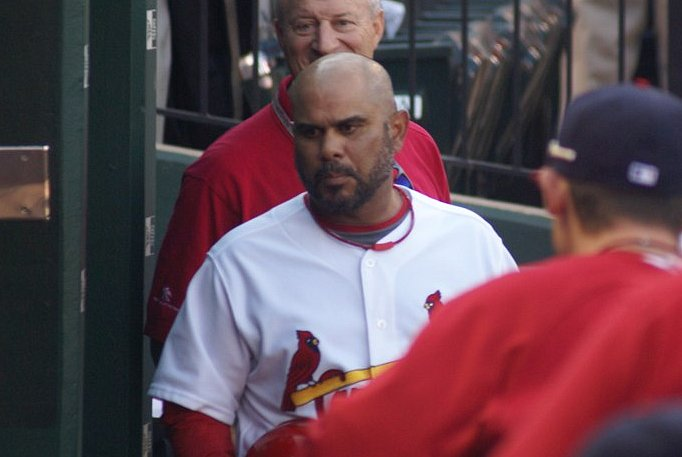
Oquendo in 2009

Oquendo accepted a minor league coaching position with the Cardinals in 1997, and became manager of the New Jersey Cardinals of the New York–Penn League in 1998. He became bench coach for St. Louis in 1999, and a year later, he moved to third base coach, where he remained for the rest of his coaching career.

Oquendo was thrown out of a game against the Philadelphia Phillies on June 13, 2008, for arguing. Earlier in the game, already a blowout loss for the Cardinals, Cardinals pitcher Russ Springer threw an inside pitch that grazed the hip of Phillies first baseman Ryan Howard. Springer was thrown out without warning, which caused Cardinals manager Tony La Russa to argue with umpire Larry Vanover. La Russa was subsequently thrown out of the game, and bench coach Joe Petini assumed the role of manager. Later in the game, Phillies pitcher Rudy Seánez threw a pitch that went behind Cardinals batter Brendan Ryan and was not ejected or warned. Oquendo began arguing from his position in the coaching box behind third and was tossed by Vanover.

On April 4, 2009, Oquendo appeared as a Cardinals pinch hitter in a preseason exhibition game against the Cardinals' Triple-A affiliate, the Memphis Redbirds. Oquendo fouled off several pitches before being walked. He was advanced to third base on a hit and walk before an inning-ending groundout.

Over the past few years Oquendo has interviewed for managerial positions with San Diego, Seattle, and the New York Mets. Also during the 2011 offseason he was interviewed for the managing position with the Cardinals. The spot would later go to Mike Matheny.

On August 17, 2012, Oquendo was again ejected from a game for arguing balls and strikes. After a called strike to Jon Jay from Pittsburgh Pirates starter James McDonald, Oquendo came down the third base line to argue with home plate umpire Lance Barrett. He was immediately ejected from the game. Manager Mike Matheny came out to try to prevent further argument while Oquendo kicked dirt across the plate.

Oquendo developed "speed-feed" drills for the infielders. Besides lobbing the standard ground balls, Oquendo had third basemen Matt Carpenter and catching prospect Carson Kelly standing in foul territory about three paces away, bowling baseballs at a rapid pace until they grew tired and increased their endurance and improved footwork and positioning.

On March 27, 2016, he was placed on medical leave of absence due to his injured right knee. He rehabilitated in Florida for the next few months.

In 2017, Oquendo joined the Cardinals front office as a Special Assistant to the General Manager and as an instructor out of the Cardinals facility in Jupiter, Florida. He worked with minor league players in the Florida State and Gulf Coast Leagues, as well as players in extended spring training and medical rehab.

He rejoined the Cardinals at his third base coaching position on October 23, 2017, until being replaced by Pop Warner in 2019.

== Acting ==
=== The Sklar Brothers and the "Utility Man" ===
In 2004, a comical one-hour special aired on ESPN and was produced by MLB Productions about José Oquendo. It featured Randy and Jason Sklar of Cheap Seats going on a trip all the way to the National Baseball Hall of Fame in Cooperstown on a campaign to get José "The Utilityman" Oquendo inducted for his versatility to play any position on the baseball field. The special included the Sklars receiving Oquendo's blessing to lobby for his spot in Cooperstown, collecting signatures for the petition, and giving a lackluster presentation to the Hall of Fame's committee. At the end of the television special, a plaque bearing his name was placed on a utility closet in the Hall of Fame.

== See also ==
- List of Major League Baseball players from Puerto Rico
- List of Puerto Ricans
- List of St. Louis Cardinals coaches

Sporting positions
Preceded by Carney Lansford	St. Louis Cardinals bench coach 1999	Succeeded by Joe Pettini
Preceded by Rene Lachemann	St. Louis Cardinals third base coach 2000–2015	Succeeded by Chris Maloney
