= United Stats of America =

2012 television documentary

- Genre: Documentary
- Presented by: Randy and Jason Sklar
- Country of origin: United States
- Original language: English
- No. of seasons: 1
- No. of episodes: 6

Production
- Executive producers: Banks Tarver; Dirk Hoostra; John Vershoff; Ken Druckerman; Paul Cabana
- Production company: Left-Right Films

Original release
- Network: History Channel
- Release: May 8 – June 19, 2012

United Stats of America is a documentary that aired on the History Channel hosted by Randy and Jason Sklar. The show premiered on May 8, 2012.

== Synopsis ==
The show explores the stories behind the statistics that shaped the history of America.

== Episodes ==
No.	Title	Original release date	Prod. code
1	"Stayin' Alive"	May 8, 2012	101
2	"Moving Along"	May 15, 2012	102
3	"Size Matters"	May 22, 2012	103
4	"Time Flies"	June 5, 2012	104
5	"Money Talks"	June 12, 2012	105
6	"Livin' Large"	June 19, 2012	106

== Critical reception ==
The New York Times' Neil Genlinzer gave the show a positive review. Rob Owens from the Pittsburgh Post-Gazette said that the show wants to be a 30-minute show that was stretched into an hour. The A.V. Club reviewer Phil Dyess-Nugent gave the show a B− and said it was a fun show.
