= Missing Link (TV series) =

- Created by: Robert Abbott (director)
- Starring: Colin Cowherd
- Country of origin: United States
- No. of seasons: 1
- No. of episodes: 13

Production
- Running time: 30 minutes

Original release
- Network: ESPN Classic (2007)
- Release: March 7 – May 30, 2007

Missing Link was a retrospective sports program that aired on the American network ESPN Classic. It debuted on March 7, 2007, and aired every Wednesday night at 10 p.m. Eastern time and was hosted by the host of ESPN Radio's The Herd, Colin Cowherd.

Missing Link is best described as a version of Six Degrees of Kevin Bacon involving famous athletes, coaches, and other sports figures. Each end of the chain is seemingly the exact opposite of the other in some way, but are somehow connected. The length of each chain varies between five and seven names. In a television-worthy twist, one end is connected, then the other, with a middle link revealed only at the end, following a commercial break.

Missing Link was pre-empted on April 25 for a replay of the heavyweight boxing championship match between Lennox Lewis and Frank Bruno, but the show returned the following week, amidst a blog report that indicated that ESPN Classic would halt all original programs. It was then quietly dropped again two weeks later and did not return.

== Example ==
The first chain on the premiere episode was Lou Gehrig to Mike Tyson, as follows:

- One of Gehrig's teammates with the New York Yankees was Leo Durocher.
- Durocher was Willie Mays' first manager when Mays played for the New York Giants.
- Mays was once represented by attorney Howard Cosell.
- Cosell and Muhammad Ali conducted many memorable television interviews.
- Ali lost to Trevor Berbick in his final professional fight, in 1981.
- Berbick lost to Tyson in a 1986 title fight; this completes the chain.

== Highlight issues ==
On episodes on which this was applicable, the National Football League was represented by still photography, while other sports were represented by videotape. There has been no official information explaining the omission, but NFL Network debuted NFL Top 10, a new Wednesday-night countdown-style documentary series, several weeks after this show's first episode, so the network may have demanded exclusivity. The omission is similar to the snub the league gave to ESPN25 in 2004 in the aftermath of the Playmakers series. Similarly, despite the recent return of NASCAR to ESPN, only pre-2001 footage of Dale Earnhardt Jr. was shown on the episode on which he was linked to Carl Lewis. 2001 was the year NASCAR began to centralize its TV contracts.

== Episodes ==
Below is the list of episodes from season one of Missing Link.

=== Season One ===
1. March 7, 2007 – Iron Horse Lou Gehrig to Iron Mike Tyson, Joe Paterno to Anna Kournikova and Alex Rodriguez to Chi Chi Rodriguez.
2. March 14, 2007 – Cy Young to Vince Young, Bobby Jones to Bobby Knight and Jake LaMotta to Dennis Rodman.
3. March 21, 2007 – Ty Cobb to Tiger Woods, Dick Butkus to Dick Button and Muhammad Ali to Wayne Gretzky.
4. March 28, 2007 – George Herman Ruth to George Foreman, Ricky Bones to Dale Earnhardt Jr. and Maurice Richard to Roger Clemens.
5. April 4, 2007 – Oscar Robertson to Randy Johnson, Jim Thorpe to Deion Sanders and Minnesota Fats to Joe Montana.
6. April 11, 2007 – Terrell Owens to Jesse Owens, Richard Petty to LeBron James and Jersey Joe Walcott to Broadway Joe Namath.
7. April 18, 2007 – Eddie Gaedel to Gheorghe Mureșan, Kobe Bryant to Bear Bryant, The Four Horseman to The Fab Five.
8. April 25, 2007 – Knute Rockne to John Rocker, Larry Bird to Tony Hawk, Don Larsen to Nadia Comăneci.
9. May 2, 2007 – Ted Williams to Venus Williams and Serena Williams, Johnny Unitas to John Daly, Joe Louis to Ray Lewis.
10. May 9, 2007 – Arnold Schwarzenegger to Dale Earnhardt, Pelé to O. J. Simpson, Phil Rizzuto to Jerome Bettis.
11. May 16, 2007 – Secretariat to Mickey Mantle, George Brett to Brett Favre, Andre Agassi to André the Giant.
12. May 23, 2007 – Lance Armstrong to Hank Aaron, Mario Lemieux to Mario Andretti, Bo Jackson to Joe Jackson.
13. May 30, 2007 – Billy Gonsalves to Randy Johnson, Cale Yarborough to Steve Spurrier, Vance Law to Red Grange.
