= ESPNU =

American college sports cable network

- Country: United States
- Broadcast area: Nationwide
- Headquarters: ESPN Plaza, 935 Middle Street, Bristol, Connecticut

Programming
- Language: English
- Picture format: 720p (HDTV); Downgraded to letterboxed 480i for SDTV feed

Ownership
- Owner: The Walt Disney Company (72%; via ABC Inc.); Hearst Communications (18%); National Football League (10%)
- Parent: ESPN
- Sister channels: ABC; ESPN; ESPN DTC; ESPN+; ESPN2; ESPNews; ESPN Deportes; ACC Network; SEC Network; NFL Network; NFL RedZone

History
- Launched: March 4, 2005; 21 years ago

Links
- Website: www.espn.com/college-sports/

Availability

Streaming media
- WatchESPN or ESPN app: espn.com/watch (U.S. cable subscribers only; requires login from pay television provider to access content)
- Sling TV: Sports Extra Package
- YouTube TV: base package
- Hulu + Live TV: base package
- DirecTV Stream: Max package

ESPNU is an American multinational digital cable and satellite sports television channel owned by ESPN, a joint venture between the Walt Disney Company (which owns a controlling 72% stake via indirect subsidiary ABC Inc.), Hearst Communications (which owns 18%) and the National Football League (which owns 10%). The channel is primarily dedicated to coverage of college athletics and is also used as an additional outlet for general ESPN programming. ESPNU is based alongside its sister networks at ESPN's headquarters in Bristol, Connecticut.

As of November 2023, ESPNU is available to approximately 36,000,000 pay television households in the United States, down from its 2014 peak of 75,000,000 households.

== History ==
The network was launched on March 4, 2005, with its first broadcast originating from the site of Gallagher-Iba Arena on the Oklahoma State University campus in Stillwater, Oklahoma. The network's first live event was a semifinal game of the Ohio Valley Conference men's basketball tournament between Southeast Missouri State University and Eastern Kentucky University. The network was launched as a response to rival College Sports Television (CSTV) (now CBS Sports Network). ESPN was also being investigated by the U.S. Justice Department on allegations of "warehousing" collegiate sporting events from certain conferences, or signing a deal with a conference for all their games, but only televising a small number and not allowing the conference to make other arrangements for television broadcasts.

ESPN and XOS Technologies entered into a partnership for college athletics websites to compete directly with CSTV's growing internet presence. On August 28, 2006, ESPNU launched a new SportsCenter spin-off focusing entirely on college sports. The program, SportsCenterU, was originally scheduled to be broadcast from ESPN's headquarters in Bristol, Connecticut. However, ESPN instead chose to originate the show from Charlotte. Mike Hall was the program's lead anchor until August 2007, when he left for the new Big Ten Network. He was replaced by Mike Gleason and Lowell Galindo. The two are joined on-set by color commentators that vary depending on the sports season.

The same day as SportsCenterU's debut, ESPNU launched the website ESPNU.com. The site included live-streaming of college sports events, a multimedia player dedicated to college sports, podcasts and ESPN Motion clips of studio programming from the ESPNU television network.

ESPNU expanded its live programming to water polo by broadcasting its first-ever water polo match between the women's teams of Princeton University and Bucknell University on March 28, 2009, from DeNunzio Pool in Princeton, New Jersey.

In addition to its collegiate sports coverage, ESPNU has simulcast ESPN Radio's midday program over its airwaves since 2008, with the exception of a brief period between 2011 and 2012. The program airing for the majority of that time was The Herd with Colin Cowherd, which has since moved to Fox Sports Radio and is simulcast on Fox Sports 1. Following Cowherd's departure and several weeks of guest hosts taking over the timeslot, The Dan Le Batard Show with Stugotz became the permanent replacement for The Herd.

On April 26, 2017, as part of a larger series of company-wide cuts, it was announced that ESPNU's studio operations would be re-located from Charlotte to ESPN's main headquarters in Bristol, Connecticut. Less than 10 employees were laid off as part of the cuts. SEC Network and ESPN Events continue to operate out of Charlotte.

On August 8, 2017, ESPNU aired a marathon of lesser-known and unconventional non-college sports as "ESPN 8: The Ocho"—an homage to a fictitious eighth ESPN channel portrayed in the film DodgeBall: A True Underdog Story, which aired events that were "almost a sport". The stunt was reprised the following year on ESPN2.

On August 31, 2017, as part of an extension of ESPN's agreements with the service, SiriusXM's channel College Sports Nation was relaunched as ESPNU Radio. The channel carries audio simulcasts of ESPN college sports studio programming, as well as other programs and event coverage. The co-branding agreement ended on February 4, 2023.

== Carriage ==
On May 19, 2009, ESPN announced it had reached a carriage agreement with Comcast, which allows the cable provider to carry ESPNU on a widely distributed digital cable tier, instead of a less popular sports tier. ESPNU was added to most Comcast systems in time for the start of the 2009–10 college football season. This ended several years of negotiations and somewhat of a feud between Comcast and ESPN over carriage of ESPNU.

On that same date, ESPNU reached a new carriage agreement with DirecTV, which moved the channel from the satellite provider's add-on "Sports Pack" to its basic "Choice" package on July 1, 2009, swapping channels and packages with ESPN Classic. Cablevision added ESPNU to its systems on March 23, 2010.

ESPNU is carried on PlayStation Vue, and Sling TV.

Outside the United States, ESPNU became available in Mexico in 2017.

=== Dish Network lawsuit ===
On August 4, 2009 Dish Network sued ESPN for $1 million in a federal lawsuit, alleging that ESPN breached its contract by not extending the same carriage terms that the programmer provided to Comcast and DirecTV for ESPNU and ESPN Classic. The lawsuit claims ESPN violated the "Most Favored Nations" clause.

The next day, ESPN announced it would fight the lawsuit and said in a press release: "We have repeatedly advised Dish that we are in full compliance with our agreement and have offered them a distribution opportunity with respect to ESPNU and ESPN Classic consistent with the rest of the industry. We will not renegotiate settled contracts and will vigorously defend this legal action, the apparent sole purpose of which is to get a better deal."

Dish Network moved the channel from its "Classic Gold 250" package to its "Classic Bronze 100" package on September 30, 2009. However, it claimed that the move had nothing to do with the lawsuit.

== Coverage rights ==
ESPNU has rights to sporting events from the following collegiate athletic conferences:

- American Athletic Conference
- Atlantic Coast Conference (ACC)
- Big 12 Conference
- Big Ten Conference
- Conference USA
- Ivy League
- Mid-American Conference (MAC)
- Mid-Eastern Athletic Conference (MEAC)
- Missouri Valley Conference
- Missouri Valley Football Conference
- Pac-12 Conference
- Southeastern Conference (SEC)
- Southwestern Athletic Conference (SWAC)
- Sun Belt Conference
- Western Athletic Conference (WAC)
- West Coast Conference (WCC)

== List of programs broadcast by ESPNU ==
=== Current ===
==== Studio ====
- ESPNU Bracketology (2006–present)
- ESPNU Coaches Spotlight (2006–present)
- Give 'N Go (2007–present)
- Inside the Big East (2006–present)
- ESPNU Inside the Polls (2005–present)
- ESPNU Recruiting Insider (2006–present)
- SportsCenterU (2006–present)
- College Football Live
- Unsportsmanlike with Evan, Canty and Michelle (2023–present) (simulcast of ESPN Radio morning show hosted by Evan Cohen, Chris Canty and Michelle Smallmon)

=== Live sports programs ===
- ESPNU College Baseball (2005–present) Regular Season & select NCAA Tournament games LIVE
- ESPNU College Basketball (2005–present)
- ESPNU College Football (2005–present)
- ESPNU College Hockey (2005–present) Coverage of the Men's DI NCAA tournament regionals and the Women's National Collegiate Frozen Four (since 2021); select regular season games from the Big Ten (since 2013) and Hockey East (beginning 2022)
- ESPNU College Lacrosse (2005–present) Includes D1 Men's Tournament until Semis when it moves to ESPN 2.
- ESPNU College Soccer (2005–present) NCAA D1 Men's Semifinals Finals & Women's Semifinals & Finals as well as select men's & women's regular season games
- ESPNU College Softball (2005–present) Regular Season & select NCAA Tournament games LIVE
- ESPNU College Volleyball (2005–present) Women's games as well as Beach Volleyball Tournament Day 1
- ESPN Megacast (2006–2007 as ESPN Full Circle, 2015–present)
- High School Showcase (2005–present)
- NHL on ESPN (2022–present) – Playoff broadcasts
- NBA on ESPN (2015–2017?) – Playoff broadcasts
- NBA G League (2015–present) Mainly playoff games or G League showcase (since no fans are allowed to watch live at the stadium)
- International Champions Cup (2018–present) When there is more than one game on or an early morning game in United States Local Time
- United Soccer League (2018–present) a secondary network for the game of the week when ESPN2 or ESPNews has a live event at the games start
- FIL World Lacrosse Championships (2018–present)
- ESPN Radio TV Broadcasts – Only when ESPNews has a planned live sports "game" event cuts off there coverage of the broadcast will it be on ESPNU.
- Formula One (2018–present) Live Telecast of Sky Sports F1 Grand Prix Practice 2 Coverage Only as ESPN 2 airs Practice 1 & Qualifying Sessions with ESPNews & Major Races On ESPN/ABC
- Pan American Games (2011, 2015 & 2019) English coverage of the games when ESPN 2 or ESPN has other sports coverage. Just a loop around of the main events/matches going on at that moment, however every match is in Spanish only on ESPN 3
- Summer of Next (2013–present) Showcases the best High School Athletes in the semi-finals & championship matches of some of the best tournaments in High School Lacrosse, Basketball, Softball, & Baseball. It ends with the best High School Football teams, players & games in the first weekend of the High School Football season with a three day event on the ESPN Networks.
- The Basketball Tournament Quarterfinal matches that ESPN or ESPN 2 can not show due to other sports.
- Microsoft Excel Collegiate Challenge Live annual competition with more than 2,800 registered students from 93 countries and 596 universities and colleges.

=== Original series ===
- Faces of Sports (2005–present)
- Honor Roll (2005–present)
- The Season: Ole Miss Football (2018–present)

=== Former ===
- Summer House (2006–2007)
- The U (2005–2006)
- UNITE (2012–2013)

== Personalities ==
=== Current ===
==== Announcers, reporters and hosts ====
- Dave Armstrong: (play-by-play, 2005–present) ESPNU College Football
- Rece Davis: (host, 2005–present) Honor Roll
- Mike Gleason: (host and play-by-play, 2005–present) SportsCenterU and ESPNU College Football Primetime
- Clay Matvick: (host, reporter and play-by-play, 2006–present) ESPNU College Football and ESPNU College Basketball
- Chris Spielman: (host, 2006–present) Summer House
- Lisa Salters: (reporter, 2008–present) ESPNU reporter
- Ian Darke: (play-by-play, 2010–present) ESPNU play-by-play
- Joe Davis: (play-by-play, 2012–present) ESPNU play-by-play
- Jaymee Sire: (reporter, 2013–present) ESPNU reporter
- Mark Jones: (host, 2006–present) ESPNU host
- Anish Shroff: (host, 2005–present) ESPNU host SportsCenterU
- Carter Blackburn: (reporter, 2006–present) ESPNU reporter
- Mike Crispino: (reporter, 2005–present) ESPNU reporter
- Craig Custance: (reporter, 2012–present) ESPNU reporter
- Bob Wischusen: (play-by-play, 2006–present) ESPNU play-by-play

==== College hockey ====
- Colby Cohen: (analyst, 2016–present) ESPNU College Hockey

==== College football ====
- Lee Corso: (analyst, 2003–present) ESPNU College Football
- Mike Tomczak: (analyst, 2005–present) ESPNU College Football
- Jay Walker: (analyst, 2005–present) ESPNU College Football Primetime
- Todd McShay: (analyst, 2005–present) ESPNU Inside the Polls
- Charles Arbuckle: (analyst, 2005–present) ESPNU College Football Primetime
- David Diaz-Infante: (analyst, 2005–present) ESPNU College Football Primetime
- Chris Martin: (analyst, 2006–present) ESPNU College Football Primetime
- Brian Kinchen: (analyst, 2006) ESPNU College Football
- Mike Adamle: (play-by-play, 2005–present) ESPNU College Football Primetime
- Desmond Howard: (analyst, 2005–present) ESPNU College Football

==== College baseball ====
- Mark Mulder: (analyst, 2011–present) ESPNU College Baseball
- Tom Luginbill: (analyst, 2006–present) SportsCenterU and ESPNU Recruiting Insider and ESPNU College Baseball
- John Kruk: (analyst, 2003–present) ESPNU College Baseball
- Doug Glanville: (analyst, 2011–present) ESPNU College Baseball

==== College basketball ====
- Jay Bilas: (analyst, 2003–present) ESPNU College Basketball
- Dick Vitale: (analyst, 1985–present) ESPNU College Basketball
- Digger Phelps: (analyst, 2000–present) ESPNU College Basketball
- Jalen Rose: (analyst, 2007–present) ESPNU College Basketball
- Andy Katz: (analyst, 2005–present) ESPNU College Basketball
- Tim Legler: (analyst, 2003–present) ESPNU College Basketball
- Jon Barry: (analyst, 2003–present) ESPNU College Basketball
- Mark Adams: (analyst, 2003–present) ESPNU College Basketball
- Tim Welsh: (analyst, 2003–present) ESPNU College Basketball
- Adrian Branch: (analyst, 2006–present) ESPNU College Basketball

=== Former ===
- Colin Cowherd: (host, 2008–2015) ESPNU Host
- Mike Gottfried: (analyst, 2005–) ESPNU Inside the Polls and ESPNU College Basketball
- Mike Hall: (host, 2005–2007) SportsCenterU, ESPNU Recruiting Insider, ESPNU Inside the Polls and ESPNU Coaches Spotlight
- Wayne Larrivee: (play-by-play, 2005) ESPNU College Football
- Barry Melrose: (analyst, 1993–2023) ESPNU College Hockey
- Kelly Stouffer: (analyst, 2005) ESPNU College Football Primetime
- Howie Schwab: (reporter, 2005–2013) ESPNU Reporter
- Randy Walker: (analyst, 2005) ESPNU College Football

== See also ==
- College football on television
- Men's college basketball on television
