= Super Bikes! =

- Super Bikes! logo
- Country of origin: United States
- Original language: English
- No. of seasons: 4
- No. of episodes: 48

Original release
- Network: Speed Channel
- Release: June 2006 – present

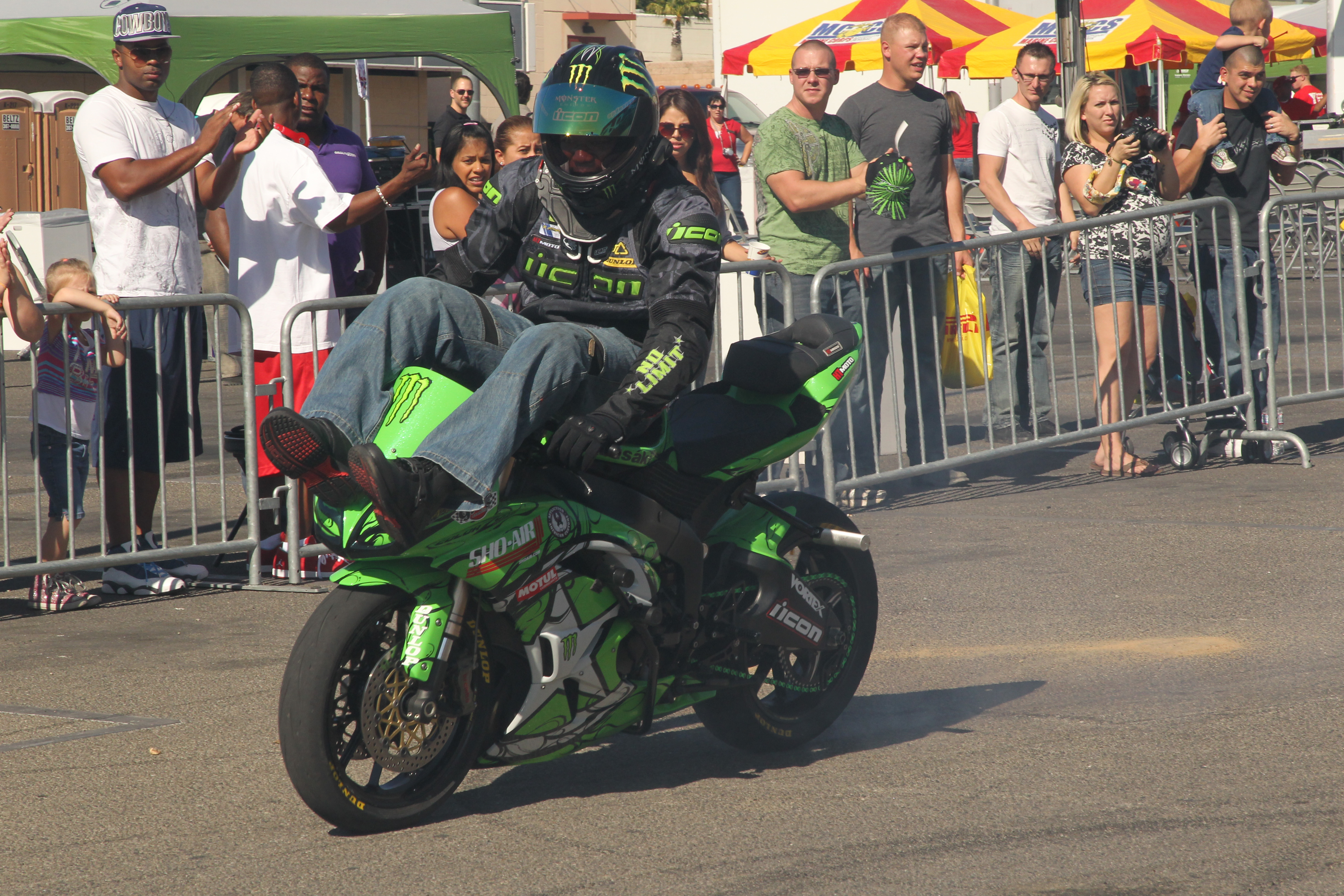
Britton demonstrating stunt riding

Super Bikes! is a television show that first aired on Speed Channel in 2006. It follows popular American stunt rider Jason Britton as he goes around the country to check out the sport bike scene. The show mostly showcases stunt riding and stunting competitions, but it also delves into other aspects of the sport bike culture and motor sports in general.

== Episode list ==
=== Season 2 ===
Episode Number	Episode Name	Synopsis
01	DC & Virginia	
02	Japan	
03	Black Bike Week	
04	Johnny Law	
05	French Treat	
06	Grudge Racing	
07	Bonneville	
08	The Bostroms	
09	West Coast Presidents Alliance	
10	Aprilia Stuntbike	
11	Trade Secrets	
12	Clutch Control	
13	Sturgis	

=== Season 3 ===
Episode Number	Episode Name	Synopsis
01	29 Palms / ZX-14	
02	Stunt Wars	
03	Ice Stunting / LRG	
04	Freestyle Ingenuity	
05	Jason's Life	
06	Jamaica	
07	Bike Week	
08	Oakland	
09	XDL World Finals	
10	Nice	
11	Stunt Show	
12	Grapecrusher	
13	Atlantic Beach	

=== Season 4 ===
Episode Number	Episode Name	Synopsis
01	Fourth of July Party	
02	Sturgis!	
03	Inaugural MotoGP	
04	Philly Love	
05	Fort Bragg	
06	Jason has Surgery	
07	Convention Hopping	
08	Road to Recovery	
09	The Early Years	
