= ESPN Classic Remembers =

Television series

ESPN Classic Remembers is a television program on ESPN Classic that chronicles historic games and events, personalities and other sports milestones. The show debuted on September 11, 2006 and is hosted by ESPN SportsCenter personality Chris McKendry. It is primarily a thirty-minute program followed by a rerun of the sporting event it is chronicling.

The first episode of ESPN Classic Remembers aired on the fifth anniversary of the 9/11 attacks and its impact on the sports world. It was followed by a replay of the only edition of SportsCenter to air that night announcing the cancellation of all sporting events for at least a week. That SportsCenter was hosted by Bob Ley and Trey Wingo, who also gave commentary about that night.

Often, the series is used in retrospect following the death of a notable sports figure or a significant anniversary of a major event that changed the face of sports. In 2007, it was used on the 25th anniversary of the Ray Mancini vs. Kim Duk-koo fight in 1982 that resulted in Kim's death, and included the airing of the Korean film Champion.

== Season one ==
The first season began airing in September 2006. Show topics discussed include ESPN Classic Remembers:

- 9/11 (September 11, 2006)
- The First November: World Series 2001 (September 11, 2006)
- Hearns vs. Leanard Fight (September 16, 2006)
- Buckner and the '86 World Series (October 25, 2006)
- Bo Schembechler (November 18, 2006)

== Season two ==
- The Tragedy Of The Munich Games (September 5, 2007)
