= The Top 5 Reasons You Can't Blame... =

US television program

The Top 5 Reasons You Can't Blame... is a sports series that debuted in 2005 and aired on ESPN2 and ESPN Classic. The show ran from April 2005 to April 2007. The show was canceled when ESPN Classic phased out the production of original programs. Some episodes were planned but never completed.

== Format ==
Hosted by Brian Kenny, the series examines controversial figures and events in the history of sports that featured figure(s) involved in the event later being labeled as a scapegoat. In each episode, the show defends the accused by presenting evidence to separate fact from fiction, and then explaining why the accused cannot be held accountable from experts and witnesses.

Several reasons that did not make the list (called "The Best of the Rest") are discussed first, followed by the actual top five reasons.

The first episode aired in April 2005 and examined The Top 5 Reasons You Can't Blame Steve Bartman for the Cubs' 2003 playoff collapse. Bartman was excoriated by Cubs fans as the reason for the Cubs' 8th inning collapse against the Florida Marlins in the sixth game of the 2003 National League Championship Series. He unwittingly became the focus of the derision of long-suffering Cubs fans and the butt of many jokes.

== Schedule history ==
When the show moved to ESPN Classic late in 2005, the show debuted at 9 p.m. Eastern time. The following year, it was moved back to 10 p.m. In both cases, new episodes debuted on Tuesday and were repeated on Thursday. In late 2006, The Top 5 Reasons... was pulled back to Thursdays only, with the RM Classic Car Auction shown on Tuesdays. Reruns continue to air from time to time; for example, the episode in which Barry Bonds is exonerated aired on August 8, 2007, one day after his 756th career Major League Baseball home run established the new record.

== Seasonal overview ==
=== Season 1 ===
After the first episode, the topics in the 1st season covered The Top 5 Reasons You Can't Blame...

- Art Modell for moving the Browns to Baltimore.
- Kobe Bryant for the breakup of the Lakers.
- John McEnroe for his repeated outbursts in tennis matches.
- Jerry Krause for the breakup of the Bulls.
- The Chicago White Sox for throwing the 1919 World Series (see Black Sox Scandal).
- Wilt Chamberlain for losing to Bill Russell in seven of their eight playoff matchups.
- The Portland Trail Blazers for drafting Sam Bowie over Michael Jordan.
- The U.S. golf team for its 1999 Ryder Cup celebration.
- Bill Buckner for the Red Sox losing the 1986 World Series.
- Umpire Don Denkinger for the Cardinals losing the 1985 World Series.
- Harry Frazee for selling Babe Ruth to the Yankees.
- The Atlanta Falcons for trading Brett Favre.
- Major League Baseball for continuing the lifetime ban of Pete Rose and thus making him ineligible for the Hall of Fame.
- Mike Tyson for losing to Buster Douglas.

=== Season 2 ===
In September 2005, a new line-up of episodes was created. Season 2 examined The Top 5 Reasons You Can't Blame...:

- Mitch Williams for the Phillies losing the 1993 World Series.
- Ralph Branca for the Dodgers losing the 1951 pennant (see "The Shot Heard 'Round the World").
- The Edmonton Oilers for trading Wayne Gretzky.
- The BCS for the lack of a playoff in Division I-A college football.
- Terrell Owens for his over-the-top celebrations.
- Earnest Byner for the Browns' 1987 playoff loss (see The Fumble).
- Dan Marino for never winning a Super Bowl.
- Scott Norwood for the Buffalo Bills losing Super Bowl XXV. (See Wide Right.)
- Sports Illustrated magazine for publishing a Swimsuit Issue.
- Bob Knight for his repeated outbursts.
- Fred Brown for Georgetown's loss to North Carolina in the 1982 NCAA Men's Division I Basketball Championship NCAA Final.
- Georgetown for losing to Villanova in the 1985 NCAA Men's Division I Basketball Championship NCAA Final.
- Chris Webber for Michigan's loss to North Carolina in the 1993 NCAA Men's Division I Basketball Championship NCAA Final.
- George Steinbrenner for the economic divide in Major League Baseball. (The Kansas City Royals would win the 2015 World Series 10 years after the episode aired.)
- Jose Canseco for revealing the extent of steroid use in baseball.

=== Season 3 ===
Season 3 examined The Top 5 Reasons You Can't Blame...

- Michael Jordan for trying to play baseball.
- Charles Barkley for saying, "I am not a role model."
- Walter O'Malley for moving the Dodgers from Brooklyn to Los Angeles.
- Greg Norman for not winning more majors.
- Len Bias's death for the demise of the Boston Celtics. (This was often referred as the "Curse of Len Bias" in Boston, at least until the Celtics won the 2008 NBA title.)
- Dennis Rodman for being a bad boy.
- Marvin Hagler for losing to Sugar Ray Leonard in 1987.
- Anna Kournikova for never winning a singles tennis title.
- The NCAA for not paying athletes.
- George Foreman for losing to Muhammad Ali. (See "Rumble in the Jungle.")
- Barry Bonds for being Barry Bonds. (The Pittsburgh Pirates would end its string of 20 consecutive losing seasons in 2013.)
- Steroids for the home run explosion.
- The Minnesota Vikings for trading for Herschel Walker.
- Peyton Manning for never winning the Big One. (He did win at the end of the 2006 NFL season and Super Bowl 50 in the 2015 season, but both were after this episode aired.)
- Pete Carroll for USC losing to Texas in the 2006 Rose Bowl.
- Jerry Jones for the demise of the Cowboys.
- Hardcore NASCAR fans for hating Jeff Gordon.
- Grady Little for the Red Sox losing the 2003 ALCS.
- The New York Yankees for losing a 3–0 lead to the Boston Red Sox in the 2004 ALCS.
- Bobby Cox for the repeated postseason losses of the Atlanta Braves.
- Bode Miller for not living up to the hype.
- Matt Leinart for returning for his senior season at USC.

=== Season 4 ===
The following programs aired in Season 4:

- The Referees for Miami losing the 2003 Fiesta Bowl.
- The Buffalo Bills for losing four consecutive Super Bowls.
- John Carlos and Tommie Smith for the Black Power Salute.
- Phi Slama Jama for not winning an NCAA Championship.
- UNLV for losing to Duke in the 1991 Final Four.
- The Red Sox for letting Roger Clemens go.
- John Daly for being golf's bad boy.
- Mike Tyson for being out of control.
- The American League for using a Designated Hitter.
- John Elway for refusing to play for the Baltimore Colts.
- The referees for the U.S. Basketball loss to USSR in 1972.
- Bucky Bleeping Dent for the Red Sox losing the 1978 AL East.
