= Cheap Seats (TV series) =

2004 American TV series

- Genre: Sports comedy
- Starring: Randy and Jason Sklar
- Country of origin: United States
- Original language: English
- No. of seasons: 4
- No. of episodes: 77

Production
- Running time: 30 minutes

Original release
- Network: ESPN Classic
- Release: February 4, 2004 – November 19, 2006

Cheap Seats without Ron Parker, or Cheap Seats: Without Ron Parker commonly shortened to Cheap Seats, is a television program broadcast on ESPN Classic and hosted by brothers Randy and Jason Sklar. The brothers appear as fictional ESPN tape librarians who amuse themselves by watching old, campy sports broadcasts and lampooning them. The series was produced by Mark Shapiro; Todd Pellegrino was the showrunner, with James Cohen and Joseph Maar also producing. Cheap Seats was originally an hour-long program, with eight one-hour episodes in the first season, all of which were edited to fit a 30-minute time slot.

A number of actors and comedians were featured in various pre recorded and in-studio comedy skits on the show, including Jim Gaffigan, H. Jon Benjamin, David Cross, Zach Galifianakis, Ed Helms, Eugene Mirman, Michael Ian Black, Nick Kroll, Kristen Schaal, Judah Friedlander, Nick Swardson, Mike Birbiglia, Paul Rudd, Doug Benson, Kathy Griffin, Carlos Alazraqui and Patton Oswalt.

== Regular segments ==
Cheap Seats debuted on February 4, 2004, with the opening of the episode showing "Ron Parker" (played by Michael Showalter), the show's browbeating original host, injured by a shelf full of tapes after it collapses on him, thus forcing the Sklars to fill in as hosts as they were #2 and #3 on the depth chart after him (ahead of #4 Ryan Leaf). This skit was part of the show's opening theme until the second season, which featured a new introduction while all references to Parker were removed (although in the theme song which opened episodes of Season 4, the lyrics include "going farther than Ron Parker").

In addition to the Sklars' regular commentary, Cheap Seats contained regular segments such as "Do You Care?" (in which the Sklars informed viewers of obscure facts related to the shows they were watching), and "The Cheapies", where awards in nonsensical categories were given out to in-episode personalities at the show's closing. Other regular segments included "Breakdown", where then-ESPN analyst Sean Salisbury would comedically break down an athlete's performance; and "What Got Cut", in which other humorous elements of an episode that were edited due to time constraints were glossed over by the Sklars. "Cheap Shot of the Week" showcased an athlete featured earlier in the show or in a prior episode at their worst. Original sketches parodying a topic relevant to a particular program were filmed by various comedians.

The set featured a wall-mounted poster that would appear on camera prior to commercial breaks, which read "Attention ESPN Staff: Do Not Lend Tapes to This Person" and contained a photograph of a then-relevant notorious celebrity or athlete, such as Vince McMahon or Barry Bonds. A photo of the Sklars themselves was seen in the series finale.

=== Live-audience era ===
Cheap Seats briefly included a live studio audience and virtual laugh track during the second season, starting with an episode on the 1980 Major League Baseball All-Star Game. Only six shows were produced with this format, and the audience was gone by the premiere of the third season on September 19, 2005. The episodes with the audience were edited to minimize their presence in future reruns.

=== On the Road ===
Two episodes were taped in locations other than New York or Los Angeles. In October 2005, ESPN Classic aired "Cheap Seats on the Road" from the Sklar brothers' hometown of St. Louis, Missouri, where the second Busch Stadium was being torn down because part of it was on the same land on which Busch Stadium III was being constructed. On the episode, the Sklars try to convince city officials to cancel the stadium's demolition by combining the two into a bizarre superstructure.

During Season 3, Cheap Seats went to Hillsborough, New Jersey, after a contestant won a contest for the Sklars to film an episode in their home. The episode was titled Cheap Seats on the Road: A Fan's Couch.

=== Utilityman: The Quest for Cooperstown ===
This particular episode, which is not officially a part of the Cheap Seats canon, is a 2004 ESPN special (produced by MLB Productions). It features the Sklars going on a trip to St. Louis and then to Cooperstown. The Sklars went all the way to the National Baseball Hall of Fame on a campaign to get beloved 1980s and 1990s St. Louis Cardinals player José "The Utilityman" Oquendo inducted for his versatility to play almost any position on the baseball field. (In 1988, Oquendo became the first National League player since 1918 to have played all nine positions in one season.)

== Source material ==
Most of the broadcasts are from ESPN's archives. Among them:

- Wide World of Sports broadcasts
- Professional wrestling
- Scripps National Spelling Bee
- World Series of Poker final tables
- Steve Garvey celebrity sporting events

Cheap Seats was shot in New York City (with segments filmed in Los Angeles) and had made use of local comedians as guest stars in its sketches. Most of the bit parts were played by stand-up comics whom Jason and Randy met during their years on the road as standup comedians themselves. The "Creative Breaking/K-1 Fighting" episode guest-starred the cast of Mystery Science Theater 3000, in their theatrical silhouette form, cracking on sketches the Sklars performed.

== Series finale ==
A special titled This is Inside Cheap Seats that aired on April 17, 2006, though most of the content therein was fictional. The fourth and final season premiered on June 5, 2006.

The series finale aired on November 19, and included racquetball, amateur bowling, curling, model airplane racing, and ping-pong. The episode's main focus was on the Sklars (fictitiously) getting a job on ESPN's SportsCenter. However, it turned out they weren't hired to be anchors, but as errand boys to do the anchors' bidding, causing the brothers to consider going back to the show, which was currently being hosted by then New York Yankees outfielder Johnny Damon (a fan of the show) and a recurring character called the "Score Settler." Before the last episode, ESPN Classic presented 12 previous episodes in a six-hour "finale-a-thon."

Cheap Seats reruns no longer air, and ESPN Classic has since shut down. Selected episodes from the first season were at one time, but are no longer, available for purchase through the iTunes Store.
