= Bowhunter TV =

- Genre: Sports
- Starring: Mike Carney, Curt Wells, Randy Ulmer
- Country of origin: United States

Production
- Executive producer: Jeff Waring
- Running time: 22 Minutes

Original release
- Network: Outdoor Channel Sportsman Channel
- Release: June 27, 2005 – present

Bowhunter TV is a television series about the sport of bowhunting which debuted on the Outdoor Channel in 2005. It is made in conjunction with Bowhunter Magazine and now airs on the Sportsman Channel. The show is produced by the Outdoor Sportsman Group and owned by Kroenke Sports & Entertainment.

== Contributors ==
Bowhunter TV has many contributors, mostly employees of the magazine but sometimes also sponsor guests or friends of the writers.

Hosts include Mike Carney and Curt Wells.

Regular contributors:

- Dwight Schuh
- Brian Fortenbaugh
- Danny Farris
- Terry Lauber
- Larry D. Jones
- Jeff Millar
- Derek Mleynek
- Tony Peterson
- Randy Ulmer
- Jeff Waring
- CJ Winand
- Laden Force
