= A Dangerous Game =

A Dangerous Game may refer to:

- A Dangerous Game (novel), a 1956 novel by Swiss writer Friedrich Dürrenmatt
- A Dangerous Game (1922 film), an American silent drama film
- A Dangerous Game (1924 film), a German silent adventure film
- A Dangerous Game (1941 film), an American mystery film
- A Dangerous Game (2014 film), a documentary film
- "A Dangerous Game" (Pretty Little Liars), an episode of Pretty Little Liars

== See also ==
- Dangerous Game (disambiguation)
