= The Way It Was (TV series) =

- Created by: Herb Schmertz
- Directed by: Glenn Swanson; Jerry Hughes
- Presented by: Curt Gowdy
- Country of origin: United States
- No. of seasons: 5

Production
- Producers: Gerry Gross; Dick Enberg
- Running time: 30 Minutes
- Production companies: Gerry Gross Productions; Mobil Oil Corporation

Original release
- Network: PBS
- Release: 1974 – 1978

The Way It Was is a PBS television series featuring athletes reminiscing about a particular sporting event from the past that aired from 1974 to 1978. Hosted by Curt Gowdy, the bulk of the 30-minute broadcast was dedicated to rebroadcasting the game, uninterrupted but in edited form, with a short 5-minute discussion segment at the end of the show. The show is also notable for its computer-animated intro with the song "Happy Days Are Here Again".

Gerry Gross, who created Sports Challenge, produced the show in association with KCET in Los Angeles. PBS aired the show from October 3, 1974 to 1978. Mobil Corporation provided major funding for the series, and has also released a 1975 book on the series, as a tie-in with the show's first season.

In 1976, the show was nominated for an Emmy Award in the category of "Outstanding Edited Sports Series."

Reruns later aired on ESPN Classic, occasionally under banner titles such as NFL's Greatest Games or Classic World Series Film.
