= SummerBall =

- Also known as: SummerBall NY
- Presented by: Bobbito Garcia and Boobie Smooth
- Starring: Michael Bivins; EBC at Rucker Park
- Country of origin: United States
- No. of episodes: 44

Production
- Running time: 30 minutes

Original release
- Network: MSG Network
- Release: June 26, 2006 – present

Summerball NY is the Thursday night primetime basketball television program and the primary broadcast of the elite summer basketball leagues in New York City. In the past, it has featured Hoops In The Sun at Orchard Beach and Dyckman Basketball League in Washington Heights, . Sumerball is produced by Hard 2 Guard productions and edited by Phat Sumo media.

There has been some confusion that Summerball was changed to The EBC Show that premiered this summer in the absence of Summerball however there is not true. Summerball took a year off to rebuild its content and will re-air on MSG in the summer of 2010.

Bobbito Garcia and Boobie Smooth are the host of the show not Michael Bivins.
