= Summer House (2006 TV series) =

US television program

- Starring: Chris Spielman
- Country of origin: United States
- No. of seasons: 1
- No. of episodes: 8

Production
- Running time: 30 minutes

Original release
- Network: ESPNU
- Release: July 25 – September 12, 2006

Summer House is a reality series that aired on ESPNU and was hosted by Chris Spielman. The show debuted on July 25, 2006, ran for eight episodes, and ended on September 12, 2006.

== Premise ==
The show features six of the nation’s top college football incoming freshmen living together in a house in Chicago for one week. Summer House provides viewers with an inside look at future college football stars. The players compete against each other to be named “The King of the House.” Competitors earn points for each challenge they participate in, culminating in the final day when the “King” is crowned. Throughout the week, the players interact with each other and sports celebrities, learning what it takes to succeed both on and off the field.

== Production ==
The ESPN production was produced by Intersport, a Chicago-based production company, with head producers Michael Kolodny and Jim Gorman planning each day. ESPN also had producers Adam Briles and Paul Gordon assist in its productions.

=== Special Guests ===
Special guests in the first season included:

- Jennie Finch (USA Olympic gold medalist)
- Trent Green and Larry Johnson (Kansas City Chiefs)
- Todd Heap and Derrick Mason (Baltimore Ravens)
- Greg Lewis (Philadelphia Eagles)
- Gale Sayers (Chicago Bears Hall of Famer)
- Ken Williams (Chicago White Sox GM)
- Mike Hall (ESPNU’s signature anchor)
- Bob Davie (ESPN college football analyst)

=== Contestants ===
The contestants included:

- Terrence Austin (four-star wide receiver, UCLA)
- Jarred Fayson (four-star wide receiver/quarterback, Florida)
- Cart Kelly (two-star wide receiver/cornerback, Princeton)
- London Crawford (three-star wide receiver, Arkansas)
- Cody Hawkins (three-star quarterback, Colorado)
- Taylor Potts (three-star quarterback, Texas Tech)

== Sponsors ==
The show’s main sponsors were Under Armour, Direct TV, and Dick’s Sporting Goods.
