= NASCAR Outdoors =

- Genre: Sports
- Country of origin: United States

Original release
- Network: Outdoor Life Network (2004-2006); Versus (2006-2011); Outdoor Channel (2011-present)
- Release: April 4 – September 10, 2004

NASCAR Outdoors is an outdoors television series sponsored by the National Association of Stock Car Racing (NASCAR) first broadcast on the Outdoor Life Network on April 4, 2004. Outdoor Channel began to broadcast the series in 2011, under the title Realtree's NASCAR Outdoors.
