= ESPN Classic =

American television channel telecasting vintage sporting events (1995–2021)

- Country: United States
- Broadcast area: Nationwide
- Headquarters: Bristol, Connecticut

Programming
- Language: English
- Picture format: 480i (SDTV)

Ownership
- Owner: ESPN Inc.: (The Walt Disney Company (80%); Hearst Communications (20%))

History
- Launched: May 6, 1995; 31 years ago
- Closed: December 31, 2021; 4 years ago
- Former names: Classic Sports Network (1995–1997)

ESPN Classic was an American multinational pay television network owned by ESPN Inc., a joint venture between The Walt Disney Company (with a controlled 80% stake) and Hearst Communications (which held the remaining 20%).

The channel was originally launched as the Classic Sports Network in 1995, and was acquired by ESPN in 1997. The network originally focused on carrying classic sporting events, other programs and documentaries, and live specials (such as the Baseball Hall of Fame induction ceremony) focusing on sports history.

By the 2010s, due to the increasing number of sport-, league-, and college conference-specific networks that had assumed rights to the archival and live content that was historically aired by ESPN Classic, a larger amount of programming was devoted to archive content whose rights were owned by ESPN outright, reruns of recent events from ESPN's networks, as well as ESPN original documentaries and overflow coverage of events from other ESPN networks.

In 2014, ESPN began to phase out ESPN Classic as a linear service, and transition it to a branded video on-demand offering. A number of major providers, such as AT&T, Altice USA (now Optimum Communications), Comcast, and Verizon Fios dropped ESPN Classic in the years that followed. Due to this change in format, ESPNews and ESPN's digital platforms have supplanted its role as an overflow service. In 2021, media reports indicated that the channel would close at the end of the year, and it did so in the late hours of December 31, 2021.

== History ==
The channel was launched on May 6, 1995, as the Classic Sports Network. The Post-Newsweek Cable (now Sparklight) system in Ada, Oklahoma, with 6,500 subscribers at the time of CSN's launch, was the first cable provider to carry the network. CSN was founded by Brian Bedol and Stephen Greenberg, both of whom went on to launch College Sports Television (now CBS Sports Network), with partial funding from Allen & Company. In 1997, ESPN, Inc. purchased Classic Sports Network for $175 million, and relaunched it as ESPN Classic the following year. Throughout its history, dating back to its existence as Classic Sports Network, the channel's logo has incorporated a stylized silhouette intending to resemble a boxer.

In February 2008, The Wall Street Journal reported that NFL Network chief executive Steve Bornstein had been in "high-level discussions" with NFL and Disney executives including CEO Robert Iger and NFL Commissioner Roger Goodell. An analyst quoted in the report suggested a merger of NFL Network with ESPN Classic due to the latter's wide distribution on expanded basic cable tiers.

On August 4, 2009, Dish Network filed a federal lawsuit against ESPN for $1 million, alleging that the network breached its contract by not extending the same contractual term of carriage that ESPN provided to Comcast and DirecTV for ESPNU and ESPN Classic. The lawsuit claimed that ESPN violated the "Most Favored Nations" clause. The following day, representatives for ESPN announced in a press release that the company would fight the lawsuit, stating: "We have repeatedly advised Dish that we are in full compliance with our agreement and have offered them a distribution opportunity with respect to ESPNU and ESPN Classic consistent with the rest of the industry. We will not renegotiate settled contracts and will vigorously defend this legal action, the apparent sole purpose of which is to get a better deal."

=== Carriage ===
On October 1, 2014, ESPN Classic began a gradual transition into a video on demand-only service, with Dish Network becoming the first to discontinue carriage of the linear channel and carry it as a VOD service on that date. Other providers followed suit in the years that followed. In December 2017, cable companies Comcast Xfinity and Optimum dropped the ESPN Classic linear channel from their TV lineups. On February 4, 2019, Verizon FiOS removed the channel from the lineup. Spectrum, as part of their newest Disney agreement approved in August 2019, began dropping ESPN Classic from their systems on October 15, 2019. On November 4, 2019, Cox Communications removed it from their lineup. On November 30, 2019, DirecTV and AT&T U-verse removed the network from their lineup as the contract for carriage expired without renewal after resolving a dispute earlier in the year with The Walt Disney Company. Atlantic Broadband dropped ESPN Classic from all of its systems on September 1, 2021.

=== Closure ===
On November 4, 2021, John Ourand of Sports Business Journal reported that Disney had informed cable and satellite providers that ESPN Classic, including its associated on-demand service, would close at the end of 2021. The Hollywood Reporter later stated that an ESPN spokesperson confirmed that the network would close on December 31, 2021. Commentary on the channel's demise focused on its small distribution (now down to 2 million households, as compared to the flagship ESPN channel's 85 million homes), and the emergence of YouTube and other internet streaming options (including corporate sibling ESPN+) as compliments to the channel's mission; the emergence of league-specific networks (including sister channels ACC Network, Longhorn Network, and SEC Network, all of which are co-managed by ESPN Inc.) gave the company additional linear outlets for the content that served as ESPN Classic's main programming, rendering the channel redundant.

The network officially ended distribution at 5:59 a.m. Eastern on January 1, 2022, after a final airing of the Thrilla in Manila, though under Nielsen's definition of a broadcast day, it was considered to have ended on December 31, 2021.

The Canadian version of ESPN Classic, owned by the same Bell/ESPN Inc. consortium that owns the domestic sports multiplex TSN, outlasted the original channel by roughly a year and a half, as it ceased broadcasting on October 31, 2023.

== Programming ==
In 2008, as part of a cost-cutting move, ESPN Classic's schedule began to become largely composed of ESPN original programming, highlighting sports such as poker, bowling and boxing, with a decreased emphasis on rebroadcasts of classic major league sporting events (a practice which has, however, been adopted by sports networks associated with a league or individual teams, among other channels). By 2005, the channel had also frequently broadcast overflow programming from the main ESPN channels, and reruns of ESPN-produced telecasts of recent sporting events that the network has declared an "Instant Classic".

ESPN Classic was the only U.S.-based ESPN network (and one of two Disney-owned cable channels in the United States, alongside Freeform) that aired infomercials, which ran daily from 6:00 to 7:00 a.m. Eastern Time. As of May 20, 2012, ESPN Classic was the last remaining ESPN-branded network and the only cable channel owned by Disney that does not operate a high definition simulcast feed, due to the majority of its content being vintage footage produced before the existence of high-definition television; outside of specific programming available in widescreen, the channel aired all programming in the 4:3 aspect ratio, and it used the safe area-restricted "BottomLine" sports news ticker previously used by ESPN on ABC broadcasts on sister network ABC until August 2016 when it switched to a 16:9 presentation. It was also the only ESPN network that is not available on the network's WatchESPN app for mobile devices as a live feed, likely due to licensing restrictions for the archival content aired on the channel; the few live events it did carry were otherwise listed as provided by ESPN3 on WatchESPN. The network's VOD component was launched for existing subscribers using Apple TV and Roku devices through WatchESPN on April 28, 2016, likely under a modified license to allow content distribution via that platform.

Older sports programming from the 1990s and earlier has moved almost entirely to league-specific networks including the Big Ten Network, MLB Network, NBA TV, NHL Network, NFL Network, Tennis Channel, or various team-owned regional sports networks. Likewise, archival games from the Southeastern Conference and the University of Texas Longhorns have respectively moved to the ESPN-operated SEC Network and Longhorn Network.

By 2011, ESPN Classic drifted toward a mix of reruns of entertainment series in prime time, and movies (mostly ESPN Films productions and documentaries such as the 30 for 30 series) making up the majority of the channel's weekend schedule. The majority of "classic" sports events in ESPN Classic's program library as of its shutdown were college football and basketball games from the past decade which had not been claimed by conference networks, along with boxing, professional wrestling and bowling events whose copyrights were maintained solely by ESPN.

=== Broadcasting of live events ===
The first live event to be shown on ESPN Classic was the implosion of the Kingdome in Seattle, WA in March 2000. By 2005 however, ESPN Classic began to broadcast more live sporting events, such as special "ESPN Classic Live" telecasts of college basketball games that featured veteran commentators and older-styled graphics. Around this time, ESPN Classic also began to be used as an overflow channel for programming that could not be shown on ESPN or ESPN2 due to scheduling conflicts (these have since been moved to ESPNews); these have included additional college football and basketball games, the "ESPN Classic Game of the Week" (a Sunday rebroadcast of an ESPN/ABC-televised college football game from the previous Saturday), IRL events, live coverage of selected HBCU games (especially since the term "classic" is used for special neutral-site HBCU games), and tape-delayed UEFA Champions League soccer games.

Examples of live sporting events broadcast by ESPN Classic due to scheduling overruns on ESPN or ESPN2, include the following from the third quarter of 2007:

- A WNBA basketball game between the Sacramento Monarchs and the Seattle Storm on July 31 (originally aired on ESPN2, it was moved due to a game in which Barry Bonds attempted to tie the all-time Major League Baseball home run record and ESPN's airing of an episode of The Bronx is Burning). In addition, Game 1 of the WNBA Western Conference Final between the Phoenix Mercury and the San Antonio Silver Stars on August 30 aired on ESPN Classic, as ESPN2 aired a college football game between the University of Tulsa and University of Louisiana at Monroe (as a sidebar, the WNBA did not want the game to start at the originally-scheduled time of 10:00 p.m. Eastern Time as it was being played in San Antonio, Texas, where it would have aired at 9:00 p.m. local time; had the game started at 10:00 p.m., it would have aired on ESPN2).
- The Firestone Indy 400 IndyCar race on August 5 (which was moved from ESPN2 due to a rain delay)
- Two preliminary round games of USA Basketball in the FIBA Americas Championship in Las Vegas, Nevada on August 22 and 23 and a semifinal between the US and Puerto Rico on September 1 (ESPN2 had obtained rights, but had other program commitments)
- The third quarter of the WNBA playoff game between the Indiana Fever and Connecticut Sun on August 23, 2007. This was also scheduled for ESPN2, but it was preceded by a Little League World Series game. After an entire half went untelevised, ESPN Classic decided to pull a rebroadcast of a Major League Soccer game in favor of replacing ESPN2 as Taiwan and Japan continued a game that went very long by Little League standards. Japan would win the game in 10 innings, and ESPN2 picked up the coverage in the fourth quarter. Ironically, the WNBA game would set a record for longest playoff game as the Sun defeated the Fever in triple overtime.
- Two Champ Car World Series races in September and one in October.

Since then, these games or events had been shown live on ESPN Classic:

- The 2008 Indy Japan 300, which was won by Danica Patrick (the first female winner of an IndyCar event).
- The entirety of the 2008 NASCAR Nationwide Series Lipton Tea 250. The race was simulcast with Speed and ESPN360.com, as ESPN2 was obligated to an NBA playoff game during the scheduled time of the race (ESPN2 would later join the race in progress and air it in its entirety on tape delay). In addition, the network had planned to air the 2008 Sharpie Mini 300, picking up the coverage from ABC, had it continued; however, NASCAR called the race before its conclusion (171 out of 300 laps) because of rain. Clint Bowyer was declared the race winner.
- The College World Series game between the University of Georgia and Fresno State University on June 22, 2008, as there were a couple of days of rain-outs, and due to a baseball game being broadcast on ESPN, and a drag racing event being televised on ESPN2, the game was forced to air on ESPN Classic.
- The following World Cup qualifying matches: United States and Cuba on October 11, 2008, the November 19 match between the United States and Guatemala, and the USA-El Salvador match on September 5, 2009.
- The opening five minutes of the Winter X Games, on January 30, 2010. The event aired on ESPN2 a few minutes later, due to a runover of an Indiana-Illinois basketball game.
- The first hour of a college baseball Super Regional division series game between Texas A&M and Florida State University on June 11, 2011, due to a rain delay of a game between the University of Virginia and University of California-Irvine.

ESPN Classic also served as the official broadcaster of the annual Baseball Hall of Fame induction ceremony until 2009 (when it moved to MLB Network). On August 25, 2012, ESPN Classic aired an Atlantic League baseball game between the Sugar Land Skeeters and Bridgeport Bluefish; the game featured Major League Baseball legend Roger Clemens as a starting pitcher for the Skeeters. (In 2014, ESPN acquired permanent rights to Skeeters games, but moved the games to its online portal, ESPN3.)

While not a live event, in 2008, ESPN Classic also notably broadcast a previously untelevised college basketball game played on January 23, between Baylor and Texas A&M, which Baylor won 116–110 in five overtimes. Due to an unlikely set of circumstances, the actual game, held at Reed Arena on the A&M campus, was never televised. ESPN Classic used the feeds from the arena's in-house cameras, normally used to allow highlights to be displayed on Jumbotron screens, and the original play-by-play and commentary from A&M's radio broadcasters to create a complete telecast. The telecast aired on March 5 on ESPN Classic before the rematch between the two teams at Baylor aired on ESPN2.

ESPN Classic was also used for ESPN's multiple-perspective telecasts under the Full Circle and Megacast brands; in these cases, ESPN Classic carried the "Sounds of the Game" feed, which is broadcast without commentary.

=== Fan interactive specials ===
Beginning in the mid-2000s, ESPN Classic aired a series of specials counting down the greatest teams in the history of certain sports, as determined by fan balloting. In March 2006, the 1981-82 North Carolina Tar Heels won the fan poll for best-ever college basketball team, in October 2006, the 1927 New York Yankees won for best Major League Baseball team, and in December 2006, the 1995 Nebraska Cornhuskers won the fan poll for best-ever college football team.

Each of these programs featured expert analysis and live interactive voting online at ESPN.com, with the first votes being cast one week before the scheduled live show and continued balloting online and via text messaging until the end of the show.

== Cessation of original programming ==
On January 14, 2007, Deadspin reported that ESPN Classic would no longer develop or air original programming. It was not immediately clear what would replace such programs; however, it was assumed that shows that were already produced, but not yet aired, would be broadcast at least for a few more months.

Over the next few months, new episodes of Missing Link, Top 5 Reasons You Can't Blame and Ringside aired as scheduled. However, Missing Link was cancelled in June 2007, at which time production was also halted on the other two programs.

== List of programs broadcast by ESPN Classic ==
- 30 for 30
- Bassmaster Elite Series
- Battle of the Network Stars
- ESPN First Take Classics (2014–2021)
- Friday Night Lights
- Global Supercard Wrestling (originally aired on ESPN from 1991 to 1994)
- Home Run Derby
- Nine for IX
- The Top 5 Reasons You Can't Blame... (originally aired on ESPN2 from 2005 to 2007)
- Who's No. 1?
- 2 Minute Drill
- 60 Minutes on Classic (2004–2008)
- American Gladiators (2007–2009, originally aired in syndication from 1989 to 1996)
- AWA Championship Wrestling (originally aired on ESPN from 1986 to 1990)
- The American Sportsman
- Arliss
- Back in the Day
- Bay City Blues
- Celebrity Bowling (2010)
- Cheap Seats
- Classic Now (2005–2006)
- Classic NHRA
- ESPN Classic Remembers
- Fantasy Insider
- Greatest Sports Legends
- Instant Classic
- Jim Rome Classics
- The Joe Namath Show (2009–2014)
- Jack LaLanne
- Long Way Down
- Missing Link (2007)
- NCAA on Campus (formerly on Fox Sports Net, later on CBS College Sports)
- NFL Films (currently on NFL Network)
- Reel Classics
- Ringside (2005–2007)
- Schaap One-on-One
- SportsCenter of the Decade
- SportsCentury
- Sports Challenge
- Sunday Morning Classics
- Stump the Schwab
- Superstars
- The Way It Was (2004–2006; 2009)
- The White Shadow
- This Week In Baseball
- Tom Miranda's Advantage Adventures
- UWF Wrestling (2008, originally aired on ESPN2 in 1995)
- Woodie's World
- Wide World of Sports

== In popular culture ==
ESPN Classic was parodied in a recurring series of Saturday Night Live sketches introduced in 2009, which depicted archived broadcasts of obscure women's sports events from the 1980s; however, commentators Pete Twinkle and Greg Stink (Jason Sudeikis and Will Forte) consistently know nothing about the sports, and instead focused on promoting the absurdly-exaggerated sponsors, which are always women's hygiene products.
