= Dangerous Game (TV series) =

- Genre: Sports
- Country of origin: United States

Original release
- Network: Outdoor Life Network (2004–2006); Versus (2006–2011)
- Release: 2004 – 2011

Dangerous Game is a television series which began airing in 2004. Unlike most types of hunting which usually focuses on prey animals such as deer and rabbits, this series focuses on the hunting of predatory animals and some of the deadliest in the world, such as lions, bears, and pumas. The series began airing on the Outdoor Life Network and was picked up in 2006 by Versus. As of now, no new episodes of the series have aired on NBC Sports Network.
