= List of BattleBots episodes =

BattleBots is an American robot combat television series. Competitors design and operate remote-controlled armed and armored machines designed to fight in an arena combat elimination tournament. The following is a list of BattleBots episodes.

== Series overview ==
Season	Episodes	Originally released		
Season	Episodes	First released	Last released	Network
1	15	August 23, 2000	December 5, 2000	Comedy Central
2	19	December 12, 2000	March 6, 2001	Comedy Central
3	20	July 10, 2001	September 11, 2001	Comedy Central
4	20	January 8, 2002	March 12, 2002	Comedy Central
5	20	August 20, 2002	December 21, 2002	Comedy Central
6	6	June 21, 2015	July 26, 2015	ABC
7	10	June 23, 2016	September 1, 2016	ABC
8	20	May 11, 2018	October 5, 2018	Discovery Channel
9	16	June 7, 2019	September 27, 2019	Discovery Channel
10	14	December 3, 2020	March 11, 2021	Discovery Channel
11	14	January 6, 2022	April 7, 2022	Discovery Channel
12	19	January 5, 2023	May 25, 2023	Discovery Channel

This is counting of all seasons. It is also usual to count from 1 again after the reboot, so that season 6 is season 1 and so on.

== Episodes ==
=== Season 1 (2000) ===
Tournament Winners:

- Superheavyweight Winner – **Minion** (defeated Gray Matter, Grendel, Rammstein, and DooAll)
- Heavyweight Winner – **Vlad the Impaler** (defeated GoldDigger, Tazbot, Overkill, Punjar, and Voltarc)
- Middleweight Winner – **Hazard** (defeated Pegleg, Turtle Roadkill, Spin Orbiting Force, and Deadblow)
- Lightweight Winner – **Backlash** (defeated Disposable Hero, The Crusher, Endotherm, Das Bot, and Alpha Raptor)

No. overall	No. in season	Battle 1	Battle 2	Battle 3	Original release date
1	1	**Backlash** vs. Disposable Hero (Lightweight round of 32)	**Tentoumushi** vs. Sallad (Lightweight round of 16)	N/A	August 23, 2000
2	2	The Missing Link vs. **Ziggo** (Lightweight round of 16)	Nightmare vs. **Mauler** (Heavyweight round of 16)	**Overkill** vs. frenZy (Heavyweight round of 16)	August 30, 2000
3	3	**Voltarc** vs. Bender (Heavyweight round of 16)	**KillerHurtz** vs. Knome II (Heavyweight round of 32)	**Minion** vs. Gray Matter (Superheavyweight round 16)	September 6, 2000
4	4	**Pressure Drop** vs. Subject to Change Without Reason (Middleweight round of 16)	Shaft vs. **Mouser Mecha-Catbot** (Lightweight round of 16)	**Vlad the Impaler** vs. Tazbot (Heavyweight round of 16)	September 13, 2000
5	5	**Backlash** vs. The Crusher (Lightweight round of 16)	**Blade Runner** vs. Bad Attitude (Middleweight round of 16)	Diesector vs. **Grendel** (Superheavyweight round of 16)	September 20, 2000
6	6	**DooAll** vs. S.L.A.M. (Superheavyweight round of 16)	**BioHazard** vs. Mjollnir (Heavyweight round of 32)	Lightweight Rumble	September 27, 2000
7	7	**Voltarc** vs. BioHazard (Heavyweight Quarter-Finals)	Mechadon vs. **Rammstein** (Superheavyweight Quarter-Finals)	**Alpha Raptor** vs. Tentoumushi (Lightweight Quarter-Finals)	October 4, 2000
8	8	Alien Gladiator vs. **Deadblow** (Middleweight Quarter-Finals)	Ankle Biter vs. **Pressure Drop** (Middleweight Quarter-Finals)	Grendel vs. **Minion** (Superheavyweight Quarter-Finals)	October 11, 2000
9	9	Mouser Mecha-Catbot vs. **Alpha Raptor** (Lightweight Semi-Finals)	Das Bot vs. **Backlash** (Lightweight Semi-Finals)	Alpha Raptor vs. **Backlash** (Lightweight Finals)	October 18, 2000
10	10	**Spin Orbiting Force** vs. Blade Runner (Middleweight Quarter-Finals)	**Hazard** vs. Turtle Road Kill (Middleweight Quarter-Finals)	Ginsu vs. **Ronin** (Superheavyweight Quarter-Finals)	October 25, 2000
11	11	**Vlad the Impaler** vs. OverKill (Heavyweight Quarter-Finals)	Gammatron vs. **Punjar** (Heavyweight Quarter-Finals)	**KillerHurtz** vs Mauler (Heavyweight Quarter-Finals)	November 8, 2000
12	12	**Vlad the Impaler** vs. Punjar (Heavyweight Semi-Finals)	**Deadblow** vs. Pressure Drop (Middleweight Semi-Finals)	**Minion** vs. Rammstein (Superheavyweight Semi-Finals)	November 15, 2000
13	13	Spin Orbiting Force vs. **Hazard** (Middleweight Semi-finals)	KillerHurtz vs. **Voltarc** (Heavyweight Semi-finals )	Ronin vs. **DooAll** (Superheavyweight Semi-Finals)	November 22, 2000
14	14	Deadblow vs. **Hazard** (Middleweight Finals)	**Vlad the Impaler** vs. Voltarc (Heavyweight Finals)	**Minion** vs. DooAll (Superheavyweight Finals)	November 29, 2000
15	15	Middleweight Rumble	Heavyweight Rumble	N/A	December 5, 2000

=== Season 2 (2000–01) ===
Tournament Winners: November 2000, Las Vegas: (Winners shown in bold)

- Superheavyweight Winner – **Diesector** (defeated Hamunaptra, World Peace, Rammstein, War Machine, and Atomic Wedgie)
- Heavyweight Winner – **BioHazard** (defeated M.O.E., Suicidal Tendencies, Nightmare, frenZy, and Vlad the Impaler)
- Middleweight Winner – **Spaz** (defeated Tobor Rabies, Blue Streak, Buddy Lee Don't Play in the Street, Bad Attitude, and El Diablo)
- Lightweight Winner – **Ziggo** (defeated Scrap Metal, Scrap Daddy LW55, Afterthought 2.0, Beta Raptor, and Backlash)

No. overall	No. in season	Battle 1	Battle 2	Battle 3	Original release date
16	1	Mecha Tentoumushi vs. **Evil Fish Tank** (Lightweight round of 16)	N/A	N/A	December 12, 2000
17	2	Mauler 51-50 vs. **Bigger Brother** (Heavyweight round of 32)	Snake vs. **War Machine** (Superheavyweight round of 16)	**Toe-Crusher** vs. No Tolerance III (Lightweight round of 16)	December 12, 2000
18	3	**Vlad the Impaler** vs. Mjollnir (Heavyweight round of 16)	Turbo vs. **Buddy Lee Don't Play in the Street** (Middleweight round of 16)	**Chinkilla** vs. Ginsu (Exhibition match)	December 12, 2000
19	4	**frenZy** vs. Panic Attack (Heavyweight round of 16)	**BioHazard** vs. Suicidal Tendencies (Heavyweight round of 16)	**GoldDigger** vs. KillerHurtz (Heavyweight round of 16)	December 19, 2000
20	5	Scrap Daddy LW55 vs. **Ziggo** (Lightweight round of 16)	OverKill vs. **FrostBite** (Heavyweight round of 16)	**Sallad** vs. Mouser Mecha-Catbot (Lightweight round of 16)	December 26, 2000
21	6	**Voltronic** vs. Bigger Brother (Heavyweight round of 16)	**Complete Control** vs. Super Chiabot (Middleweight round of 16)	**Atomic Wedgie** vs. Minion (Superheavyweight round of 16)	January 2, 2001
Battle 4: Tripulta Raptor vs. **Toro** (Superheavyweight round of 16)
22	7	**Deadblow** vs. Kegger (Middleweight round of 16)	**Blade Runner** vs. Scrap Daddy MW110 (Middleweight round of 16)	Subject to Change Without Reason vs. **The Master** (Middleweight round of 16)	January 9, 2001
23	8	**Ziggo** vs. Afterthought 2.0 (Lightweight Quarter-Finals)	Tazbot vs. **Vlad the Impaler** (Heavyweight Quarter-Finals)	Nightmare vs. **BioHazard** (Heavyweight Quarter-Finals)	January 16, 2001
24	9	**Revision Z** vs. Ronin (Superheavyweight Quarter-Finals)	**Spaz** vs. Buddy Lee Don't Play in the Street (Middleweight Quarter-Finals)	Blade Runner vs. **The Master** (Middleweight Quarter-Finals)	January 23, 2001
25	10	**Diesector** vs. Rammstein (Superheavyweight Quarter-Finals)	**Toe-Crusher** vs. Evil Fish Tank (Lightweight Quarter-Finals)	Deadblow vs. **Bad Attitude** (Middleweight Quarter-Finals)	January 30, 2001
26	11	**Atomic Wedgie** vs. Toro (Superheavyweight Quarter-Finals)	**El Diablo** vs. Complete Control (Middleweight Quarter-Finals)	GoldDigger vs **frenZy** (Heavyweight Quarter-Finals)	February 6, 2001
Battle 4: **Backlash** vs. Sallad (Lightweight Quarter-Finals)
27	12	FrostBite vs. **Voltronic** (Heavyweight Quarter-Finals)	**War Machine** vs. DooAll (Superheavyweight Quarter-Finals)	The Crusher vs. **Beta Raptor** (Lightweight Quarter-Finals)	February 6, 2001
28	13	**Ziggo** vs. Beta Raptor (Lightweight Semi-Finals)	**Backlash** vs. Toe-Crusher (Lightweight Semi-Finals )	Backlash vs. **Ziggo** (Lightweight Finals)	February 13, 2001
29	14	**Vlad the Impaler** vs. Voltronic (Heavyweight Semi-Finals)	frenZy vs. **BioHazard** (Heavyweight Semi-Finals)	Vlad the Impaler vs. **BioHazard** (Heavyweight Finals)	February 13, 2001
30	15	**Revision Z** vs. Gray Matter (Superheavyweight Round of 16)	Revision Z vs. **Atomic Wedgie** (Superheavyweight Semi-Finals)	N/A	February 20, 2001
31	16	Heavyweight Rumble 1	**Diesector** vs. War Machine (Superheavyweight Semi-Finals)	**Diesector** vs. Atomic Wedgie (Superheavyweight Finals)	February 20, 2001
32	17	**Bad Attitude** vs. SABotage (Middleweight round of 16)	Bad Attitude vs. **Spaz** (Middleweight Semi-finals)	Middleweight Rumble	February 27, 2001
33	18	Ankle Biter vs. **El Diablo** (Middleweight round of 16)	Superheavyweight Rumble	El Diablo vs. **Spaz** (Middleweight Finals)	February 27, 2001
34	19	Heavyweight Rumble 2	Lightweight Rumble	N/A	March 6, 2001

=== Season 3 (2001) ===
Tournament Winners: May 2001, Treasure Island (Winners shown in bold)

- Superheavyweight Winner – **Vladiator** (defeated JuggerBot, Hammertime, Revision Z, Techno Destructo, Diesector, and Minion)
- Heavyweight Winner – **Son of Whyachi** (defeated Shaka, Crab Meat, Kill-O-Amp, Nightmare, MechaVore, HexaDecimator, and BioHazard)
- Middleweight Winner – **Hazard** (defeated Fusion, Zion, F5, T-Wrex, and Little Drummer Boy)
- Lightweight Winner – **Dr. Inferno Jr.** (defeated Blood Dragon, Toe-Crusher, Bad Habit, Herr Gepoünden, Sallad, and Gamma Raptor)

No. overall	No. in season	Battle 1	Battle 2	Battle 3	Original release date
35	1	**Nightmare** vs. Slam Job (Heavyweight round of 32)	Shish-ka-bot 1.1 vs. **Trilobot** (Lightweight round of 64)	**Minion** vs. Ogre (Super heavyweight round of 16)	July 10, 2001
36	2	**Double Agent** vs. Turbo (Middleweight round of 32)	**Toro** vs. World Peace (Super heavyweight round of 16)	N/A	July 10, 2001
37	3	Hammertime vs. **Vladiator** (Super heavyweight round of 32)	Toe-Crusher vs. **Dr. Inferno Jr.** (Lightweight round of 32)	**Little Sister** vs. Gammatron (Heavyweight round of 64)	July 17, 2001
38	4	Subject to Change Without Reason vs. **Complete Control** (Middleweight round of 32)	Bad Attitude vs. **T-Wrex** (Middleweight round of 16)	**HexaDecimator** vs. Fork-N-Stein (Heavyweight round of 64)	July 17, 2001
39	5	**Ziggo** vs. Wacker (Lightweight round of 32)	Vlad the Impaler vs. **MechaVore** (Heavyweight round of 16)	CUAD the Crusher vs. **Techno Destructo** (Super heavyweight round of 32)	July 24, 2001
40	6	**BattleRat** vs. Crash Test Dummy (Heavyweight round of 64)	Little Sister vs. **BioHazard** (Heavyweight round of 32)	**Little Drummer Boy** vs. Blade Runner (Middleweight round of 16)	July 24, 2001
41	7	Rim Tin Tin vs. **HammerHead** (Lightweight round of 64)	**Son of Whyachi** vs. Nightmare (Heavyweight round of 16)	Omega-13 vs. **KillerHurtz** (Heavyweight round of 16)	July 31, 2001
Battle 4: Chinkilla vs. Nibbler, Reactore, SMD, Mordicus, Gungnire, and General Gau (Exhibition match, no winner)
42	8	**Sallad** vs. Carnage Raptor (Lightweight round of 32)	Ankle Biter vs. **F5** (Middleweight round of 32)	**Blood Moon** vs. Shaft (Lightweight round of 64)	July 31, 2001
43	9	**Rammstein** vs. The Judge (Super heavyweight round of 16)	**Twin Paradox** vs. Deadblow (Middleweight round of 16)	I-Beam vs. **Greenspan** (Heavyweight round of 64)	August 7, 2001
Battle 4: Sisyphus vs. **Death By Monkeys** (Lightweight round of 32)
44	10	**Tazbot** vs. GoldDigger (Heavyweight round of 16)	**OverKill** vs. M.O.E. (Heavyweight round of 64)	**Voltronic** vs. Bacchus (Heavyweight round of 16)	August 7, 2001
45	11	Blood Moon vs. **Mouser Super Mecha-Catbot** (Lightweight round of 32)	Zion vs. **Hazard** (Middleweight round of 16)	**SABotage** vs. Double Agent (Middleweight round of 16)	August 14, 2001
46	12	**T-Minus** vs. Sunshine Lollibot (Middleweight round of 16)	Dawn of Destruction vs. **Diesector** (Super heavyweight round of 16)	**Wedge of Doom** vs. The Wacky Compass (Lightweight round of 64)	August 14, 2001
47	13	**Ziggo** vs. Shrike (Lightweight round of 16)	Tazbot vs. **BioHazard** (Heavyweight Quarter-Finals)	Phere vs. **Toro** (Super heavyweight quarter-finals)	August 21, 2001
48	14	**Diesector** vs. Rammstein (Super heavyweight quarter-finals)	Techno Destructo vs. **Vladiator** (Super heavyweight quarter-finals)	**Chinkilla** vs. La Machine, Dreadnought, and Ginsu (Exhibition match)	August 21, 2001
49	15	KillerHurtz vs. **HexaDecimator** (Heavyweight Quarter-Finals)	Electric Lunch vs. **Minion** (Super heavyweight quarter-finals)	MechaVore vs. **Son of Whyachi** (Heavyweight Quarter-Finals)	August 28, 2001
50	16	**Son of Whyachi** vs. HexaDecimator (Heavyweight Semi-finals)	OverKill vs. **BioHazard** (Heavyweight Semi-finals)	**Son of Whyachi** vs. BioHazard (Heavyweight Finals)	August 28, 2001
51	17	Herr Gepoünden vs. **Dr. Inferno Jr.** (Lightweight Quarter-Finals)	T-Minus vs. **T-Wrex** (Middleweight Quarter-Finals)	**Gamma Raptor** vs. Mouser Super Mecha-Catbot (Lightweight Quarter-Finals)	September 4, 2001
52	18	**Vladiator** vs. Diesector (Super heavyweight Semi-finals)	**Minion** vs. Toro (Super heavyweight Semi-finals)	Minion vs. **Vladiator** (Super heavyweight Finals)	September 4, 2001
53	19	T-Wrex vs. **Hazard** (Middleweight Semi-finals)	**Little Drummer Boy** vs. SABotage (Middleweight Semi-finals)	Little Drummer Boy vs. **Hazard** (Middleweight Finals)	September 11, 2001
54	20	Sallad vs. **Dr. Inferno Jr.** (Lightweight Semi-finals)	**Gamma Raptor** vs. Wedge of Doom (Lightweight Semi-finals)	**Dr. Inferno Jr.** vs. Gamma Raptor (Lightweight Finals)	September 11, 2001

=== Season 4 (2002) ===
Tournament Winners: November 2001, Treasure Island: (Winners shown in bold)

- Superheavyweight Winner – **Toro** (defeated Maximus, The Judge, Vladiator, Little Blue Engine, and New Cruelty)
- Heavyweight Winner – **BioHazard** (defeated Stealth Terminator, Jabberwock, Nightmare, Tazbot, and OverKill)
- Middleweight Winner – **Hazard** (defeated Timmy, SABotage, El Diablo, Heavy Metal Noise and Complete Control)
- Lightweight Winner – **Ziggo** (defeated SnowFlake, Serial Box Killer, Wedge of Doom, Death By Monkeys, and The Big B)

No. overall	No. in season	Battle 1	Battle 2	Battle 3	Battle 4	Original release date
55	1	**Phrizbee** vs. Deathstar (Heavyweight round of 64)	Ravager vs. **T-Minus** (Middleweight round of 64)	Fantom Thrust vs. **The Probe** (Super heavyweight round of 64)	Scrap Daddy Surplus vs. **Wedge of Doom** (Lightweight round of 32)	January 8, 2002
56	2	TriMangle vs. **Vladiator** (Super heavyweight round of 32)	**Sharkbyte** vs. KillerB (Heavyweight round of 32)	**Ziggo** vs. SnowFlake (Lightweight round of 32)	N/A	January 8, 2002
57	3	**Ziggo** vs. Serial Box Killer (Lightweight round of 16)	Eradicator vs. **Swirlee** (Super heavyweight round of 64)	**Maximus** vs. Pharmapac (Super heavyweight round of 64)	Toe-Crusher vs. **Low Blow** (Lightweight round of 32)	January 15, 2002
58	4	Malvolio vs. **Bad Attitude** (Middleweight round of 32)	Bender vs. **Little Sister** (Heavyweight round of 64)	Tentoumushi 7.0 vs. **Wedge of Doom** (Lightweight round of 16)	N/A	January 15, 2002
59	5	**Surgeon General** vs. FrostBite (Heavyweight round of 32)	**Hazard** vs. Timmy (Middleweight round of 32)	Short Order Chef vs. **T-Minus** (Middleweight round of 32)	**Slap 'Em Silly** vs. Mouser Classic Mecha-Catbot (Lightweight round of 32)	January 22, 2002
60	6	El Diablo Grande vs. **SlamJob** (Heavyweight round of 64)	**M.O.E.** vs. PyRAMidroid (Heavyweight round of 64)	**El Diablo** vs. Turtle Road Kill (Middleweight round of 16)	N/A	January 22, 2002
61	7	Son of Whyachi vs. **Swirlee** (Super heavyweight round of 32)	**MechaVore** vs. Towering Inferno (Heavyweight round of 32)	Afterthought vs. **Slap 'Em Silly** (Lightweight round of 16)	**Carnage Raptor** vs. Whirligig (Lightweight round of 32)	January 29, 2002
62	8	Atomic Wedgie vs. **Ogre** (Super heavyweight round of 32)	Phrizbee vs. **HexaDecimator** (Heavyweight round of 32)	**The Matador** vs. Omega-13 (Heavyweight round of 32)	N/A	January 29, 2002
63	9	**Heavy Metal Noise** vs. T-Minus (Middleweight round of 16)	**Ziggo** vs. Wedge of Doom (Lightweight Quarter-Finals)	**Toro** vs. Maximus (Super heavyweight round of 32)	N/A	February 5, 2002
64	10	**Ziggo** vs. Death By Monkeys (Lightweight Semi-finals)	Minion vs. **No Apologies** (Super heavyweight round of 32)	Hammertime vs. **The Judge** (Super heavyweight round of 32)	**Ziggo** vs. The Big B (Lightweight Finals)	February 5, 2002
65	11	**Toro** vs. The Judge (Super heavyweight round of 16)	Ogre vs. **Techno Destructo** (Super heavyweight round of 16)	Junkyard Offspring vs. **Nightmare** (Heavyweight round of 32)	Ronin vs. **Diesector** (Super heavyweight round of 16)	February 12, 2002
66	12	**New Cruelty** vs. Odin II (Super heavyweight round of 32)	**Toro** vs. Vladiator (Super heavyweight quarter-finals)	Techno Destructo vs. **Diesector** (Super heavyweight quarter-finals)	N/A	February 12, 2002
67	13	Little Blue Engine vs. **Toro** (Super heavyweight Semi-finals)	**Stealth Terminator** vs. Center Punch (Heavyweight round of 64)	Diesector vs. **New Cruelty** (Super heavyweight Semi-finals)	N/A	February 19, 2002
68	14	**Toro** vs. New Cruelty (Super heavyweight Finals)	**Silverback** vs. Agitator (Heavyweight round of 64)	Pack Raptors vs. **SABotage** (Middleweight round of 32)	N/A	February 19, 2002
69	15	SABotage vs. **Hazard** (Middleweight round of 16)	**Huggy Bear** vs. Double Agent (Middleweight round of 32)	Mauler 51-50 vs. **Jabberwock** (Heavyweight round of 32)	Silverback vs. **Tazbot** (Heavyweight round of 32)	February 26, 2002
70	16	**Complete Control** vs. Psychotron (Middleweight round of 16)	BattleRat vs. **Nightmare** (Heavyweight round of 16)	Bad Attitude vs. **Complete Control** (Middleweight Quarter-Finals)	N/A	February 26, 2002
71	17	The Matador vs. **M.O.E.** (Heavyweight round of 16)	**Hazard** vs. El Diablo (Middleweight Quarter-Finals)	**OverKill** vs MechaVore (Heavyweight round of 16)	**BioHazard** vs. Nightmare (Heavyweight Quarter-Finals)	March 5, 2002
72	18	**KillerHurtz** vs Little Sister (Heavyweight round of 32)	Sharkbyte vs **HexaDecimator** (Heavyweight round of 16)	**SlamJob** vs. frenZy (Heavyweight round of 32)	KillerHurtz vs. **Surgeon General** (Heavyweight round of 16)	March 5, 2002
73	19	Heavy Metal Noise vs. **Hazard** (Middleweight Semi-finals)	**Complete Control** vs. Zion (Middleweight Semi-finals)	**Surgeon General** vs. HexaDecimator (Heavyweight Quarter-Finals)	**Hazard** vs. Complete Control (Middleweight Finals)	March 12, 2002
74	20	Surgeon General vs. **OverKill** (Heavyweight Semi-finals)	**BioHazard** vs. Tazbot (Heavyweight Semi-finals)	**BioHazard** vs. OverKill (Heavyweight Finals)	N/A	March 12, 2002

=== Season 5 (2002) ===
Tournament Winners: May 2002, Treasure Island: (Winners shown in bold)

- Superheavyweight Winner – **Diesector** (defeated Final Destiny, Dreadnought, Hammertime, New Cruelty, and Vladiator)
- Heavyweight Winner – **BioHazard** (defeated Center Punch, Greenspan, MechaVore, Aces and Eights, and Voltronic)
- Middleweight Winner – **T-Minus** (defeated TriDent, Double Agent, Huggy Bear, previously undefeated Hazard, and S.O.B.)
- Lightweight Winner – **Dr. Inferno Jr.** (defeated Afterburner, Tentoumushi 8.0, Death By Monkeys, Gamma Raptor, and Wedge of Doom)

No. overall	No. in season	Battle 1	Battle 2	Battle 3	Original release date
75	1	**Warhead** vs. Darkstar-2J (Heavyweight round of 64)	Ziggo vs. **Code:BLACK** (Lightweight round of 32)	**Son of Whyachi** vs. Steel Reign (Super heavyweight round of 32)	August 20, 2002
Battle 4: Moebius vs. **Ankle Biter** (Middleweight round of 64)
76	2	**Backlash** vs. Burning Metal (Lightweight round of 32)	Wee Willy Wedgy vs. **Little Drummer Boy** (Middleweight round of 32)	M.O.E. vs. **Stealth Terminator** (Heavyweight round of 32)	August 27, 2002
Battle 4: **Slap 'Em Silly** vs. Rambite 2.0 (Lightweight round of 32)
77	3	**Wedge of Doom** vs. Wireless Wonder (Lightweight round of 32)	Twin Paradox vs. **S.O.B.** (Middleweight round of 32)	**Codebreaker** vs. Techno Destructo (Super heavyweight round of 32)	September 3, 2002
Battle 4: Nightmare vs. **Warhead** (Heavyweight round of 32)
78	4	**Hazard** vs. Misty the WonderBot (Middleweight round of 32)	Patriot vs. **Sallad** (Lightweight round of 32)	**The Matador** vs. frenZy (Heavyweight round of 32)	September 10, 2002
Battle 4: **No Apologies** vs. The Judge (Super heavyweight round of 32)
79	5	**Wrath Jr.** vs. Complete Control (Middleweight round of 32)	Toro vs. **Phrizbee-Ultimate** (Super heavyweight round of 32)	**Vladiator** vs. Pro-AM (Super heavyweight round of 32)	September 21, 2002
80	6	Gammacide vs. **Dreadnought** (Super heavyweight round of 32)	Sublime vs. **Death By Monkeys** (Lightweight round of 32)	**Final Destiny** vs. Gray Matter (Super heavyweight round of 64)	September 28, 2002
81	7	Vlad the Impaler II vs. **Spitfire** (Heavyweight round of 64)	**T-Minus** vs. TriDent (Middleweight round of 32)	Tazbot vs. **Ringmaster** (Heavyweight round of 32)	October 5, 2002
82	8	Phrizbee-Ultimate vs. **IceBerg** (Super heavyweight round of 16)	**Diesector** vs. Final Destiny (Super heavyweight round of 32)	**Ankle Biter** vs. El Diablo (Middleweight round of 32)	October 12, 2002
83	9	**Codebreaker** vs. Minion (Super heavyweight round of 16)	The Master vs. **Ankle Biter** (Middleweight round of 16)	**Hazard** vs. Blade Runner (Middleweight round of 16)	October 19, 2002
84	10	Sallad vs. **Hexy Jr.** (Lightweight round of 16)	Atomic Wedgie vs. **Maximus** (Super heavyweight round of 16)	**BioHazard** vs. Greenspan (Heavyweight round of 16)	October 26, 2002
85	11	T-Wrex vs. **S.O.B.** (Middleweight round of 16)	Double Agent vs. **T-Minus** (Middleweight round of 16)	BattleRat vs. **OverKill** (Heavyweight round of 16)	November 2, 2002
86	12	**Warhead** vs. The Matador (Heavyweight round of 16)	Dreadnought vs. **Diesector** (Super heavyweight round of 16)	**MechaVore** vs. Mauler 51-50 (Heavyweight round of 16)	November 9, 2002
87	13	**Dr. Inferno Jr.** vs. Tentoumushi 8.0 (Lightweight round of 16)	Son of Whyachi vs. **No Apologies** (Super heavyweight round of 16)	Bad Attitude vs. **Huggy Bear** (Middleweight round of 16)	November 16, 2002
88	14	**Zion** vs. SABotage (Middleweight round of 16)	Slap 'Em Silly vs. **Wedge of Doom** (Lightweight round of 16)	N/A	November 23, 2002
89	15	**Turtle** vs. Ankle Biter (Middleweight Quarter-Finals)	Huggy Bear vs. **T-Minus** (Middleweight Quarter-Finals)	Zion vs. **Hazard** (Middleweight Quarter-Finals)	November 30, 2002
90	16	**S.O.B.** vs. Turtle (Middleweight Semi-finals)	Hazard vs. **T-Minus** (Middleweight Semi-finals)	**T-Minus** vs. S.O.B. (Middleweight Finals)	December 7, 2002
91	17	MechaVore vs. **BioHazard** (Heavyweight Quarter-Finals)	Warhead vs. **OverKill** (Heavyweight Quarter-Finals)	**Aces and Eights** vs. HexaDecimator (Heavyweight Quarter-Finals)	December 14, 2002
Battle 4: **BioHazard** vs. Voltronic (Heavyweight Finals)
92	18	Codebreaker vs. **Vladiator** (Super heavyweight quarter-finals)	**Diesector** vs. Hammertime (Super heavyweight quarter-finals)	**Maximus** vs. IceBerg (Super heavyweight quarter-finals)	December 14, 2002
93	19	**Wedge of Doom** vs. Code:BLACK (Lightweight Semi-Finals)	**Dr. Inferno Jr.** vs. Gamma Raptor (Lightweight Semi-finals)	**Dr. Inferno Jr.** vs. Wedge of Doom (Lightweight Finals)	December 21, 2002
94	20	**Vladiator** vs. Maximus (Super heavyweight Semi-finals)	**Diesector** vs. New Cruelty (Super heavyweight Semi-finals)	**Diesector** vs. Vladiator (Super heavyweight Finals)	December 21, 2002

=== Season 6 (2015) ===
Sometimes referred to as Season 1, starting from when the series was rebooted by ABC.

Winner: Bite Force

No. overall	No. in season	Title	Original release date	U.S. viewers (millions)
95	1	"The Battle Begins: Qualifiers, Part 1"	June 21, 2015	5.44
96	2	"Crunch Time: Qualifiers, Part 2"	June 28, 2015	4.84
97	3	"Full Metal Bracket: Round of 16 Part 1"	July 5, 2015	4.15
98	4	"Last Chance to Advance: Round of 16 Part 2"	July 12, 2015	4.07
99	5	"The Great 8: Quarterfinals"	July 19, 2015	4.45
100	6	"One Bot Rules Them All: Final 4/Finals"	July 26, 2015	4.62

=== Season 7 (2016) ===
Sometimes referred to as Season 2, starting from when the series was rebooted by ABC.

Winner: Tombstone

No. overall	No. in season	Title	Original release date	U.S. viewers (millions)
101	1	"The Gears Awaken"	May 10, 2016	1.97
102	2	"Robots Activate: Qualifying Round Begins"	June 23, 2016	3.91
103	3	"There Will Be Bot Blood: The Qualifying Round Concludes"	June 30, 2016	3.59
104	4	"We're Gonna Need a Bigger Bracket: The Round of 32, Part 1"	July 7, 2016	3.45
105	5	"Shake, Battle and Roll: The Round of 32, Part 2"	July 21, 2016	2.96
106	6	"The Good, the Bot, and the Ugly: The Round of 32 Concludes"	July 28, 2016	3.24
107	7	"Not So Sweet 16: The Round of 16 Part 1"	August 4, 2016	3.32
108	8	"Rise of the Machines: The Round of 16 Part 2"	August 25, 2016	3.43
109	9	"Gr8 Expectations: The Quarterfinals"	September 1, 2016	5.61
110	10	"One Shining Bot: The Championship"	September 1, 2016	5.61

=== Season 8 (2018) ===
Sometimes referred to as Season 3, starting from when the series was rebooted by ABC.

Winner: Bite Force

No. overall	No. in season	Title	Original release date	U.S. viewers (millions)
111	1	"It's Robot Fighting Time!"	May 11, 2018	1.03
112	2	"Are You Yeti to Rumble?"	May 18, 2018	1.02
113	3	"Everyone Wants to Be the Hotshot"	May 25, 2018	0.94
114	4	"There's No Tapping Out in BattleBots!"	June 1, 2018	1.01
115	5	"Just Keep Spinning"	June 8, 2018	0.96
116	6	"It's a Flippin' Robot Party!"	June 15, 2018	1.00
117	7	"It's Fork Lifting Time!"	June 22, 2018	0.92
118	8	"I'm Here to Kick Some Bot"	June 29, 2018	0.93
119	9	"Ice, Ice, Baby"	July 6, 2018	0.84
120	10	"A Smashing Good Time"	July 13, 2018	0.90
121	11	"The Desperado Tournament"	August 3, 2018	0.72
122	12	"This Is BattleBots!"	August 10, 2018	0.74
123	13	"The Rematch"	August 17, 2018	0.83
124	14	"It's Going to Be a Flippin' Blast!"	August 24, 2018	0.84
125	15	"USA vs. the World"	August 31, 2018	0.76
126	16	"A Bull in a Bot Shop"	September 7, 2018	1.03
127	17	"Last Chance Rumble"	September 14, 2018	0.83
128	18	"It's Tournament Time"	September 21, 2018	0.98
129	19	"The Tournament"	September 28, 2018	0.76
130	20	"Championship Night"	October 5, 2018	0.81

=== Season 9 (2019) ===
Sometimes referred to as Season 4, starting from when the series was rebooted by ABC.

Winner: Bite Force

No. overall	No. in season	Title	Original release date	U.S. viewers (millions)
131	1	"Let the Bot Battles Begin! (part 1)/That's What You Call a KO! (part 2)"	May 31, 2019 (online); June 7, 2019 (Discovery Channel)	0.741
132	2	"You Mess with the Bull, You Get the Drum"	June 14, 2019	0.849
133	3	"Don't FLIP OUT!"	June 21, 2019	0.842
134	4	"A Duck Only a Mother Could Love"	June 28, 2019	0.997
135	5	"A Family Affair"	July 5, 2019	0.872
136	6	"Buckers and Brawlers"	July 12, 2019	0.817
137	7	"The Most Destructive Robot"	July 19, 2019	0.911
138	8	"The Desperado Tournament II"	July 26, 2019	0.872
139	9	"Eyes on the Prize"	August 9, 2019	0.897
140	10	"Flips, Fires, and Flinches"	August 16, 2019	0.802
141	11	"Like a Bot to a Flame"	August 23, 2019	0.881
142	12	"This Is Gonna Be Huge"	August 30, 2019	0.796
143	13	"One Flipper to Rule Them All"	September 6, 2019	0.846
144	14	"Live to Die Another Day"	September 13, 2019	0.860
145	15	"My Super Sweet 16"	September 20, 2019	0.806
146	16	"2019 BattleBots World Championship"	September 27, 2019	0.914

=== Season 10 (2020–21) ===
Sometimes referred to as Season 5, starting from when the series was rebooted by ABC.

Winner: End Game

No. overall	No. in season	Title	Original release date	U.S. viewers (millions)
147	1	"Return of the Bots"	December 3, 2020	0.991
148	2	"Let the Big Bot Battle Begin"	December 10, 2020	0.906
149	3	"Stop! Hammer Time!"	December 17, 2020	0.866
150	4	"Blood, Sweat and Gears"	December 24, 2020	0.859
151	5	"Sin City Slasher"	January 7, 2021	0.832
152	6	"Battle of the Undefeated"	January 14, 2021	0.910
153	7	"Turning Up the Heat"	January 21, 2021	0.763
154	8	"Hit the Jackpot!"	January 28, 2021	0.840
155	9	"Now or Never"	February 4, 2021	0.849
156	10	"Qualify! Or Wave Goodbye!"	February 11, 2021	0.766
157	11	"Survive and Advance"	February 18, 2021	0.828
158	12	"We're Beast Slayin' Tonight!"	February 25, 2021	0.910
159	13	"Shock and Awe"	March 4, 2021	0.892
160	14	"The World Championship Finals"	March 11, 2021	0.949

=== Season 11 (2022) ===
Sometimes referred to as Season 6, starting from when the series was rebooted by ABC.

Winner: Tantrum

No. overall	No. in season	Title	Original release date	U.S. viewers (millions)
161	1	"Slash and Burn!"	January 6, 2022	0.954
162	2	"I Like Big Bots (That Will Not Die)"	January 13, 2022	0.819
163	3	"Ducks, Dragons, Killer Snakes – What a Zoo!"	January 20, 2022	0.820
164	4	"Out With the Old"	January 27, 2022	0.814
165	5	"Let's Uppercut to the Chase!"	February 3, 2022	0.882
166	6	"Bigger Than Bots"	February 10, 2022	0.649
167	7	"Edges, Wedges and Wheels"	February 17, 2022	0.660
168	8	"Flip the Script"	February 24, 2022	0.739
169	9	"Put Up or Shut Up"	March 3, 2022	0.692
170	10	"To The Victor, Go the Spoils"	March 10, 2022	0.748
171	11	"Let the Tournament Begin!"	March 17, 2022	0.725
172	12	"8 Down, 8 to Go"	March 24, 2022	0.745
173	13	"Round of 16"	March 31, 2022	0.789
174	14	"Battlebots: The Finals"	April 7, 2022	0.769

=== Season 12 (2023) ===
Sometimes referred to as Season 7, starting from when the series was rebooted by ABC.

Winner: SawBlaze

No. overall	No. in season	Title	Original release date	U.S. viewers (millions)
175	1	"ROBOTS, READY!!!"	January 5, 2023	0.666
176	2	"What the Flip?"	January 12, 2023	0.671
177	3	"Strike While the Bot's Hot"	January 19, 2023	0.637
178	4	"0 and 2. Am I Through?"	January 26, 2023	0.682
179	5	"Bad Blood"	February 2, 2023	0.741
180	6	"Robot Redemption"	February 9, 2023	0.560
181	7	"Violent Night"	February 16, 2023	0.586
182	8	"Mirror, Mirror"	February 23, 2023	0.606
183	9	"You Want a Pizza Me?"	March 2, 2023	0.647
184	10	"Mid-Season Mayhem"	March 9, 2023	0.483
185	11	"Never Say Die"	March 30, 2023	0.581
186	12	"Jaws and Claws"	April 6, 2023	0.598
187	13	"Pizza Party"	April 13, 2023	0.597
188	14	"The Unbeatables"	April 20, 2023	0.589
189	15	"The Big Reveal"	April 27, 2023	0.537
190	16	"World Championship VII Round of 32"	May 4, 2023	0.537
191	17	"8 More to Fall"	May 11, 2023	0.478
192	18	"Round of 16"	May 18, 2023	0.461
193	19	"World Championship VII Finals"	May 25, 2023	0.690
