= BattleBots season 8 =

BattleBots
- Season 8

Release
- Original network: Discovery; Science
- Original release: May 11 – October 5, 2018

Season chronology
- ← Previous; Season 7 Next → Season 9

The eighth season of the American competitive television series BattleBots premiered on Discovery on May 11, 2018. This is the first season of Battlebots to premiere on Discovery Channel and the third season since the show was rebooted in 2015. Encore episodes debuted on Science Channel on May 16, 2018.

In February 2018, Discovery Channel and Science Channel announced that it had picked up BattleBots after it was unofficially cancelled at ABC, marking the second time in the series' history that new episodes premiered on a new network. It features the "biggest, baddest, strongest and fastest next-generation robots from all over the world" as they battle it out in the battle arena for a chance to win the Robot Combat Sports championship.

Former UFC fighter Kenny Florian and MLB/NFL Sportscaster Chris Rose returned from the last two seasons to host this eighth season of BattleBots on Discovery. Also returning is Faruq Tauheed as the arena announcer. Former Battlebots judge Jessica Chobot replaced Alison Haislip as the sideline and behind the scenes reporter.

== Judges ==
The current judges are the former Battlebots "bad boy" Derek Young, esports "maven" Naomi Kyle, and legendary roboticist Mark Setrakian. The guest judge (episode 3) was special effects "guru" Frank Ippolito. For episode 7, Grant Imahara from MythBusters and NASA systems engineer Bobak Ferdowsi, who worked on the Mars Landing, were guest judges. Episode 9 featured former BattleBots sideline correspondent Alison Haislip as a guest judge. Lisa Winter 2015 captain of team Plan X and 2016 captain of team Mega Tento is a guest judge as well. Episode 15 featured YouTube star Simone Giertz as a guest judge.

== Contestants ==
This season, 55 robots weighing a maximum of 250 pounds have the chance to fight up to four times each. Their goal is to earn a top 16 ranking and qualify for the post-season where there will be knockout rounds until a winner-take-all fight to crown the 2018 BattleBots World Champion. The contestants hailed from all over the world including: Brazil, Canada, Netherlands, New Zealand, United Kingdom and the United States.

A 56th robot, Raven, was supposed to compete in BattleBots, but due to its unfinished state and time constraints, it never made it into the competition.

Contestants

Robot	Builder(s)	Hometown	Fight Record	Returned for Season 9
(Florida) Axe Backwards	Kurt Durjan	Palm City, FL	1–3	Yes
(New Jersey) Bale Spear*	Earl Pancoast III	Salem, NJ	0–3	No
(Canada) Basilisk*	Lucas Sloan	Edmonton, AB, Canada	2-2	No
(California) Battle Royale With Cheese	Miles Pekala	Oakland, CA	0–2	No
(California) Bite Force	Paul Ventimiglia	Mountain View, CA	8–0	Yes
(New Jersey) Blacksmith	Al Kindle	Edison, NJ	1–4	Yes
(Georgia (U.S. state)) Bombshell	Michael Jeffries	Atlanta, GA	1–5	Yes
(California) Bronco	Reason Bradley & Alexander Rose	Sausalito, CA	5–1	Yes
(Massachusetts) Brutus	Adam Bercu	Somerville, MA	2–3	No
(Florida) Captain Shrederator	Brian Nave	Ormond Beach, FL	1–3	Yes
(Washington (state)) Chomp	Zoe Stephenson	Seattle, WA	1–5	No
(California) Deviled Egg	Zak Hassanein	Vallejo, CA	1-1	No
(Illinois) Double Dutch*	Kevin Lung	Wadsworth, IL	2-2	No
(California) Double Jeopardy	Evan Woolley	Irvine, CA	0–2	Yes
(California) DUCK!	Hal Rucker	Hillsborough, CA	3–2	Yes
(New Zealand) End Game	Jack Barker	Auckland, New Zealand	2–4	Yes
(California) Free Shipping	Gary Gin	Oakland, CA	1–3	Yes
(California) Gamma 9*	Curtis Nemeth	Westminster, CA	0–2	No
(California) Gemini	Ace Shelander	Santa Monica, CA	2–3	Yes
(California) Gigabyte	Brent Rieker	Escondido, CA	2–3	Yes
(Connecticut) HUGE	Jonathan Schultz	South Windsor, CT	3–2	Yes
(Florida) HyperShock	Will Bales	Miami, FL	1–4	Yes
(Texas) Hypothermia	Michael "Fuzzy" Mauldin	Liberty Hill, TX	1–3	No
(California) Icewave	Marc DeVidts	Burlingame, CA	3–2	No
(Florida) Kraken	Matt Spurk	Titusville, FL	1–4	Yes
(California) Lock-Jaw	Donald Hudson	San Diego, CA	6–3	Yes
(Canada) Lucky	Mark Demers	Ottawa, ON, Canada	2–4	Yes
(California) Mecha Rampage	Christian Carlberg	San Luis Obispo, CA	2-2	No

Robot	Builder(s)	Hometown	Fight Record	Returned for Season 9
(Brazil) Minotaur	Marco Antonio Meggiolaro	Rio de Janeiro, Brazil	6–2	Yes
(Florida) Mohawk	Maxwell Bales	Miami, FL	0–3	No
(United Kingdom) Monsoon	Tom Brewster	Turvey, United Kingdom	4–2	Yes
(Massachusetts) Overhaul	Charles Guan	Cambridge, MA	1–4	No
(United Kingdom) Parallax*	Luke Bittenbinder	Northampton, United Kingdom	0–2	No
(Netherlands) Petunia	Mischa de Graaf	Anna Paulowna, The Netherlands	3–2	Yes
(North Carolina) Predator*	Craig Danby	Knightdale, NC	1–2	No
(Netherlands) Reality	Tim Bouwens	Tilburg, The Netherlands	3–2	No
(Utah) Red Devil	Ravi Baboolal	Spanish Fork, UT	2–3	No
(Florida) ROTATOR	Victor Soto	Doral, FL	4–2	Yes
(Massachusetts) SawBlaze	Jamison Go	Cambridge, MA	4–2	Yes
(California) Sharkoprion	Edward D. Robinson	Poway, CA	2–1	Yes
(California) Skorpios	Orion Beach	Santa Rosa, CA	3–1	Yes
(Wisconsin) Son of Whyachi	Luke Ewert	Dorchester, WI	3–2	Yes
(Pennsylvania) SubZero	Jerry Clarkin	Malvern, PA	1–3	Yes
(California) Tantrum	Aren Hill	Mountain View, CA	1–2	Yes
(United Kingdom) The Four Horsemen	Ian Watts	Lewes, United Kingdom	1–3	Yes
(California) Tombstone	Ray Billings	Placerville, CA	5–1	Yes
(Florida) Ultimo Destructo*	Sean Irvin	Valkaria, FL	2-2	No
(Massachusetts) Valkyrie*	Leanne Cushing	Cambridge, MA	4–2	Yes
(United Kingdom) Vanquish	Jack Tweedy	Kent, United Kingdom	0–2	No
(Washington (state)) WAR Hawk	Rob Farrow	Seattle, WA	4–2	Yes
(United Kingdom) Warhead	Simon Scott	Poole, United Kingdom	4–1	No
(Wisconsin) Warrior Dragon	Clint Ewert	Dorchester, WI	1–2	No
(California) Whiplash	Jeff Vasquez	Newbury Park, CA	5–2	Yes
(Florida) Witch Doctor	Andrea Suarez	Miami Springs, FL	3–2	Yes
(Alaska) Yeti	Greg Gibson	Wasilla, AK	3–2	Yes

* - These bots fought unaired fights.

Rank	Bots	Fight Record
1	Lock Jaw	4-2
2	Bite Force, Bronco, HUGE, SawBlaze	3-0
3	Skorpios, Tombstone, Whiplash	2-0
4	Brutus, Double Dutch, DUCK!, End Game, Icewave, Monsoon, Petunia, Red Devil, ROTATOR, Son of Whyachi, Ultimo Destructo, Yeti	2-1
5	Valkyrie	2-2
6	Lucky	2-3
7	Tantrum, Warhead	1-0
8	Basilisk, Deviled Egg, Gemini, Minotaur, Overhaul, Sharkoprion, The Four Horsemen, WAR Hawk, Warrior Dragon, Witch Doctor	1-1
9	Axe Backwards, Blacksmith, Free Shipping, Gigabyte, HyperShock, Mecha Rampage, SubZero	1-2
10	Vanquish	0-1
11	Bale Spear, Battle Royale With Cheese, Double Jeopardy, Gamma 9, Mohawk, Parallax, Predator, Reality	0-2
12	Bombshell, Captain Shrederator, Chomp, Hypothermia, Kraken	0-3

== Tournament ==
This season featured a new fight format with the mid-season (episode 11) "Desperado Tournament" where eight bots whose season started poorly will have a one time opportunity to reverse their fortunes. Eight teams will get a second chance to battle it out tournament style in the battle box. The lone survivor who can win three fights in a row will earn an automatic spot into the Top 16 and will be the first entrance into the 2018 BattleBot Championship and also win the Desperado Tournament giant bolt trophy. Meanwhile, the losing bots will go back into the Battle Box to finish out the season.

=== Seeding ===
1. Lock-Jaw (1–2)
2. Gigabyte (0–1)
3. Lucky (0–2)
4. Valkyrie (1-1)
5. Hypothermia (0–2)
6. Gemini (1–0)
7. Double Dutch (2–0)
8. Kraken (0–2)

=== Desperado Tournament Bracket ===
Desperado Tournament Bracket

Quarter-finals
#1 Lock-Jaw	KO^{[x]}
#8 Kraken
#4 Valkyrie	UD^{[y]}
#5 Hypothermia
#3 Lucky	UD^{[y]}
#6 Gemini
#2 Gigabyte	KO^{[x]}
#7 Double Dutch

Semi-finals
#1 Lock-Jaw	KO^{[x]}
#4 Valkyrie
#3 Lucky	KO^{[x]}
#2 Gigabyte

Final
#1 Lock-Jaw	KO^{[x]}
#3 Lucky

^{x} KO: Knockout
^{y} UD: Unanimous Decision

This season will have a 16 bot tournament to decide who will get the giant nut. The winner of the Desperado Tournament, Lock-Jaw, has already clinched a spot in the tournament. Then a committee will choose the other 15 bots.

==== Desperado Quarterfinals ====
Episode	Battle	Winner	Loser	Method	Time
11 (August 3, 2018)	1	Lucky	Gemini	SD^{[y]}	3:00
11 (August 3, 2018)	2	Lock-Jaw	Kraken	KO^{[x]}	2:25
11 (August 3, 2018)	3	Gigabyte	Double Dutch	KO^{[x]}	1:29
11 (August 3, 2018)	4	Valkyrie	Hypothermia	UD^{[y]}	3:00

The robot was the winner of the battle and moved on to the Semifinals.
The robot was the loser of the battle and was eliminated.
Only highlights from the battle(s) were shown.

^{x} KO: Knockout
^{y} SD: Split Decision

==== Desperado Semifinals ====
Episode	Battle	Winner	Loser	Method	Time
11 (August 3, 2018)	1	Lock-Jaw	Valkyrie	KO^{[x]}	1:32
11 (August 3, 2018)	2	Lucky	Gigabyte	KO^{[x]}	1:07

The robot was the winner of the battle and moved on to the Final.
The robot was the loser of the battle and was eliminated.

^{x} KO: Knockout

==== Desperado Final ====
Episode	Battle	Winner	Loser	Method	Time
11 (August 3, 2018)	1	Lock-Jaw	Lucky	KO^{[x]}	2:46

The robot was the winner of the battle and moved on to the Top 16 Tournament Bracket.
The robot was the loser of the battle and was eliminated.

^{x} KO: Knockout

=== Seeding ===
1. Tombstone (4–0)
2. Bronco (4–0)
3. Bite Force (4–0)
4. Minotaur (3–1)
5. SawBlaze (3–1)
6. Icewave (3–1)
7. Yeti (3–1)
8. Son of Whyachi (3–1)
9. Lock Jaw (4–2)
10. Whiplash (3–1)
11. ROTATOR (3–1)
12. Monsoon (3–1)
13. Witch Doctor (3–1)
14. HUGE (3–1)
15. WAR Hawk (4–1)
16. Bombshell (0–4)

=== Top 16 Bracket ===
Top 16 Bracket

Round of 16
#1 Tombstone
#16 Bombshell	KO^{[x]}
#8 Son of Whyachi
#9 Lock-Jaw	UD^{[y]}
#5 SawBlaze
#12 Monsoon	UD^{[y]}
#4 Minotaur	KO^{[x]}
#13 Witch Doctor
#2 Bronco	KO^{[x]}
#15 WAR Hawk
#7 Yeti
#10 Whiplash	UD^{[y]}
#6 Icewave
#11 ROTATOR	UD^{[y]}
#3 Bite Force	KO^{[x]}
#14 HUGE

Quarter-finals
#16 Bombshell
#9 Lock-Jaw	KO^{[x]}
#12 Monsoon
#4 Minotaur	KO^{[x]}
#2 Bronco
#10 Whiplash	KO^{[x]}
#11 ROTATOR
#3 Bite Force	KO^{[x]}

Semi-finals
#9 Lock-Jaw
#4 Minotaur	KO^{[x]}
#10 Whiplash
#3 Bite Force	KO^{[x]}

Final
#4 Minotaur
#3 Bite Force	KO^{[x]}

^{x} KO: Knockout
^{y} UD: Unanimous Decision
^{z} SD: Split Decision

==== Round of 16 ====
Episode	Battle	Winner	Loser	Method	Time
18 (September 21, 2018)	1	Monsoon	SawBlaze	UD^{[y]}	3:00
18 (September 21, 2018)	2	Bombshell	Tombstone	KO^{[x]}	1:57
18 (September 21, 2018)	3	Minotaur	Witch Doctor	KO^{[x]}	1:39
18 (September 21, 2018)	4	Lock-Jaw	Son of Whyachi	UD^{[y]}	3:00
19 (September 28, 2018)	1	Bite Force	HUGE	KO^{[x]}	1:37
19 (September 28, 2018)	2	ROTATOR	Icewave	UD^{[y]}	3:00
19 (September 28, 2018)	3	Bronco	WAR Hawk	KO^{[x]}	1:40
19 (September 28, 2018)	4	Whiplash	Yeti	UD^{[y]}	3:00

The robot was the winner of the battle and moved on to the Quarterfinals.
The robot was the loser of the battle and was eliminated.
Only highlights from the battle(s) were shown.

^{x} KO: Knockout
^{y} UD: Unanimous Decision

==== Quarterfinals ====
Episode	Battle	Winner	Loser	Method	Time
18 (September 21, 2018)	1	Lock-Jaw	Bombshell	KO^{[x]}	0:36
18 (September 21, 2018)	2	Minotaur	Monsoon	KO^{[x]}	1:00
19 (September 28, 2018)	1	Bite Force	ROTATOR	KO^{[x]}	1:20
19 (September 28, 2018)	2	Whiplash	Bronco	KO^{[x]}	2:57

The robot was the winner of the battle and moved on to the Semifinals.
The robot was the loser of the battle and was eliminated.

^{x} KO: Knockout

==== Semifinals & Championship ====
Episode	Battle	Winner	Loser	Method	Time
20 (October 5, 2018)
20 (October 5, 2018)	Semifinals				
20 (October 5, 2018)	1	Minotaur	Lock-Jaw	KO^{[x]}	1:43
20 (October 5, 2018)	2	Bite Force	Whiplash	KO^{[x]}	1:32
20 (October 5, 2018)	Exhibition				
20 (October 5, 2018)	1	Tombstone	Tantrum	KO^{[x]}	1:19
20 (October 5, 2018)	Championship				
20 (October 5, 2018)	1	Bite Force	Minotaur	KO^{[x]}	2:05

The robot was the winner of the battle.
The robot was the loser of the battle.
The robot was the winner of the battle and became the champion of BattleBots 2018.

^{x} KO: Knockout

== Episodes ==
No. overall	No. in season	Title	Original release date	U.S. viewers (millions)
111	1	"It's Robot Fighting Time!"	May 11, 2018	1.03
The legendary robots return to go head-to-head in the battle arena to earn a spot in the tournament for the 2018 BattleBots World Championship. Fight Card: Blacksmith vs. Bite Force; Rumble: Mecha Rampage vs. DUCK! vs. Free Shipping; SubZero vs. HUGE; Bombshell vs. Lock-Jaw; Valkyrie vs. Ultimo Destructo (unaired); Rumble: Kraken vs. Sharkoprion vs. Deviled Egg (Science Channel exclusive – Mega Fights: Let the Battle Begin). Main Event: Tombstone vs. Minotaur. The winners were: Bite Force (UD), DUCK! (UD), HUGE (UD), Lock-Jaw (KO, 113 seconds), Ultimo Destructo (KO, 124 seconds), Sharkoprion (KO, 142 seconds), Tombstone (KO, 142 seconds).
112	2	"Are You Yeti to Rumble?"	May 18, 2018	1.02
Ten more robots kick-off their season, all looking to earn an invitation into the post-season tournament where they will crown the 2018 World Champion. Fight Card: Icewave vs. Vanquish; ROTATOR vs. Petunia; Red Devil vs. Brutus; Captain Shrederator vs. End Game. Main Event: Witch Doctor vs. Yeti. The winners were: Icewave (KO, 56 seconds), Petunia (UD), Red Devil (KO, 144 seconds), End Game (KO, 82 seconds), Yeti (KO, 84 seconds).
113	3	"Everyone Wants to Be the Hotshot"	May 25, 2018	0.94
Seven rookie robots try to impress the crowd and judges to prove they have what it takes in the Battle Box. Meanwhile, veteran bots face off with each other. Fight Card: Overhaul vs. SawBlaze; Whiplash vs. Hypothermia; Rumble: The Four Horsemen vs. Double Jeopardy vs. Gamma 9; WAR Hawk vs. Axe Backwards. Main Event: HyperShock vs. Bite Force. The winners were: SawBlaze (KO, 94 seconds), Whiplash (KO, 87 seconds), The Four Horsemen (UD), WAR Hawk (KO, 90 seconds), Bite Force (KO, 36 seconds).
114	4	"There's No Tapping Out in BattleBots!"	June 1, 2018	1.01
Reigning champion Tombstone takes on the legendary Gigabyte as the battles heat up to take home the renowned BattleBots trophy. Fight Card: Red Devil vs. Monsoon; Lucky vs. Skorpios; Battle Royale With Cheese vs. Tantrum; End Game vs. Lock-Jaw; Predator vs. ROTATOR (unaired); Rumble: Gemini vs. Mohawk vs. Kraken (Science Channel exclusive – Mega Fights: Do the Fight Thing); Parallax & Bale Spear vs. Basilisk & Double Dutch (unaired). Main Event: Gigabyte vs. Tombstone. The winners were: Monsoon (UD), Skorpios (UD), Tantrum (UD), End Game (KO, 121 seconds), ROTATOR (KO, 67 seconds), Gemini (KO, 163 seconds), Basilisk & Double Dutch (UD), Tombstone (KO, 69 seconds).
115	5	"Just Keep Spinning"	June 8, 2018	0.96
A brutal match-up between Icewave and Yeti ignites the Battle Box, while the best bots in the world flex their gears. Fight Card: HUGE vs. Free Shipping; Hypothermia vs. Minotaur; Blacksmith vs. The Four Horsemen; Son of Whyachi vs. Brutus. Main Event: Yeti vs. Icewave. The winners were: HUGE (UD), Minotaur (UD), Blacksmith (KO, 175 seconds), Brutus (KO, 41 seconds), Icewave (KO, 36 seconds).
116	6	"It's a Flippin' Robot Party!"	June 15, 2018	1.00
World-class robots Bronco and Bombshell go head-to-head as the elite group of robots compete for the title of 2018 BattleBots World Champion. Fight Card: SawBlaze vs. Reality; Petunia vs. Monsoon; SubZero vs. Captain Shrederator; Chomp vs. Warrior Dragon; Parallax vs. Ultimo Destructo (unaired), Rumble: Valkyrie vs. Bale Spear vs. Predator (Science Channel exclusive – Mega Fights: Robot Rodeo). Main Event: Bronco vs. Bombshell. The winners were: SawBlaze (UD), Monsoon (KO, 120 seconds), SubZero (KO, 112 seconds), Warrior Dragon (UD), Ultimo Destructo (UD), Valkyrie (KO,114 seconds), Bronco (KO, 79 seconds).
117	7	"It's Fork Lifting Time!"	June 22, 2018	0.92
Rookie bot End Game and former BattleBots champ Bite Force duke it out in an action-packed night of battles. Fight Card: Lucky vs. Son of Whyachi; SawBlaze vs. Mohawk; Mecha Rampage vs. Whiplash; Chomp vs. Overhaul; Rumble: Basilisk vs. Deviled Egg vs. Axe Backwards (Science Channel exclusive – Mega Fights: Jaws of Death). Main Event: End Game vs. Bite Force. The winners were: Son of Whyachi (KO, 94 seconds), SawBlaze (KO, 127 seconds), Whiplash (KO, 52 seconds), Overhaul (UD), Deviled Egg (UD), Bite Force (KO, 62 seconds).
118	8	"I'm Here to Kick Some Bot"	June 29, 2018	0.93
BattleBots royalty Bronco and Lock-Jaw fight to the death as the competition for 2018 BattleBots World Champion gets fierce. Fight Card: ROTATOR vs. Warrior Dragon; Reality vs. DUCK!; HyperShock vs. Battle Royale With Cheese; Blacksmith vs. Witch Doctor; Double Dutch vs. Gamma 9 (unaired). Main Event: Bronco vs. Lock-Jaw. The winners were: ROTATOR (UD), DUCK! (KO, 110 seconds), HyperShock (KO, 50 seconds), Witch Doctor (UD), Double Dutch (KO, 124 seconds), Bronco (UD).
119	9	"Ice, Ice, Baby"	July 6, 2018	0.84
Elite bots Icewave and Skorpios square off in an epic throw down, and the rest of the bots battle to secure their spots in the Sweet 16. Fight Card: Chomp vs. HUGE; Brutus vs. WAR Hawk; Captain Shrederator vs. Petunia; Yeti vs. Bombshell; Mecha Rampage vs. Double Jeopardy (Science Channel exclusive – Mega Fights: King of the Kill). Main Event: Skorpios vs. Icewave. The winners were: HUGE (UD), Brutus (KO, 153 seconds), Petunia (KO, 76 seconds), Yeti (UD), Mecha Rampage (KO, 56 seconds), Skorpios (SD).
120	10	"A Smashing Good Time"	July 13, 2018	0.90
Undefeated bots Bronco and DUCK! duke it out in the Battle Box as the race to become BattleBots World Champion heats up. Fight Card: HyperShock vs. Free Shipping; Red Devil vs. SubZero; Sharkoprion vs. Warhead; Monsoon vs. Son of Whyachi; Ultimo Destructo vs. Axe Backwards (Science Channel exclusive – Mega Fights: Clash of the Titans). Main Event: Bronco vs. DUCK!. The winners were: Free Shipping (KO, 146 seconds), Red Devil (UD), Warhead (UD), Son of Whyachi (KO, 54 seconds), Axe Backwards (KO, 135 seconds), Bronco (KO, 135 seconds).
121	11	"The Desperado Tournament"	August 3, 2018	0.72
In a last-chance tournament, eight bots battle it out for one of the last spots in the 2018 World Championship Sweet 16. Fight Card: Quarter-finals: Lucky vs. Gemini; Lock-Jaw vs. Kraken; Gigabyte vs. Double Dutch; Valkyrie vs. Hypothermia. Semi-finals: Lock-Jaw vs. Valkyrie; Lucky vs. Gigabyte. Finals: Lock-Jaw vs. Lucky. The qualifying winners were: Lucky (UD), Lock-Jaw (KO, 145 seconds), Gigabyte (KO, 89 seconds), Valkyrie (UD); Semi-final winners: Lock-Jaw (KO, 92 seconds) and Lucky (KO, 67 seconds); Tournament winner: Lock-Jaw (KO, 162 seconds).
122	12	"This Is BattleBots!"	August 10, 2018	0.74
Reigning BattleBots champion Tombstone and newcomer Whiplash fight to the finish as an advanced group of bots go head-to-head in the Battle Box. Fight Card: ROTATOR vs. Skorpios; Ultimo Destructo vs. Witch Doctor; WAR Hawk vs. Overhaul; Chomp vs. Warhead; Sharkoprion vs. Gemini (Science Channel exclusive – Mega Fights: Coming for the King). Main Event: Tombstone vs. Whiplash. The winners were: ROTATOR (UD), Witch Doctor (KO), WAR Hawk (UD), Warhead (UD), Sharkoprion (SD), Tombstone (KO).
123	13	"The Rematch"	August 17, 2018	0.83
Minotaur continues its quest for the BattleBots title in an epic fight with Blacksmith, a rematch two years in the making. Fight Card: Red Devil vs. Valkyrie; Brutus vs. Gigabyte; Bombshell vs. Bite Force; End Game vs. Son of Whyachi; Lucky vs. Reality (Science Channel exclusive – Mega Fights: Fight of the Century). Main Event: Minotaur vs. Blacksmith. The winners were: Valkyrie (UD), Gigabyte (KO), Bite Force (KO, 49 seconds), Son of Whyachi (KO, 43 seconds), Reality (KO), Minotaur (UD).
124	14	"It's Going to Be a Flippin' Blast!"	August 24, 2018	0.84
Undefeated bots Bronco and SawBlaze battle to the death to preserve their perfect records in a night of epic clashes. Fight Card: Tombstone vs. DUCK!; Petunia vs. Yeti; Axe Backwards vs. Monsoon; Warhead vs. Warrior Dragon; Mecha Rampage vs. Tantrum (Science Channel exclusive - Mega Fights: Undefeated Showdown). Main Event: Bronco vs. SawBlaze. The winners were: Tombstone (KO), Yeti (KO), Monsoon (KO), Warhead (SD), Mecha Rampage (KO), Bronco (UD).
125	15	"USA vs. the World"	August 31, 2018	0.76
From the field of 55, ten teams put their championship quests on hold in a special tournament. BattleBots from the United States take on BattleBots from around the world (Australia, Brazil, Canada, Netherlands, Great Britain and New Zealand) in an international showdown of combat robotics. Fight Card: (United States) Blacksmith vs. (United Kingdom) Warhead; (United States) Captain Shrederator vs. (United Kingdom) Vanquish; (United States) Kraken vs. (Canada) Red Devil; (United States) HyperShock vs. (Netherlands) Reality. Main Event: (United States) SawBlaze vs. (New Zealand) End Game. The winners were: Warhead (SD), Captain Shrederator (KO), Kraken (UD), Reality (KO), SawBlaze (SD). Final Score: United States 3 – World 2
126	16	"A Bull in a Bot Shop"	September 7, 2018	1.03
Minotaur goes head-to-head with SubZero in an ultimate smackdown as the two bots try and secure their spots in the World Championship. Fight Card: Whiplash vs. Warhead; Mohawk vs. Reality; Free Shipping vs. WAR Hawk; Witch Doctor vs. Overhaul. Main Event: SubZero vs. Minotaur. The winners were: Whiplash (KO), Reality (KO), WAR Hawk (UD), Witch Doctor (KO), Minotaur (KO).
127	17	"Last Chance Rumble"	September 14, 2018	0.83
Brutus, WAR Hawk and End Game fight for a guaranteed spot, as the last round of bots put everything on the line to make it into the Sweet 16 round. Fight Card: Icewave vs. HUGE; HyperShock vs. Skorpios; Gemini vs. The Four Horsemen; Last Chance Rumble: Brutus vs. WAR Hawk vs. End Game. Main Event: (6-Bot Rumble): Lucky vs. Bombshell vs. Valkyrie vs. DUCK! vs. Red Devil vs. Gigabyte. The winners were: Icewave (KO), Skorpios (SD), Gemini (UD), WAR Hawk (double KO), Bombshell (UD).
128	18	"It's Tournament Time"	September 21, 2018	0.98
The Sweet 16 round kicks off with fights featuring Tombstone, Minotaur and Lock-Jaw, as the elite bots begin the battle to become the 2018 BattleBots World Champion. Fight Card: #5 SawBlaze vs. #12 Monsoon; #1 Tombstone vs. #16 Bombshell; #4 Minotaur vs. #13 Witch Doctor; #8 Son of Whyachi vs. #9 Lock-Jaw. Quarterfinals: #9 Lock-Jaw vs. #16 Bombshell; #4 Minotaur vs. #12 Monsoon. The winners were: #12 Monsoon (UD), #16 Bombshell (KO, 117 seconds), #4 Minotaur (KO, 99 seconds), #9 Lock-Jaw (UD). Quarterfinals: #9 Lock-Jaw (KO, 36 seconds), #4 Minotaur (KO, 60 seconds).
129	19	"The Tournament"	September 28, 2018	0.76
The tournament continues with an epic night of smackdowns and legendary upsets as eight world-class bots go head-to-head to earn a place in the final four of the BattleBots World Championship. Fight Card: #3 Bite Force vs. #14 HUGE; #6 Ice Wave vs. #11 ROTATOR; #2 Bronco vs. #15. WAR Hawk; #7 Yeti vs. #10 Whiplash. Quarterfinals: #3 Bite Force vs. #11 ROTATOR; #2 Bronco vs. #10 Whiplash The winners were: #3 Bite Force (KO, 97 seconds), #11 ROTATOR (UD), #2 Bronco (KO, 104 seconds), #10 Whiplash (UD). Quarterfinals: #3 Bite Force (KO, 79 seconds), #10 Whiplash (KO, 177 seconds).
130	20	"Championship Night"	October 5, 2018	0.81
It's championship night and just four bots remain to face off in the ultimate battles to decide the 2018 BattleBots World Champion. Fight Card: #4 Minotaur vs. #9 Lock-Jaw; #3 Bite Force vs. #10 Whiplash; Tombstone vs. Tantrum (exhibition). Main Event: #4 Minotaur vs. #3 Bite Force (final). The winners were: #4 Minotaur (KO, 103 seconds), #3 Bite Force (KO, 92 seconds), Tombstone (KO, 79 seconds). 2018 BattleBots World Champion: #3 Bite Force (KO, 125 seconds).

== Giant Bolt Awards ==
Four giant bolt awards were made for the 2018 season. The winner of the Desperado Tournament (episode 11) received a bolt award. The other three "Best of Show" awards were presented in the Battlebox towards the end of filming and were announced by Battlebots on Facebook and Twitter on 16 October 2018.

Award	Awarded for	Winner
Desperado	Winner of Desperado Tournament	Lock-Jaw
Founders' Award	Team that embodies the spirit of BattleBots. Awarded by the BattleBots Founders, Trey Roski and Greg Munson.	Monsoon
Best Design	Robot that best embodies the combination of top-notch engineering and outstanding design Awarded by the BattleBots builders.	Huge
Most Destructive Robot	Robot that dished out the most gourmet damage Awarded by the BattleBots Judges.	Rotator
