= Ginsu (disambiguation) =

Ginsu is a brand of direct-marketed knives.

Ginsu may also refer to:

- "Ginsu", a song by Tritonal
- GINSU, a computer surveillance technology disclosed in the 2010s
- Ginsu, a BattleBots robot
- The Ginsu shark
- The AGM-114R9X missile, known as the "Flying Ginsu"
- "Ginsu guardrails", a design element of the Big Dig criticized as a safety hazard
