= BattleBots season 9 =

BattleBots
- Season 9
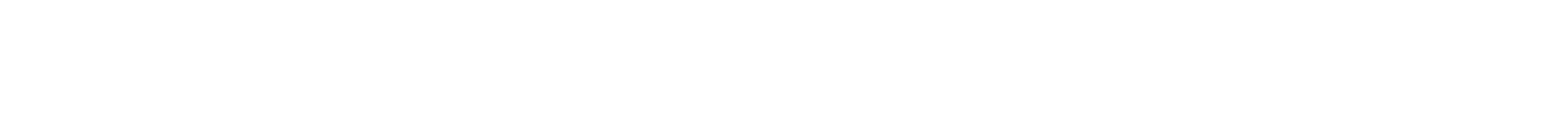
- No. of episodes: 16

Release
- Original network: Discovery; Science
- Original release: June 7 – September 27, 2019

Season chronology
- ← Previous; Season 8 Next → Season 10

The ninth season of the American competitive television series BattleBots premiered on Discovery on June 7, 2019. This is the second season of Battlebots to premiere on Discovery Channel and the fourth season since the show was rebooted in 2015. Encore episodes debuted on Science Channel on June 12, 2019.

MLB/NFL Sportscaster Chris Rose and former UFC fighter Kenny Florian returned from the last three seasons to host this ninth season (and 20th year) of the BattleBots competition on Discovery. Also, Faruq Tauheed returned as the arena announcer. Taking over for Jessica Chobot as the behind the scenes and pit reporter was Jenny Taft.

== Judges ==
This season the judges will score on a 7-point scale: 3 points for damage; 2 points for aggression; and also 2 points for control.

The current judges are former BattleBots contenders, Derek Young, Lisa Winter, and Jason Bardis.

== Contestants ==
This season marked the 20th year of the BattleBots competition. The largest field in the history of the show will feature 68 of the best heavyweight robots (weighing a maximum of 250 pounds) to fight head-to-head in the Battle Arena. Their goal is to earn a top 16 ranking and qualify for the post-season where there will be knockout rounds until a winner-take-all fight to crown the 2019 BattleBots World Champion. (The robot, Electric Ray, entered the BattleBots competition but did not participate after it failed to pass safety tests.)

The contestants hailed from all over the world from nine countries including: Australia, Brazil, Canada, China, the Netherlands, New Zealand, Russia, United Kingdom and the United States.

Contestants

Robot	Builder(s)	Hometown	Fight Record
(Florida) Axe Backwards*	Kurt Durjan	Palm City, FL	0–4
(Kansas) BattleSaw*	Adam Cox	Wichita, KS	0–2
(California) Bite Force	Paul Ventimiglia	Mountain View, CA	8–0
(Brazil) Black Dragon	João Marcos Giacometti Cavalheiro	Itajubá, Minas Gerais, Brazil	4–2
(New Jersey) Blacksmith	Al Kindle	Edison, NJ	3-3
(Massachusetts) Bloodsport	Justin Marple	Somerville, MA	3–1
(Georgia (U.S. state)) Bombshell	Matthew Carroll & Dan Hammer	Atlanta, GA	0–4
(Florida) Breaker Box	Jim Smentowski	Bradenton, FL	1–3
(California) Bronco	Reason Bradley & Alexander Rose	Sausalito, CA	0–4
(Florida) Captain Shrederator	Brian Nave	Ormond Beach, FL	0–4
(California) Chronos*	Jerry Serafin	Canoga Park, CA	1–2
(United Kingdom) Cobalt	Sam Smith	Derby, United Kingdom	2–3
(Colorado) Copperhead	Zach Goff	Loveland, CO	2–3
(California) Daisy Cutter*	Bob Giradi	Huntington Beach, CA	0–1
(Australia) DeathRoll	Steven Martin	Brisbane, Australia	6–1
(Wisconsin) Deep Six*	Dustin Esswein	Newton, WI	2–1
(California) Double Jeopardy*	Evan Woolley	Irvine, CA	0–1
(California) DUCK!	Hal Rucker	Hillsborough, CA	2–3
(Virginia) Electric Ray	Lucas Buermeyer	Herndon, VA	
(New Zealand) End Game	Jack Barker	Auckland, New Zealand	2–3
(Florida) Extinguisher*	John Flaacke IV	Tampa, FL	1–2
(Wisconsin) Falcon*	Clint Ewert	Dorchester, WI	1–2
(United Kingdom) The Four Horsemen*	Ian Watts	Brighton, United Kingdom	1-1
(North Carolina) Foxtrot*	Craig Danby	Raleigh, NC	0–2
(California) Free Shipping	Gary Gin	Oakland, CA	2-2
(California) Gemini*	Ace Shelander	Santa Monica, CA	1–2
(California) Gigabyte	Brent Rieker	Escondido, CA	2-2
(Florida) Gruff	Sam McAmis	Holiday, FL	1–3
(Connecticut) HUGE	Jonathan Schultz	South Windsor, CT	4–2
(Wisconsin) Hydra	Jake Ewert	Dorchester, WI	4–1
(Florida) HyperShock	Will Bales	Miami, FL	3–2
(United Kingdom) Jasper*	Tom Lloyd	London, United Kingdom	0–2
(California) Kingpin*	Kevin Hjelden	Sacramento, CA	1-1
(Florida) Kraken*	Matt Spurk	Titusville, FL	1–2
(California) Lock-Jaw	Donald Hutson	San Diego, CA	5–2
(Canada) Lucky*	Mark Demers	Ottawa, ON, Canada	1–2

Robot	Builder(s)	Hometown	Fight Record
(California) MadCatter*	Martin Mason	Pomona, CA	1–2
(Maryland) Mammoth*	Ricky Willems	Baltimore, MD	3-3
(California) Marvin*	Hannah Rucker	Hillsborough, CA	1–3
(Brazil) Minotaur	Marco Antonio Meggiolaro	Rio de Janeiro, Brazil	5–4
(United Kingdom) Monsoon	Tom Brewster	Turvey, United Kingdom	2–3
(United Kingdom) Nelly the Ellybot*	Sarah Malyan	Derby, United Kingdom	0–2
(South Carolina) P1*	Luke Bittenbinder	Clemson, SC	0–2
(Netherlands) Petunia*	Mischa de Graaf	Anna Paulowna, The Netherlands	1–2
(United Kingdom) Quantum	James Cooper	Birmingham, United Kingdom	3-3
(United Kingdom) Ragnarök*	Tim Rackley	Kent, Isle of Sheppy, United Kingdom	1–3
(China) RailGun Max	Elaine Wu	Shanghai, China	3–2
(Russia) Rainbow*	Petr Kravchenko	Saint-Petersburg, Russia	2–1
(Massachusetts) Ribbot	David Jin	Worcester, MA	3–2
(Florida) Rotator	Victor Soto	Doral, FL	2–3
(Massachusetts) SawBlaze	Jamison Go	Cambridge, MA	4–2
(California) Sharkoprion*	Edward D. Robinson	Poway, CA	0–1
(New York (state)) Shatter!*	Adam Wrigley	Brooklyn, NY	3–2
(California) Shellshock*	George Kirkman	Rolling Hills Estates, CA	0–1
(Utah) Sidewinder*	Josh Coates	Salt Lake City, UT	1-1
(California) Skorpios	Orion Beach	Santa Rosa, CA	3–2
(Wisconsin) Son of Whyachi	Luke Ewert	Dorchester, WI	4–2
(Pennsylvania) SubZero*	Jerry Clarkin	Malvern, PA	1–2
(California) Tantrum*	Aren Hill	Mountain View, CA	2-2
Texas Twister	Michael "Fuzzy" Mauldin	Liberty Hill, TX	2-2
(California) Tombstone	Ray Billings	Placerville, CA	5–2
(Massachusetts) Uppercut*	Alex Hattori	Cambridge, MA	5–3
(Massachusetts) Valkyrie*	Leanne Cushing	Cambridge, MA	2-2
(China) WanHoo	Weidong Qi	Shanghai, China	2-2
(Washington (state)) WAR Hawk	Rob Farrow	Seattle, WA	2–3
(California) Whiplash	Jeff Vasquez	Newbury Park, CA	4–2
(Florida) Witch Doctor	Andrea Gellatly (née Suarez)	Miami Springs, FL	7–1
(Alaska) Yeti	Greg Gibson	Wasilla, AK	4–2

* These bots participated in fights that were untelevised.

== Desperado Tournament ==
Like the previous season, this season also featured the mid-season "Desperado Tournament", where eight bots who started the regular competition with a poor record had the opportunity regain their winning ways and get a second chance to battle it out tournament style in the battle box. The bot that won three fights in a row earned an automatic spot into the Top 16 and was the first entrant into the 2019 BattleBots Championship, and they also won the Desperado Tournament giant bolt trophy. The losing bots went back into the regular rotation to finish out their season.

=== Seeding ===
1. Minotaur (0–2)
2. WAR Hawk (1-1)
3. Black Dragon (1-1)
4. End Game (0–2)
5. Gruff (1-1)
6. Captain Shrederator (0–2)
7. Ragnorök (0–2)
8. Lucky (1-1)

=== Desperado Tournament Bracket ===
Desperado Tournament Bracket

Quarter-finals
#1 Minotaur	KO^{[x]}
#8 Lucky
#4 End Game	KO^{[x]}
#5 Gruff
#3 Black Dragon	KO^{[x]}
#6 Captain Shrederator
#2 WAR Hawk	KO^{[x]}
#7 Ragnarök

Semi-finals
#1 Minotaur	KO^{[x]}
#4 End Game
#3 Black Dragon	KO^{[x]}
#2 WAR Hawk

Final
#1 Minotaur
#3 Black Dragon	UD^{[y]}

^{x} KO: Knockout
^{y} UD: Unanimous Decision

==== Desperado Tournament Quarterfinals ====
Episode	Battle	Winner	Loser	Method	Time
8 (July 26, 2019)	1	Minotaur	Lucky	KO^{[x]}	1:59
8 (July 26, 2019)	2	End Game	Gruff	KO^{[x]}	2:59
8 (July 26, 2019)	3	Black Dragon	Captain Shrederator	KO^{[x]}	1:18
8 (July 26, 2019)	4	WAR Hawk	Ragnarök	KO^{[x]}	2:45

The robot was the winner of the battle and moved on to the Semifinals.
The robot was the loser of the battle and was eliminated.

^{x} KO: Knockout

==== Desperado Tournament Semifinals ====
Episode	Battle	Winner	Loser	Method	Time
8 (July 26, 2019)	1	Minotaur	End Game	KO^{[x]}	2:36
8 (July 26, 2019)	2	Black Dragon	WAR Hawk	KO^{[x]}	1:01

The robot was the winner of the battle and moved on to the Final.
The robot was the loser of the battle and was eliminated.

^{x} KO: Knockout

==== Desperado Tournament Final ====
Episode	Battle	Winner	Loser	Method	Time
8 (July 26, 2019)	1	Black Dragon	Minotaur	UD^{[y]}	3:00

The robot was the winner of the battle and moved on to the Top 16 Tournament Bracket.
The robot was the loser of the battle and was eliminated.

^{y} UD: Unanimous Decision

== Top 16 Tournament ==
=== Seeding ===
1. Bite Force (4-0)
2. Witch Doctor (4-0)
3. Hydra (4-0)
4. Tombstone (3-1)
5. Whiplash (3-1)
6. DeathRoll (4-0)
7. SawBlaze (3-1)
8. Black Dragon (4-1)
9. Lock-Jaw (4-1)
10. Son of Whyachi (4-1)
11. Yeti (4-1)
12. HUGE (4-1)
13. Quantum (3-2)
14. Minotaur (4-3)
15. Blacksmith (3-2)
16. Uppercut (4-1)

=== Top 16 Tournament Bracket ===
Top 16 Bracket

Round of 16
#1 Bite Force	KO ^{[x]}
#16 Uppercut
#8 Black Dragon
#9 Lock-Jaw	SD ^{[z]}
#5 Whiplash	SD ^{[z]}
#12 HUGE
#4 Tombstone	KO ^{[x]}
#13 Quantum
#2 Witch Doctor	KO ^{[x]}
#15 Blacksmith
#7 SawBlaze	UD ^{[y]}
#10 Son of Whyachi
#3 Hydra
#14 Minotaur	KO ^{[x]}
#6 DeathRoll	KO ^{[x]}
#11 Yeti

Quarter-finals
#1 Bite Force	KO ^{[x]}
#9 Lock-Jaw
#5 Whiplash
#4 Tombstone	KO ^{[x]}
#2 Witch Doctor	KO ^{[x]}
#7 SawBlaze
#14 Minotaur	^{[x]}
#6 DeathRoll	KO ^{[x]}

Semi-finals
#1 Bite Force	KO ^{[x]}
#4 Tombstone
#2 Witch Doctor	SD ^{[z]}
#6 DeathRoll

Final
#1 Bite Force	KO ^{[x]}
#2 Witch Doctor

^{x} KO: Knockout
^{y} UD: Unanimous Decision
^{z} SD: Split Decision

==== Round of 16 ====
Episode	Battle	Winner	Loser	Method	Time
15 (September 20, 2019)	1	SawBlaze	Son of Whyachi	UD^{[y]}	3:00
15 (September 20, 2019)	2	Bite Force	Uppercut	KO^{[x]}	0:57
15 (September 20, 2019)	3	DeathRoll	Yeti	KO^{[x]}	1:26
15 (September 20, 2019)	4	Tombstone	Quantum	KO^{[y]}	0:32
15 (September 20, 2019)	5	Whiplash	HUGE	SD^{[z]}	3:00
15 (September 20, 2019)	6	Witch Doctor	Blacksmith	KO^{[x]}	2:24
15 (September 20, 2019)	7	Lock-Jaw	Black Dragon	SD^{[z]}	3:00
15 (September 20, 2019)	8	Minotaur	Hydra	KO^{[x]}	0:42

The robot was the winner of the battle and moved on to the Quarterfinals.
The robot was the loser of the battle and was eliminated.

^{x} KO: Knockout
^{y} UD: Unanimous Decision
^{z} SD: Split Decision

==== Quarterfinals ====
Episode	Battle	Winner	Loser	Method	Time
16 (September 27, 2019)	1	DeathRoll	Minotaur	KO^{[x]}	2:04
16 (September 27, 2019)	2	Tombstone	Whiplash	KO^{[x]}	1:40
16 (September 27, 2019)	3	Witch Doctor	SawBlaze	KO^{[x]}	1:20
16 (September 27, 2019)	4	Bite Force	Lock-Jaw	KO^{[x]}	2:56

The robot was the winner of the battle and moved on to the Semifinals.
The robot was the loser of the battle and was eliminated.

^{x} KO: Knockout

==== Semi-finals ====
Episode	Battle	Winner	Loser	Method	Time
16 (September 27, 2019)	1	Witch Doctor	DeathRoll	SD^{[z]}	3:00
16 (September 27, 2019)	2	Bite Force	Tombstone	KO^{[x]}	0:52

The robot was the winner of the battle.
The robot was the loser of the battle.

^{x} KO: Knockout
^{z} SD: Split Decision

==== 2019 World Championship ====
Episode	Battle	Winner	Loser	Method	Time
16 (September 27, 2019)	1	Bite Force	Witch Doctor	KO^{[x]}	1:56

The robot was the winner of the battle and became the champion of BattleBots 2019.

^{x} KO: Knockout

== Standings ==
As of Episode 13:

Current Scoreboard:
Team Name	Total matches	Wins	Losses	Knockouts	Losses by knockout
Axe Backwards (2019)	4	0	4	0	3
BattleSaw (2019)	2	0	2	0	2
Bite Force (2019)	8	8	0	6	0
Black Dragon (2019)	6	4	2	3	0
Blacksmith (2019)	6	3	3	1	1
Bloodsport (2019)	3	2	1	1	1
Bombshell (2019)	4	0	4	0	4
Breaker Box (2019)	4	1	3	0	3
Bronco (2019)	4	0	4	0	2
Captain Shrederator (2019)	4	0	4	0	4
Chronos (2019)	2	1	1	1	1
Cobalt (2019)	4	2	2	2	2
Copperhead (2019)	4	2	2	1	3
Daisy Cutter (2019)	1	0	1	0	1
DeathRoll (2019)	7	6	1	5	0
Deep Six (2019)	3	2	1	1	1
Double Jeopardy (2019)	1	0	1	0	0
DUCK! (2019)	5	2	3	2	0
Electric Ray (2019)	0	0	0	0	0
End Game (2019)	5	2	3	2	3
Extinguisher (2019)	2	1	1	1	0
Falcon (2019)	3	1	2	0	1
The Four Horsemen (2019)	3	2	1	1	0
Foxtrot (2019)	2	0	2	0	2
Free Shipping (2019)	4	2	2	1	1
Gemini (2019)	3	1	2	1	0
Gigabyte (2019)	4	2	2	1	1
Gruff (2019)	4	1	3	0	1
HUGE (2019)	6	4	2	2	1
Hydra (2019)	5	4	1	4	1
HyperShock (2019)	5	3	2	3	1
Jasper (2019)	2	0	2	0	2
Kingpin (2019)	2	1	1	1	1
Kraken (2019)	3	1	2	0	1
Lock Jaw (2019)	7	5	2	3	2
Lucky (2019)	3	1	2	0	1
MadCatter (2019)	2	1	1	1	1
Mammoth (2019)	5	2	3	2	2
Marvin (2019)	4	1	3	0	0
Minotaur (2019)	9	5	4	4	1
Monsoon (2019)	4	1	3	1	2
Nelly the Ellybot (2019)	2	0	2	0	1
Nightmare (2019)	0	0	0	0	0
P1 (2019)	2	0	2	0	2
Petunia (2019)	3	1	2	0	2
Quantum (2019)	6	3	3	1	3
Ragnarök (2019)	3	0	3	0	3
RailGun Max (2019)	4	3	1	2	1
Rainbow (2019)	3	2	1	1	1
Ribbot (2019)	4	2	2	2	0
Rotator (2019)	5	2	3	2	0
SawBlaze (2019)	6	4	2	0	2
Sharkoprion (2019)	0	0	0	0	0
Shatter! (2019)	4	2	2	1	1
Shellshock (2019)	1	0	1	0	1
Sidewinder (2019)	2	1	1	1	1
Skorpios (2019)	5	3	2	2	2
Son of Whyachi (2019)	6	4	2	4	1
SubZero (2019)	3	1	2	1	2
Tantrum (2019)	4	2	2	1	1
Texas Twister (2019)	4	2	2	1	2
Tombstone (2019)	4	3	1	4	2
Uppercut (2019)	6	4	2	4	2
Valkyrie (2019)	4	2	2	1	2
WanHoo (2019)	4	2	2	1	0
WAR Hawk (2019)	5	2	3	2	3
Whiplash (2019)	6	4	2	2	1
Witch Doctor (2019)	8	7	1	4	1
Yeti (2019)	6	4	2	2	1

== Episodes ==
No. overall	No. in season	Title	Original release date	U.S. viewers (millions)
131	1	"Let the Bot Battles Begin! (part 1)/That's What You Call a KO! (part 2)"	May 31, 2019 (online); June 7, 2019 (Discovery Channel)	0.741
BattleBots: Fight Night is back with the largest, hungriest, and deadliest field ever assembled! The 2019 regular season kicks off as 68 teams representing 9 different countries begin their quest for the ultimate world championship. Tonight, the most feared robot in the world, Tombstone and builder Ray Billings, faces off against the most decorated builder in the sport, Donald Hutson and Lock-Jaw. Sparks will fly, metal will fly, and a whole lot of robots will die! Fight Card: SawBlaze vs. Rotator; Cobalt vs. SubZero; Kraken vs. Ribbot; DeathRoll vs. End Game; HyperShock vs. Valkyrie; Blacksmith vs. Quantum; Rumble: Marvin vs. Gruff vs. Gemini (Science Channel exclusive – Mega Fights: Battle of the Beasts); Main Event: Tombstone vs. Lock-Jaw. The winners were SawBlaze (3-0 UD), Cobalt (KO), Kraken (3-0 UD), DeathRoll (KO), HyperShock (KO), Quantum (3-0 UD), Gruff (3-0 UD), and Tombstone (KO)
132	2	"You Mess with the Bull, You Get the Drum"	June 14, 2019	0.849
The already-terrifying field of destruction grows as 14 more bots make their debuts in this 2019 campaign. Minotaur starts its hopeful march back to the finals as it takes on driving phenom Matty Vasquez and Whiplash. DUCK! looks to avenge its controversial 2018 loss to Bombshell in explosive fashion, and the biggest bot EVER enters The BattleBox as Mammoth moves to add Axe Backwards to the extinction list. Fight Card: Son of Whyachi vs. HUGE; Texas Twister vs. Black Dragon; DUCK! vs. Bombshell; Shatter! vs. Witch Doctor; Axe Backwards vs. Mammoth; WanHoo vs. Captain Shrederator; Chronos vs. Gigabyte (Science Channel exclusive – Mega Fights: The Monster's Lair). Main Event: Whiplash vs. Minotaur The winners were Son of Whyachi (KO); Texas Twister (2-1 SD); DUCK! (KO); Witch Doctor (3-0 UD); Mammoth (KO); WanHoo (KO); Gigabyte (KO); and Whiplash (3-0 UD)
133	3	"Don't FLIP OUT!"	June 21, 2019	0.842
The 2019 season rages on with a full fight card of robots primed for ultimate destruction. Two former teammates meet inside the box as Ragnarök tries to drop the hammer on Monsoon. Free Shipping might flip out taking on Hydra, a whole new breed of robot. Legendary builder Jim Smentowski returns to the BattleBox with a new bot that will haunt your dreams, Breaker Box. And in the main event, returning champion Bite Force looks to add a Yeti to its trophy collection. Fight Card: Skorpios vs. Copperhead; Bloodsport vs. Lucky; Free Shipping vs. Hydra; Monsoon vs. Ragnarök; MadCatter vs. RailGun Max; Breaker Box vs. Falcon; WAR Hawk vs. Petunia (Science Channel exclusive – Mega Fights: Gears of Apocalypse). Main Event: Bite Force vs. Yeti The winners were Skorpios (KO), Bloodsport (3-0 UD), Hydra (KO), Monsoon (KO), RailGun Max (KO), Breaker Box (2-1 SD), WAR Hawk (KO), and Bite Force (3-0 UD)
134	4	"A Duck Only a Mother Could Love"	June 28, 2019	0.997
The carnage continues as 14 more robots wage war inside the BattleBox. Cobalt tries to show DUCK! how to fly, Rotator takes Bombshell for a spin, DeathRoll dances with Foxtrot, Quantum tries to take a bite out of Lock-Jaw, and End Game goes toe-to-toad with Ribbot. In the Main Event, Tombstone is back to put SawBlaze six feet under. Note: The Science Channel rerun was rescheduled for July 10th at 9:00pm. Fight Card: DUCK! vs. Cobalt; Rotator vs. Bombshell; Nelly the Ellybot vs. Rainbow; Quantum vs. Lock-Jaw; Kraken vs. Blacksmith; End Game vs. Ribbot; DeathRoll vs. Foxtrot (Science Channel exclusive – Mega Fights: Hall of Flame). Main Event: Tombstone vs. SawBlaze The winners were DUCK! (KO); Rotator (KO); Rainbow (KO); Lock-Jaw (KO); Blacksmith (2-1 SD); Ribbot (KO); DeathRoll (KO); Tombstone (KO)
135	5	"A Family Affair"	July 5, 2019	0.872
The stakes only get higher as teams in danger of going 0-2 feel the heat of the coming Desperado Tournament. Minotaur looks to bounce back in its first ever fight against Gigabyte, Witch Doctor gets a second chance to show its sturdiness against Captain Shrederator, and two undefeated families clash as Son of Whyachi and The Ewerts take on The Vasquez Family and Whiplash. Note: The Science Channel rerun aired on July 17th at 9:00pm. Fight Card: Black Dragon vs. Bloodsport; Captain Shrederator vs. Witch Doctor; Jasper vs. HUGE; Gigabyte vs. Minotaur; Mammoth vs. Uppercut; WanHoo vs. Shatter!; Texas Twister vs. Axe Backwards (Science Channel exclusive – Mega Fights: Blood Feud). Main Event: Son of Whyachi vs. Whiplash The winners were Black Dragon (KO), Witch Doctor (KO), HUGE (KO), Gigabyte (3-0 UD), Uppercut (KO), Shatter! (3-0 UD), Texas Twister (KO), and Whiplash (KO)
136	6	"Buckers and Brawlers"	July 12, 2019	0.817
Competition gets fierce as teams set their sights on making it into the top 16; when defending champ Bite Force takes on legendary flipper Bronco, top teams are pushed to the brink. Fight Card: Hydra vs. WAR Hawk; Sidewinder vs. Skorpios; Valkyrie vs. Ragnarök; Free Shipping vs. Yeti; Gruff vs. Copperhead; HyperShock vs. Monsoon; Petunia vs. Marvin (Science Channel exclusive – Mega Fights: Revenge at the Rodeo). Main Event: Bite Force vs. Bronco The winners were Hydra (KO); Skorpios (KO); Valkyrie (KO); Yeti (3-0 UD); Copperhead (2-1 SD); HyperShock (KO); Petunia (3-0 UD); and Bite Force (KO)
137	7	"The Most Destructive Robot"	July 19, 2019	0.911
With the Desperado Tournament looming, the entire field of vicious robots tighten the screws to guarantee their spot in the Top 16. Quantum and Death Roll compare tooth to tail ratios, Lock-Jaw goes Duck hunting, SawBlaze and Blacksmith fight fire with fire, and in the Main Event, Tombstone and Rotator look to settle a year-long feud. Fight Card: DeathRoll vs. Quantum; Bombshell vs. Cobalt; Gemini vs. Tantrum; Lock-Jaw vs. DUCK!; SawBlaze vs. Blacksmith; RailGun Max vs. Shellshock; Ribbot vs. Falcon (Science Channel exclusive – Mega Fights: BattleBox Bloodshed). Main Event: Tombstone vs. Rotator The winners were DeathRoll (KO); Cobalt (KO); Tantrum (3-0 UD); Lock-Jaw (3-0 UD); SawBlaze (2-1 SD); RailGun Max (KO); Ribbot (KO); and Rotator (KO)
138	8	"The Desperado Tournament II"	July 26, 2019	0.872
The highly anticipated Desperado Tournament is finally here: Eight struggling bots face three potential matchups in hopes of securing their place in The Top 16 — all in one insane night. Only one will walk away with a guaranteed shot at The Giant Nut. Fight Card: Quarter-finals: Minotaur vs. Lucky; End Game vs. Gruff; Black Dragon vs. Captain Shrederator; WAR Hawk vs. Ragnarök. Semi-finals: Minotaur vs. End Game; Black Dragon vs. WAR Hawk. Final: Minotaur vs. Black Dragon. Exhibition matches: Deep Six vs. Axe Backwards; Extinguisher vs. The Four Horsemen (Science Channel exclusive – Mega Fights: Duel of the Desperados). The quarter-final winners were Minotaur (KO, 119 seconds), End Game (KO, 179 seconds), Black Dragon (KO, 78 seconds), and WAR Hawk (KO, 165 seconds); Semifinal winners were Minotaur (KO, 156 seconds) and Black Dragon (KO, 61 seconds); Tournament winner: Black Dragon (3-0 UD). Exhibition match winners were Deep Six (KO) and The Four Horsemen (2-1 SD).
139	9	"Eyes on the Prize"	August 9, 2019	0.897
The second half of the 2019 season begins as the best combat robots from around the world try to earn a spot in the Top 16, and ultimately claim the most coveted trophy in combat robotics: The Giant Nut. Huge squares off against the undefeated Gigabyte. Wan Hoo looks to cut Mammoth down to size. Deep Six is back. And in our Main Event, a pair of 2-0 teams clash for the first time ever, when Whiplash takes on Witch Doctor. Fight Card: HUGE vs. Gigabyte; Breaker Box vs. Uppercut; WanHoo vs. Mammoth; Son of Whyachi vs. Texas Twister; SubZero vs. P1; Nelly the Ellybot vs. Deep Six. Rumble: Double Jeopardy vs. Rainbow vs. Extinguisher (Science Channel exclusive – Reign of Terror). Main Event: Witch Doctor vs. Whiplash. The winners were HUGE (3-0 UD); Uppercut (KO); WanHoo (3-0 UD); Son of Whyachi (KO); SubZero (KO); Deep Six (3-0 UD); Rainbow (3-0 UD); and Witch Doctor (3-0 UD).
140	10	"Flips, Fires, and Flinches"	August 16, 2019	0.802
The 2019 season rages on and with the world championship tournament looming, 14 robots steel their nerves to prove they belong in the Top 16. Fight Card: Hydra vs. Petunia; Yeti vs. Rainbow; Skorpios vs. Tantrum; Free Shipping vs. Bronco; Valkyrie vs. Monsoon; Chronos vs. Copperhead. Main Event: Bite Force vs. HyperShock. The winners were Hydra (KO); Yeti (KO); Skorpios (3-0 UD); Free Shipping (3-0 UD); Valkyrie (3-0 UD); Chronos (KO); and Bite Force (3-0 UD).
141	11	"Like a Bot to a Flame"	August 23, 2019	0.881
As The Top 16 looms even closer, every uncertain team looks to make their case to the selection committee. Fight Card: DUCK! vs. Quantum; Blacksmith vs. Captain Shrederator; Bombshell vs. Lock-Jaw; Tombstone vs. Gruff; End Game vs. Cobalt; Ribbot vs. SawBlaze; Shatter! vs. Kingpin (Science Channel exclusive - Knockout Mayhem). Main Event: Rotator vs. DeathRoll The winners were Quantum (3-0 UD); Blacksmith (KO); Lock-Jaw (KO); Tombstone (3-0 UD); End Game (KO); SawBlaze (3-0 UD); Shatter! (KO); and DeathRoll (3-0 UD).
142	12	"This Is Gonna Be Huge"	August 30, 2019	0.796
The BattleBots World Championship Tournament is right around the corner and for many teams, it’s do or die. Fight Card: Minotaur vs. Shatter!; Son of Whyachi vs. Kraken; RailGun Max vs. WanHoo; Witch Doctor vs. Gigabyte; Breaker Box vs. Bloodsport; Texas Twister vs. Whiplash. Main Event: HUGE vs. Bronco The winners were Minotaur (KO); Son of Whyachi (KO), RailGun Max (3-0 UD); Witch Doctor (KO), Bloodsport (KO), Whiplash (KO); and HUGE (3-0 UD).
143	13	"One Flipper to Rule Them All"	September 6, 2019	0.846
It’s the end of the regular season, and every bot has one last chance to impress the Selection Committee in order to take their place in the Top 16. Fight Card: Breaker Box vs. Hypershock; Yeti vs. Tantrum; Copperhead vs. WAR Hawk; Bite Force vs. Monsoon; Free Shipping vs. RailGun Max; Uppercut vs. Skorpios; Bloodsport vs. The Four Horsemen (Science Channel exclusive - Titan Showdown). Main Event: Hydra vs. Bronco The winners were Hypershock (KO); Yeti (KO); Copperhead (KO); Bite Force (KO); Free Shipping (2-1 SD); Uppercut (KO); Bloodsport (KO); and Hydra (KO).
144	14	"Live to Die Another Day"	September 13, 2019	0.860
In an unprecedented move, the selection committee has done something you’ll have to tune in to see! Fight Card: Valkyrie vs. Quantum; Yeti vs. DUCK!; Lock-Jaw vs. Skorpios; Hypershock vs. HUGE. Rumble: RailGun Max vs. Bloodsport vs. Uppercut; Rotator vs. Blacksmith; Son of Whyachi vs. Copperhead. Main Event: Minotaur vs. Cobalt. Exhibition match: Ribbot vs. Sharkoprion (Science Channel exclusive – Gears of Glory). The winners were Quantum (KO); Yeti (3-0 UD); Lock-Jaw (KO); HUGE (KO); Uppercut (KO); Blacksmith (3-0 UD); Son of Whyachi (KO); and Minotaur (3-0 UD). The exhibition match winner was Ribbot (KO).
145	15	"My Super Sweet 16"	September 20, 2019	0.806
The 2019 BattleBots World Championship Tournament begins with the Round of 16! It’s the best of best in robot combat. The sixteen deadliest bots from across the globe will battle it out, head to head, all with their eyes on the ultimate prize in robot combat: The Giant Nut! Fight Card: Bite Force vs. Uppercut, Black Dragon vs. Lock-Jaw, Tombstone vs. Quantum, Whiplash vs. HUGE, Witch Doctor vs. Blacksmith, SawBlaze vs. Son of Whyachi, Hydra vs. Minotaur, DeathRoll vs. Yeti. Exhibition match: Nightmare vs. Mammoth (Science Channel exclusive – Battle of the Sweet 16). The winners were Bite Force (KO, 57 seconds); Lock-Jaw (2-1 SD); Tombstone (KO, 32 seconds); Whiplash (2-1 SD); Witch Doctor (KO, 144 seconds); SawBlaze (3-0 UD); Minotaur (KO, 42 seconds); and DeathRoll (KO, 88 seconds). The exhibition match winner was Mammoth (KO).
146	16	"2019 BattleBots World Championship"	September 27, 2019	0.914
After a grueling season of robotic warfare, eight of the most lethal bots on the planet remain standing to battle it out for the 2019 BattleBots World Championship. Who will succumb to the pressure? Who will rise to glory? And at the end of the night, who will hoist the Giant Nut? Quarter-Finals: Bite Force vs. Lock-Jaw, Tombstone vs. Whiplash, Witch Doctor vs. SawBlaze, Minotaur vs. DeathRoll. Semi-Finals: Bite Force vs. Tombstone, Witch Doctor vs. DeathRoll. Tag Team Exhibition Rumble: Team U.K. (Monsoon & Ragnarök) vs. Team USA (MadCatter & Chronos) (Science Channel exclusive - Last Bot Alive). Finals: Bite Force vs. Witch Doctor. The Quarter-Final winners were Bite Force (KO, 176 seconds), Tombstone (KO, 100 seconds), Witch Doctor (KO, 146 seconds), and DeathRoll (KO, 124 seconds). The Semi-Final winners were Bite Force (KO, 52 seconds) and Witch Doctor (2-1 SD). The Exhibition Rumble winner was Team U.K. (Monsoon & Ragnarök) (3-0 UD). The 2019 BattleBots World Champion is Bite Force (KO, 116 seconds).
