= Alison Haislip =

American actress

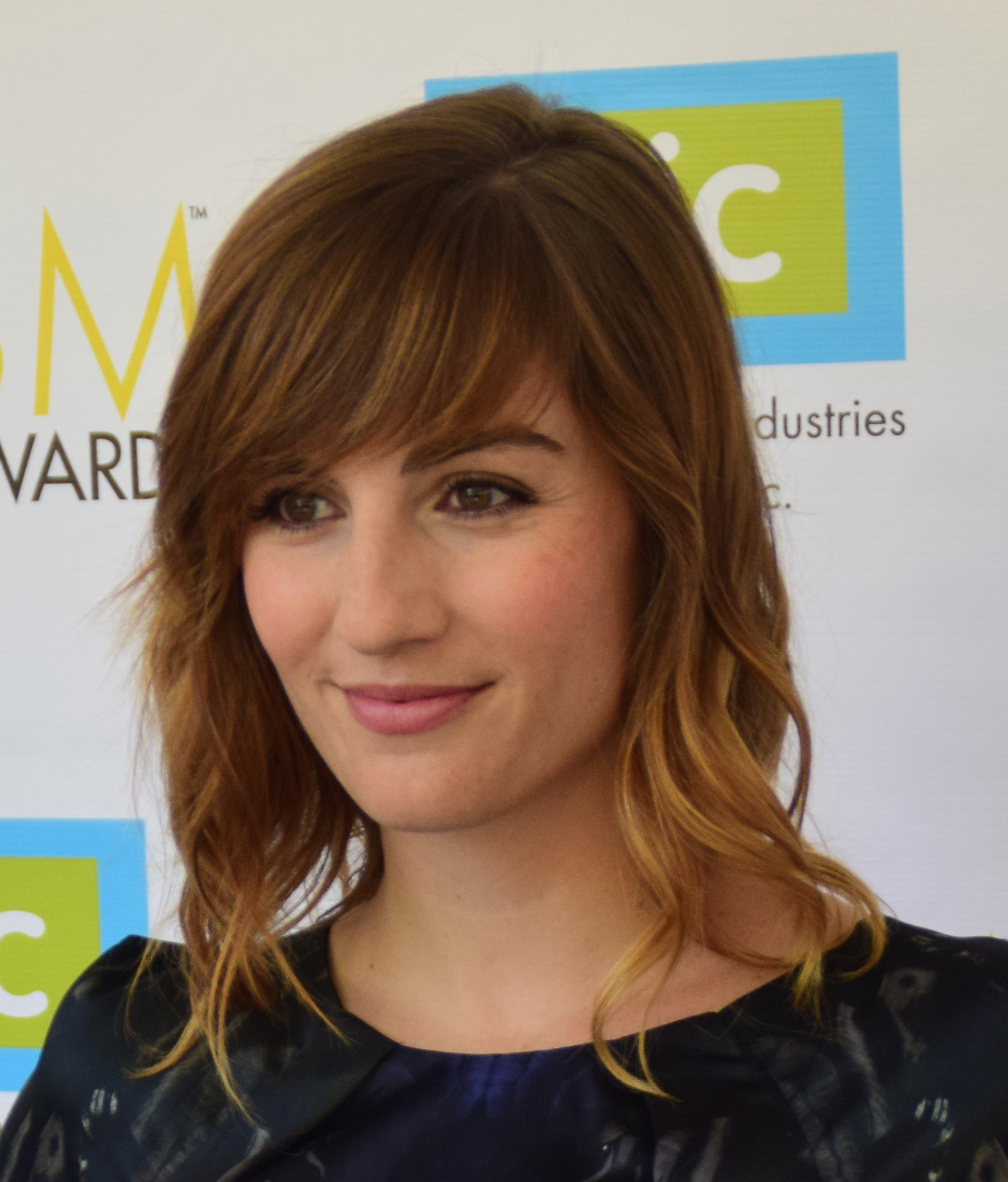
- Haislip in 2015
- Born: Alison Fesq Haislip; Tewksbury Township, New Jersey, U.S.
- Occupations: Actress, television correspondent
- Years active: 2004–present
- Website: alisonhaislip.com

Alison Fesq Haislip is an American actress and former television personality for Attack of the Show! on the first incarnation of the G4 network and the NBC reality singing competition show The Voice.

== Early life ==
Haislip is a native of Tewksbury Township, New Jersey and a graduate of Voorhees High School. She graduated with honors from Boston College, having studied theater. She also trained at the British American Drama Academy. Afterwards, she moved to Los Angeles to pursue her acting career.

=== Attack of the Show! ===
In October 2007, Haislip landed at G4 after being told by a G4 employee, who was a patron where she worked as a bartender, that she would be a great fit at the network. Haislip hosted "The Feed" segment and did correspondent work numerous times for Attack of the Show! before being hired full-time around Spring 2008. She often substituted as the show's co-host for Olivia Munn.

For most of 2010, in addition to her pre-filmed segments and occasional guest hosting, she also shared responsibility for presenting "The Feed" with Blair Herter, typically anchoring it live on two of the four days that Attack of the Show! aired per week.

On November 7, 2011, Haislip announced during a hosting appearance on Attack of the Show! that she was leaving G4.

=== Other projects and appearances ===
From May 2008 to February 2009, Haislip hosted a weekly podcast ranging in length from two to five minutes for G4's website. Tech News went on an indefinite hiatus as part of the network's financial cutbacks. She co-hosted the inaugural season of American Ninja Warrior with Blair Herter. She was the sideline reporter for the second and third seasons. Haislip was the sideline and behind the scenes reporter for the sixth and seventh seasons of the ABC reality competition show BattleBots.

In September 2008, in correlation with the launch of her own official website, Haislip started releasing approximately four to six-minute unedited video updates to stay more connected with her fans. Topics have ranged from answering fan questions posted on her forums to giving updates on her upcoming segments for Attack of the Show! before they air. Occasionally, Haislip had a guest alongside her while filming the blog. Past guests include fellow G4 personalities Kevin Pereira and Blair Herter, actress/dancer/writer Imogen Church, and Alison's younger brother, Greg Haislip.

Starting in mid-May 2009, Ford Fiesta Movement mission videos, and Baaaznian Production short films, replaced the original blog format of Haislip's videos. The second to last video blog or "vlog" format video, it was uploaded on May 11, 2009. However, a brief Christmas vlog was uploaded on December 24, 2009, in which Haislip explained she had stopped making vlogs because she has been much busier in the recent months, than in the first half of 2009.

In spring 2009, Haislip began making additional videos, as required by her involvement with the Ford Fiesta Movement, a campaign in which she was one of 100 people to win one of the cars for six months, started by Ford Motor Company to help promote the model's then-upcoming U.S. release.

Beginning in June 2009, Haislip has appeared in a number of short HD films, along with a troupe of actors. They are currently available for viewing on YouTube. The first film, entitled "New Moongasm - A New Moon Parody", was uploaded on June 15, 2009. Her next short film was titled "Hi. I'm Joel Rush.", which was released on June 29, 2009. A third film, titled "Love Automatically", was uploaded on July 26, 2009. "Love Automatically" was also directed by Haislip.

On March 28, 2011, it was announced that Haislip would join the cast of the NBC reality singing competition series The Voice as the backstage and social networking correspondent for season one. Her position allowed her to tweet what is happening in the competition, as well as talk to contestants backstage in the "V Room". She was replaced by Christina Milian for season two.

In 2012, Haislip joined The Morning After, a Hulu original web series, as co-host. She remain with the show until the web series ended on April 24, 2014.

Also in May 2012, Haislip began co-hosting a new show on the Nerdist YouTube channel titled 4 Points with Alex Albrecht. Haislip and Alex Albrecht discuss four topics with a member of the Nerdist community as well as a celebrity, usually known for their work in television or movies. In May 2014, it was announced that Haislip had joined Team Unicorn, replacing Michele Boyd as "Blue Unicorn". On April 6, 2015, Haislip began co-hosting a new show on the Nerdist Network titled: "Half Hour Happy Hour". Also in 2015, Haislip appeared in Alan Tudyk's web series Con Man as Faith.

== Filmography ==
=== Film ===
List of films and roles
Year	Title	Role	Notes
2004	Coffee	Jane	
2004	Hotties	Liz	
2005	Believers Among Us	Courtney	
2005	Indigo Hearts	Jennifer	
2006	Wasted	Mahdis	
2007	Into the Arms of Strangers	Marie	
2007	The Indian	Shelby	
2008	Heart of Now	Jamie	
2009	The Donner Party	Mary Graves	
2011	Division III: Football's Finest	Jennifer	
2013	Waking	Amanda	
2013	Screwed	Patty	
2014	Freshwater	Claudia Mosley	
2014	Video Games: The Movie	Herself	Commentator
2015	Mega Shark Versus Kolossus	Ali	
2015	Chatter	Carolyn Terry	
2017	Dead Night	Jenni Whitmore	
2017	The Babymoon	Dustin Bieberton	
2017	The Concessionaires Must Die!	Martha Wayne	
2017	Saturn Returns	Johanna	
2020	Allan the Dog	Ellie	
2023	ReBroken	Bella	

=== Television ===
List of television appearances and roles
Year	Title	Role	Notes
2007	I Hate My 30s	Jessica	Appears in "I Have to Go #30" episode
2008	Reno 911!	Bride	Appears in "Junior Runs for Office" episode
2008– 2009	Whacked Out Videos	Herself	Host
2008– 2011	Attack of the Show!	Herself	"The Feed" correspondent/field reporter and occasional co-host; 90 episodes
2009– 2011	American Ninja Warrior	Herself	Co-host, with Blair Herter
2011	The Voice	Herself	Social media host, Twitter and backstage correspondent; 13 episodes
2012	Battleground	Ali Laurents	Main cast; all episodes
2012	The Morning After	Herself	Co-host
2011	Doctor Who: Best of the Doctor	Herself	Commentator
2011	Doctor Who: Best of the Monsters	Herself	Commentator
2011	Doctor Who: Best of the Companions	Herself	Commentator
2011	Doctor Who: Best of the Christmas Specials	Herself	Commentator
2012	The Science of Doctor Who	Herself	Commentator
2012	The Women of Doctor Who	Herself	Commentator
2012	The Timey-Wimey of Doctor Who	Herself	Commentator
2012	The Destinations of Doctor Who	Herself	Commentator
2013	Royal Records	Chloe Walker	Television film
2013	Zach Stone Is Gonna Be Famous	Carrie	"Zach Stone Is Gonna Be the Zachelor" guest star
2013	Franklin & Bash	Mandy	"Control" guest star
2013	MyMusic	Present Nerd	"Ghosts!!!" and "Saying Goodbye" guest star
2013	Raptor Raptor	Arlene P. Weinercannon XIV	"How to Leave a Comment!" guest star
2014	Shameless	Doctor	"My Oldest Daughter" guest star
2014	Spooked	D.J.	"Paranormal Professionals" guest star
2014	Talking Marriage with Ryan Bailey	Herself	"Alison Haislip and Nick Mundy" guest star
2014	The Team Unicorn Saturday Action Fun Hour!	Cobalt/Blue Unicorn	Lead
2014	NCIS	Lieutenant Commander Hannah Banks	"Twenty Klicks" guest star
2014	Bones	Alexis Sherman	"The Puzzler in the Pit"
2015	BattleBots	Herself	Commentator; Season 6
2015	Titans Grave: The Ashes of Valkana	Kiliel / Herself	10 episodes
2015	Con-Man	Faith	Recurring role
2016	How to Build Everything	Herself	Science Communicator; Season 1
2016– 2019	Robot Chicken	Orange Soda; Mrs. Pepper/Predator Mom/Dracula's Bride; (voices)	Episode: "Fridge Smell"; Episode: "Spike Fraser in: Should I Happen to Back Into a Horse"
2018	BattleBots	Herself	Guest judge
2018	Home	Becky	Episode: "Home Facade"
2019	Superstore	Joelle	Episode: "Salary"
2020	Heart Baby Eggplant	Alison	7 episodes
2022	9-1-1: Lone Star	Brandy	Episode: "Spring Cleaning"; Episode: "A Bright and Cloudless Morning"
2022	Mermaze Mermaidz	Rivera	15 episodes
2025	Marvel Zombies	Sandra (voice)	1 episode
2026	The Pitt	Morgan Stiles	3 episodes
