= BattleBots season 6 =

BattleBots
- Season 6
- No. of episodes: 6

Release
- Original network: ABC
- Original release: June 21 – July 26, 2015

Season chronology
- ← Previous; Season 5 Next → Season 7

The sixth season of the American competitive television series BattleBots premiered on ABC on June 21, 2015. This season is also referred to as Season 1, as it is the first season after it was rebooted.

In February 2015, ABC announced that it was reviving the series after a thirteen-year hiatus, which would feature a 16-team single-elimination tournament.

Former UFC fighter Kenny Florian and MLB/NFL Sportscaster Chris Rose hosted, Faruq Tauheed acted as the arena announcer, and Alison Haislip was the sideline and behind the scenes reporter. Molly McGrath was the presenter.

Robots in season 6 competed in one 250-pound weight class, as opposed to the multiple weight classes in seasons 1–5.

== Contestants ==
This season sees teams from only two countries competing with their robots. Five from the United Kingdom and the rest from the United States. Competitors from the US hail from five different states, including fourteen from California.

Contestants

Robot	Weapon	Builder	Hometown	Elim. in
(California) Bite Force	Lifter, Grabber	Paul Ventimiglia	Mountain View, CA	Won
(California) Tombstone	Horizontal Bar Spinner	Ray Billings	Placerville, CA	Runner-up
(California) Bronco	Launcher	Alexander Rose; Reason Bradley	Sausalito, CA	SF
(California) Ghost Raptor	Horizontal Bar Spinner, Lifter	Chuck Pitzer	Newark, CA	SF
(California) Icewave	Overhead Bar Spinner	Marc DeVidts	Burlingame, CA	QF
(Massachusetts) Overhaul	Lifter, Grabber	Charles Guan	Cambridge, MA	QF
(California) Stinger	Lifter	Matt Maxham	Sacramento, CA	QF
(Florida) Witch Doctor	Vertical Disc Spinner	Andrea Suarez	Miami Springs, FL	QF
(California) Chomp	Grabber	Zoe Stephenson	Glendale, CA	Ro16
(Florida) HyperShock	Vertical Double Disc Spinner	Will Bales	Miami, FL	Ro16
(California) Lock-Jaw	Grabber	Donald Hutson	San Diego, CA	Ro16
(California) OverDrive	Lifter	Christian Carlberg	San Luis Obispo, CA	Ro16
(California) Plan X	Vertical Bar Spinner	Lisa Winter; Mike Winter	Berkeley, CA	Ro16
(United Kingdom) Radioactive	Axe	Kane Aston	Hemel Hempstead, United Kingdom	Ro16
(United Kingdom) Warhead	Horizontal Disc Spinner, Grabber, Flamethrower	Simon Scott; Ian Lewis	Poole, United Kingdom	Ro16
(Wisconsin) Warrior Clan	Launcher, Horizontal Ring Spinner	Clint Ewert	Abbotsford, WI	Ro16

Robot	Weapon	Builder	Hometown	Elim. in
(Florida) Captain Shrederator	Full Body Shell Spinner	Brian Nave	Ormond Beach, FL	Q
(California) Complete Control	Lifter, Grabber, Flamethrower	Derek Young	San Francisco, CA	Q
(California) Counter Revolution	Vertical Disc Spinners	Curt Meyers	San Jose, CA	Q
(Florida) Mohawk	Grabber, Flamethrower	Tom Bales	Miami, FL	Q
(Florida) Nightmare	Vertical Disc Spinner	Jim Smentowski	Bradenton, FL	Q
(Colorado) Razorback	Grabber, Lifter	Zack Bieber	Wellington, CO	Q
(Florida) Sweet Revenge	Horizontal Bar Spinner	Nola Garcia; Billy Garcia	Coral Gables, FL	Q
(California) Wrecks	Vertical Disc Spinner	Dan Chatterton	Petaluma, CA	Q
(United Kingdom) Bull Dog	Launcher	John Frizzle; Ian Watts	Lewes, East Sussex, United Kingdom	DNC
(United Kingdom) Chronic	Launcher	Alan Young	Leicester, United Kingdom	DNC
(California) Splatter	Vertical Disc Spinner, Lifter	Jeff Vasquez	Thousand Oaks, CA	DNC

SF – Semifinals
QF – Quarterfinals
Ro16 – Round of 16

Q – Qualifying
DNC – Did not compete

== Qualifying ==
There were a total of 28 robots. Bull Dog, Chronic, Splatter, and Counter Revolution were entered as reserve bots; of these, only Counter Revolution was chosen to compete, after Beta had to forfeit due to technical problems, but Beta was able to return for the 2016 season.

Episode	Battle	Winner	Loser	Method	Time
1 (June 21, 2015)	1	Icewave	Razorback	KO	1:30
1 (June 21, 2015)	2	Plan X	Wrecks	Decision (Unanimous)	3:00
1 (June 21, 2015)	3	Bite Force	Warhead	Decision (Unanimous)	3:00
1 (June 21, 2015)	4	Warrior Clan	Nightmare	KO	1:52
2 (June 28, 2015)	1	Lock-Jaw	Overhaul	Decision (Split)	3:00
2 (June 28, 2015)	2	Bronco	Witch Doctor	KO	0:50
2 (June 28, 2015)	3	Tombstone	Counter Revolution	KO	0:37
2 (June 28, 2015)	4 (Note: Only highlights from these battles were shown)	Stinger	Captain Shrederator	KO	1:52
2 (June 28, 2015)	5	OverDrive	Chomp	KO	1:57
2 (June 28, 2015)	6	Radioactive	Sweet Revenge	Decision (Unanimous)	3:00
2 (June 28, 2015)	7	HyperShock	Mohawk	KO	0:35
2 (June 28, 2015)	8	Ghost Raptor	Complete Control	Decision (Unanimous)	3:00

The robot was the winner of the battle and moved on to the Round of 16.
The robot was chosen as a "Wildcard" pick and moved on to the Round of 16.
The robot was the loser of the battle and was eliminated.

== Bracket Phase ==
=== Seedings ===
1. Tombstone
2. Icewave
3. Bite Force
4. Bronco
5. Stinger
6. Lock-Jaw
7. Warrior Clan
8. Overdrive
9. Witch Doctor*
10. Ghost Raptor
11. Overhaul*
12. Warhead*
13. Plan X
14. Hypershock
15. Chomp*
16. Radioactive

* = Robots that were awarded a Wildcard

Season 6 Tournament Bracket

Round of 16
#1 Tombstone	KO^{[a]}
#16 Radioactive
#8 OverDrive
#9 Witch Doctor	KO^{[a]}
#5 Stinger	UD^{[b]}
#12 Warhead
#4 Bronco	KO^{[a]}
#13 Plan X
#2 Icewave	KO^{[a]}
#15 Chomp
#7 Warrior Clan
#10 Ghost Raptor	KO^{[a]}
#6 Lock-Jaw
#11 Overhaul	KO^{[a]}
#3 Bite Force	KO^{[a]}
#14 HyperShock

Quarter-finals
#1 Tombstone	KO^{[a]}
#9 Witch Doctor
#5 Stinger
#4 Bronco	KO^{[a]}
#2 Icewave
#10 Ghost Raptor	KO^{[a]}
#11 Overhaul
#3 Bite Force	SD^{[c]}

Semi-finals
#1 Tombstone	KO^{[a]}
#4 Bronco
#10 Ghost Raptor
#3 Bite Force	KO^{[a]}

Championship
#1 Tombstone
#3 Bite Force	SD^{[c]}

^{a} KO: Knockout
^{b} UD: Unanimous Decision
^{c} SD: Split Decision

=== Round of 16 ===
Episode	Battle	Winner	Loser	Method	Time
3 (July 5, 2015)	1	Icewave	Chomp	KO	1:00
3 (July 5, 2015)	2	Stinger	Warhead	Decision (Unanimous)	3:00
3 (July 5, 2015)	3	Ghost Raptor	Warrior Clan	KO	2:57
3 (July 5, 2015)	4	Bronco	Plan X	KO	0:40
4 (July 12, 2015)	1	Witch Doctor	OverDrive	KO	1:24
4 (July 12, 2015)	2	Tombstone	Radioactive	KO	1:09
4 (July 12, 2015)	3	Overhaul	Lock-Jaw	KO	2:01
4 (July 12, 2015)	4	Bite Force	HyperShock	KO	2:41

The robot was the winner of the battle and moved on to the quarterfinals.
The robot was the loser of the battle and was eliminated.

=== Quarter-finals ===
The quarterfinals in this single-elimination tournament will see four robots move on to the semi-finals.

Episode	Battle	Winner	Loser	Method	Time
5 (July 19, 2015)	1	Bronco	Stinger	KO	1:18
5 (July 19, 2015)	2	Tombstone	Witch Doctor	KO	1:01
5 (July 19, 2015)	3	Bite Force	Overhaul	Decision (Split)	3:00
5 (July 19, 2015)	4	Ghost Raptor	Icewave	KO	0:46

The robot was the winner of the battle and moved on to the semifinals.
The robot was the loser of the battle and was eliminated.

=== Semi-finals and Championship ===
The semi-finals and finals in this single-elimination tournament will see a champion bestowed with the BattleBots Giant Nut. A non-tournament rumble took place in episode 6 alongside the semi-finals and finals.

Episode	Battle	Winner	Loser	Method	Time
6 (July 26, 2015)	1	Tombstone	Bronco	KO	2:09
6 (July 26, 2015)	2	Bite Force	Ghost Raptor	KO	1:44
6 (July 26, 2015)	Championship				
6 (July 26, 2015)	1	Bite Force	Tombstone	Decision (Split)	3:00

Non-Tournament Rumble

Episode	Rumble	Winner	Losers	
6 (July 26, 2015)	1	Nightmare	Overhaul	Witch Doctor

The robot was the winner of the battle.
The robot was the loser of the battle and was eliminated.
The robot was the winner of the battle and became the champion of BattleBots 2015.

== Episodes ==
The season ended averaging 4.59 million viewers.

No. overall	No. in season	Title	Original release date	U.S. viewers (millions)
95	1	"The Battle Begins: Qualifiers, Part 1"	June 21, 2015	5.44
The first eight of the 28 teams competed in a head to head matchup of the qualifying round. The winners were; Icewave (KO, 90 seconds), Plan X (UD), Bite Force (UD), and Warrior Clan (KO, 112 seconds).
96	2	"Crunch Time: Qualifiers, Part 2"	June 28, 2015	4.84
The last 16 of the 28 teams competed in a head to head matchup of the qualifying round. The winners were; Lock-Jaw (SD), Bronco (KO, 50 seconds), Tombstone (KO, 37 seconds), Stinger (KO, 112 seconds), OverDrive (KO, 117 seconds), Radioactive (UD), HyperShock (KO, 35 seconds), and Ghost Raptor (UD).
97	3	"Full Metal Bracket: Round of 16 Part 1"	July 5, 2015	4.15
The first eight of the 16 teams competed in a head to head matchup of the Round of 16. Warhead, Overhaul, Witch Doctor, and Chomp were selected as Wildcards from Qualifying. The winners were; Icewave (KO, 60 seconds), Stinger (UD), Ghost Raptor (KO, 177 seconds), and Bronco (KO, 40 seconds).
98	4	"Last Chance to Advance: Round of 16 Part 2"	July 12, 2015	4.07
The last eight of the 16 teams competed in a head to head matchup of the Round of 16. The winners were; Witch Doctor (KO, 84 seconds), Tombstone (KO, 69 seconds), Overhaul (KO, 121 seconds), and Bite Force (KO, 161 seconds).
99	5	"The Great 8: Quarterfinals"	July 19, 2015	4.45
The final eight teams competed in a head to head matchup of the quarterfinals. The winners were; Bronco (KO, 78 seconds), Tombstone (KO, 61 seconds), Bite Force (SD), and Ghost Raptor (KO, 46 seconds).
100	6	"One Bot Rules Them All: Final 4/Finals"	July 26, 2015	4.62
The final four teams competed in a head to head matchup of the semi-finals and the Championship. The winners were; Tombstone (KO, 129 seconds) and Bite Force (KO, 104 seconds) with Bite Force (SD) winning the Championship.
