= BattleBots season 7 =

BattleBots
- Season 7
- No. of episodes: 10

Release
- Original network: ABC
- Original release: June 23 – September 1, 2016

Season chronology
- ← Previous; Season 6 Next → Season 8

The seventh season of the American competitive television series BattleBots premiered on ABC on June 23, 2016 and concluded on September 1, 2016. It was the second season since the show was rebooted in 2015 and was the last season to be broadcast on ABC.

In November 2015, ABC announced that it had renewed the BattleBots revival for a second season, featuring an expansion to a 32-team field.

Former UFC fighter Kenny Florian and MLB/NFL Sportscaster Chris Rose returned from the previous season to host this second season of BattleBots on ABC. Also returning from last season were Faruq Tauheed as the arena announcer and Alison Haislip as the sideline and behind the scenes reporter. Molly McGrath has been replaced by Samantha Ponder as the presenter.

Robots in season 7, as in season 6, competed in one 250-pound weight class, as opposed to the multiple weight classes in seasons 1–5.

== Judges ==
Judging the matches for this season were former BattleBots competitor and special effects artist Fon Davis, the face of Nerdist, Jessica Chobot, and new judge, Agents of S.H.I.E.L.D. actor Clark Gregg, as well as celebrity guest judges MythBusters host Adam Savage (episode 2), NFL tightend Vernon Davis (episode 6), and Vsauce creator Michael Stevens (episode 7).

== Contestants ==
This season saw teams from six different countries competing with their robots. Four from Canada, five from the United Kingdom, and one each from Australia, France and Brazil. Competitors from the U.S. hail from fourteen different states from Florida down south, all the way up to Alaska.

Contestants

Robot	Weapon	Builder	Hometown	Elim. in
(California) Tombstone	Horizontal Bar Spinner	Ray Billings	Placerville, CA	W
(Georgia (U.S. state)) Bombshell	Modular Spinner, Hammer	Michael Jeffries	Norcross, GA	RU
(Brazil) Minotaur	Vertical Drumspinner	Marco Antonio Meggiolaro	Rio de Janeiro, Brazil	SF
(Alaska) Yeti	Drumspinner	Gregory Gibson	Wasilla, AK	SF
(United Kingdom) Beta	Hammer	John Reid	Oxford, United Kingdom	QF
(California) Bronco	Launcher	Alexander Rose; Reason Bradley	Sausalito, CA	QF
(California) Chomp	Grabber	Zoe Stephenson	Glendale, CA	QF
(Texas) Poison Arrow	Drumspinner	Zachary Goff	Houston, TX	QF
(California) Bite Force	Vertical Bar Spinner	Paul Ventimiglia	Mountain View, CA	Ro16
(Massachusetts) Brutus	Vertical Disc Spinner	Adam Bercu	Somerville, MA	Ro16
(Florida) HyperShock	Vertical Double Disc Spinner	Will Bales	Miami, FL	Ro16
(California) Mega Tento	Grabber	Lisa Winter	Berkeley, CA	Ro16
(Florida) Nightmare	Vertical Disc Spinner	Jim Smentowski	Bradenton, FL	Ro16
(Colorado) Razorback	Vertical Drum Spinner, Lifting Arm, Grabbing Jaw	Zack Bieber	Wellington, CO	Ro16
(Utah) Red Devil	Articulating Sawblade, grabber	Jerome Miles	Spanish Fork, UT	Ro16
(United Kingdom) Warhead	Horizontal Disc Spinner, Grabber, Flamethrower	Simon Roy Scott; Ian Anthony Lewis	Poole, United Kingdom	Ro16
(New Jersey) Blacksmith	Hammer, Flamethrower	Al Kindle	Edison, NJ	Ro32
(Florida) Captain Shrederator	Full Body Shell Spinner	Brian Nave	Ormond Beach, FL	Ro32
(Utah) ChromeFly	Horizontal Bar Spinners	George Matus	Salt Lake City, UT	Ro32
(United Kingdom) Cobalt	Horizontal Bar Spinner	Dave Moulds	Bromsgrove, United Kingdom	Ro32
(California) Complete Control	Grabber, Lifter, Flamethrower	Derek Young	San Francisco, CA	Ro32
(California) Escape Velocity	Launcher	Raymond Barsa	Manhattan Beach, CA	Ro32
(California) Ghost Raptor	Horizontal Bar Spinner, Lifter	Chuck Pitzer	Newark, CA	Ro32
(California) Icewave	Overhead Bar Spinner	Marc DeVidts	Burlingame, CA	Ro32
(California) Lock-Jaw	Grabber, Launcher	Donald Hutson	San Diego, CA	Ro32
(Canada) Lucky	4-Arm Launcher	Mark Demers	Ottawa, Canada	Ro32
(Massachusetts) Overhaul	Grabber, Lifter	Charles Guan	Cambridge, MA	Ro32
(California) The Ringmaster	Full Body Ring Spinner	Hal Rucker	Hillsborough, CA	Ro32
(Wisconsin) Son of Whyachi	Full Body Cage Spinner	Lucas Ewert	Dorchester, WI	Ro32
(California) Stinger	Lifter	Matt Maxham	Sacramento, CA	Ro32
(Wisconsin) Warrior Clan	Launcher, Full Body Ring Spinner	Clint Ewert	Abbotsford, WI	Ro32
(Florida) Witch Doctor	Vertical Disc Spinner	Andrea Suarez	Miami Springs, FL	Ro32

Robot	Weapon	Builder	Hometown	Elim. in
(Massachusetts) Black Ice	Shooter	Dan Barry	South Hadley, MA	Q
(Canada) Bucktooth Burl	Drumspinner	Julia Chernushevich	Saskatoon, SK	Q
(Australia) Death Roll	Vertical Disc Spinner	Erica Hediger	Red Hill, Australia	Q
(California) The Disk O' Inferno	Horizontal Disc Spinner	Jason Bardis	Irvine, CA	Q
(Ohio) Moebius	Full Body Shell Spinner	Michael "Shaggy" Macht	Beavercreek, OH	Q
(Florida) Mohawk	Grabber, Flamethrower	Tom Bales	Miami, FL	Q
(France) Obwalden Overlord	Grabber	Rob Knight	Divonne-les-Bains, France	Q
(California) OverDrive	Vertical Bar Spinner	Christian Carlberg	San Luis Obispo, CA	Q
(United Kingdom) Photon Storm	Grabber	Ed Hoppitt	Woodbridge, United Kingdom	Q
(Florida) Rotator	Horizontal Disc Spinners	Victor Soto	Doral, FL	Q
(Massachusetts) SawBlaze	Articulating Sawblade, Flamethrower	Jamison Go	Cambridge, MA	Q
(California) Splatter	Vertical Disc Spinner, Lifter	Jeff Vasquez	Thousand Oaks, CA	Q
(Pennsylvania) SubZero	Launcher	Jerry Clarkin	Malvern, PA	Q
(Florida) Ultimo Destructo	Horizontal Bar Spinner, Launcher	Sean J. Irvin	Valkaria, FL	Q
(Virginia) UltraViolent	Launcher	Andrew Peterson	Blacksburg, VA	Q
(California) Wrecks	Vertical Disc Spinner	Dan Chatterton	Petaluma, CA	Q
(California) Bad Kitty	Vertical Disc Spinner	Bradley Hanstad	Brea, CA	DNQ
(Canada) Basilisk	Launcher	Lucas Sloan	Edmonton, Alberta	DNQ
(United Kingdom) Creepy Crawlies	Grabbers	Kelly Smith	Brighton, United Kingdom	DNQ
(California) Gemini	Horizontal Bar Spinner	Agustus (Ace) Shelander	San Francisco, CA	DNQ
(California) Invader	Full Body Shell Spinner	John Mladenik	Escondido, CA	DNQ
(Canada) Lycan	Grabber	Ravi Baboolal	Cambridge, Ontario	DNQ
(California) Skorpios	Articulating Sawblade	Orion Beach	Santa Rosa, CA	DNQ
(New York (state)) Ambush	Articulating Sawblades	Lydia Yeckley	Rochester, NY	DNC
(Massachusetts) The Dentist	Vertical Double Disc Spinners	Rebecca Li	Boston, MA	DNC
(California) HellaChopper	Full Body Cage Spinner	Kimberly Everhart	Lake Arrowhead, CA	DNC
(Massachusetts) Preying Mantis	Unclear	Sasha Robocop	Boston, MA	DNC
(Massachusetts) Road Rash	Articulating Sawblades	Frederick Moore; Dane Kouttron	Boston, MA	DNC

SF – Semifinals
QF – Quarterfinals
Ro16/32 – Round of 16/32

Q – Qualifying
DNQ – Did not Qualify
DNC – Did not compete

== Pre-qualifying ==
Of the 48 available spots, 44 robots were chosen by the selection committee. However, they could not agree on the last four spots out of 12 evenly matched bots. During this pre-qualifying round, those 12 teams faced off in a "Rumble," where three bots entered the arena together and battled in a single 3-minute round without hazards. Only one bot from each rumble moved on to the Qualifying round. This round of the competition aired on May 10, 2016, as a special episode before the season began. Although 44 robots were chosen to go to qualifying automatically, one had mechanical problems and was replaced by a wildcard pick from the pre-qualifying losers.

Episode	Rumble	Winner	Losers		Method	Time
1 (May 10, 2016)	1	Son of Whyachi	Creepy Crawlies	UltraViolent	KO^{[x]}	1:16
1 (May 10, 2016)	2	Blacksmith	Basilisk	Gemini	UD^{[y]}	3:00
1 (May 10, 2016)	3	Mohawk	Invader	Lycan	KO^{[x]}	2:52
1 (May 10, 2016)	4	Black Ice	Bad Kitty	Skorpios	KO^{[x]}	2:35

The robot was the winner of the rumble and moved on to the Qualifying Round.
These robots were the losers of the rumble and were eliminated.
This robot was passed through pre-qualifying to qualifying as a last minute replacement for a robot with mechanical issues.

^{x} KO: Knockout
^{y} UD: Unanimous Decision
^{z} SD: Split Decision

== Qualifying ==
The 48 qualified robots battle against elimination. The 24 winning robots advance to the round of 32, the 24 losing robots are admitted to the wildcard pool, in which eight will also advance to the round of 32 on July 7, 2016.

Episode	Battle	Winner	Loser	Method	Time
2 (June 23, 2016)	1	Bronco	Blacksmith	KO^{[x]}	2:16
2 (June 23, 2016)	2	Captain Shrederator	Death Roll	KO^{[x]}	2:04
2 (June 23, 2016)	3	Beta	Lucky	UD^{[y]}	3:00
2 (June 23, 2016)	4 (Note: Only highlights from these battles were shown)	Icewave	SubZero	UD^{[y]}	3:00
2 (June 23, 2016)	5	The Ringmaster	Ultimo Destructo	KO^{[x]}	1:48
2 (June 23, 2016)	6	Escape Velocity	OverDrive	UD^{[y]}	3:00
2 (June 23, 2016)	7	Tombstone	Black Ice	KO^{[x]}	1:01
2 (June 23, 2016)	8	Minotaur	Photon Storm	KO^{[x]}	1:41
2 (June 23, 2016)	9	Chomp	The Disk O' Inferno	SD^{[z]}	3:00
2 (June 23, 2016)	10	HyperShock	UltraViolent	KO^{[x]}	1:30
2 (June 23, 2016)	11	Complete Control	Bombshell	UD^{[y]}	3:00
2 (June 23, 2016)	12	Bite Force	Mohawk	KO^{[x]}	1:36
2 (June 23, 2016)	13	ChromeFly	Bucktooth Burl	UD^{[y]}	3:00
2 (June 23, 2016)	14	Warrior Clan	Splatter	UD^{[y]}	3:00
2 (June 23, 2016)	15	Stinger	Nightmare	KO^{[x]}	0:44
2 (June 23, 2016)	16	Warhead	The Obwalden Overlord	KO^{[x]}	2:59
3 (June 30, 2016)	1	Brutus	Moebius	KO^{[x]}	0:47
3 (June 30, 2016)	2	Son of Whyachi	Ghost Raptor	KO^{[x]}	1:05
3 (June 30, 2016)	3	Yeti	Lock-Jaw	UD^{[y]}	3:00
3 (June 30, 2016)	4	Poison Arrow	Mega Tento	UD^{[y]}	3:00
3 (June 30, 2016)	5	Cobalt	Overhaul	KO^{[x]}	1:26
3 (June 30, 2016)	6	Razorback	SawBlaze	SD^{[z]}	3:00
3 (June 30, 2016)	7	Red Devil	Wrecks	KO^{[x]}	1:56
3 (June 30, 2016)	8	Witch Doctor	Rotator	KO^{[x]}	0:42

The robot was the winner of the battle and moved on to the Round of 32.
The robot was chosen as a "Wildcard" pick and moved on to the Round of 32.
The robot was the loser of the battle and was eliminated.

^{x} KO: Knockout
^{y} UD: Unanimous Decision
^{z} SD: Split Decision

== Tournament ==
=== Seeding ===
1. Tombstone
2. Bronco
3. Witch Doctor
4. Bite Force
5. Stinger
6. Son of Whyachi
7. Minotaur
8. Icewave
9. Beta
10. Complete Control
11. Hypershock
12. Yeti
13. Chomp
14. Cobalt
15. Razorback
16. Brutus
17. Lock-Jaw*
18. Ghost Raptor*
19. Bombshell*
20. Captain Shrederator
21. Lucky*
22. Warrior Clan
23. Warhead
24. Overhaul*
25. Nightmare*
26. Blacksmith*
27. Poison Arrow
28. Mega Tento*
29. The Ringmaster
30. Red Devil
31. Chrome Fly
32. Escape Velocity

* = Robots that have been awarded a Wildcard

Season 7 Tournament Bracket

Round of 32
#1 Tombstone	KO^{[x]}
#32 Escape Velocity
#16 Brutus	SD^{[z]}
#17 Lock-Jaw
#8 Icewave
#25 Nightmare	KO^{[x]}
#9 Beta	KO^{[x]}
#24 Overhaul
#4 Bite Force	UD^{[y]}
#29 The Ringmaster
#13 Chomp	KO^{[x]}
#20 Captain Shrederator
#5 Stinger
#28 Mega Tento	SD^{[z]}
#12 Yeti	KO^{[x]}
#21 Lucky
#2 Bronco	KO^{[x]}
#31 ChromeFly
#15 Razorback	KO^{[x]}
#18 Ghost Raptor
#7 Minotaur	KO^{[x]}
#26 Blacksmith
#10 Complete Control
#23 Warhead	KO^{[x]}
#3 Witch Doctor
#30 Red Devil	KO^{[x]}
#14 Cobalt
#19 Bombshell	KO^{[x]}
#6 Son of Whyachi
#27 Poison Arrow	KO^{[x]}
#11 HyperShock	KO^{[x]}
#22 Warrior Clan

Round of 16
#1 Tombstone	KO^{[x]}
#16 Brutus
#25 Nightmare
#9 Beta	KO^{[x]}
#4 Bite Force
#13 Chomp	UD^{[y]}
#28 Mega Tento
#12 Yeti	KO^{[x]}
#2 Bronco	KO^{[x]}
#15 Razorback
#7 Minotaur	KO^{[x]}
#23 Warhead
#30 Red Devil
#19 Bombshell	UD^{[y]}
#27 Poison Arrow	KO^{[x]}
#11 HyperShock

Quarter-finals
#1 Tombstone	UD^{[y]}
#9 Beta
#13 Chomp
#12 Yeti	KO^{[x]}
#2 Bronco
#7 Minotaur	KO^{[x]}
#19 Bombshell	KO^{[x]}
#27 Poison Arrow

Semi-finals
#1 Tombstone	UD^{[y]}
#12 Yeti
#7 Minotaur
#19 Bombshell	KO^{[x]}

Final
#1 Tombstone	KO^{[x]}
#19 Bombshell

^{x} KO: Knockout
^{y} UD: Unanimous Decision
^{z} SD: Split Decision

=== Round of 32 ===
Episode	Battle	Winner	Loser	Method	Time
4 (July 7, 2016)	1	Yeti	Lucky	KO^{[x]}	2:44
4 (July 7, 2016)	2	Minotaur	Blacksmith	KO^{[x]}	3:00
4 (July 7, 2016)	3	Bronco	ChromeFly	KO^{[x]}	1:00
4 (July 7, 2016)	4	Red Devil	Witch Doctor	KO^{[x]}	1:27
5 (July 21, 2016)	1	Warhead	Complete Control	KO^{[x]}	1:26
5 (July 21, 2016)	2	Razorback	Ghost Raptor	KO^{[x]}	1:36
5 (July 21, 2016)	3	Tombstone	Escape Velocity	KO^{[x]}	0:45
5 (July 21, 2016)	4	Poison Arrow	Son of Whyachi	KO^{[x]}	0:58
6 (July 28, 2016)	1	Beta	Overhaul	KO^{[x]}	3:00
6 (July 28, 2016)	2	HyperShock	Warrior Clan	KO^{[x]}	2:12
6 (July 28, 2016)	3	Mega Tento	Stinger	SD^{[z]}	3:00
6 (July 28, 2016)	4 (Note: Only highlights from these battles were shown)	Nightmare	Icewave	KO^{[x]}	0:48
6 (July 28, 2016)	5	Brutus	Lock-Jaw	SD^{[z]}	3:00
6 (July 28, 2016)	6	Bombshell	Cobalt	KO^{[x]}	1:45
6 (July 28, 2016)	7	Bite Force	The Ringmaster	UD^{[y]}	3:00
6 (July 28, 2016)	8	Chomp	Captain Shrederator	KO^{[x]}	2:08

The robot was the winner of the battle and moved on to the Round of 16.
The robot was the loser of the battle and was eliminated.

^{x} KO: Knockout
^{y} UD: Unanimous Decision
^{z} SD: Split Decision

=== Round of 16 ===
Episode	Battle	Winner	Loser	Method	Time
7 (August 4, 2016)	1	Minotaur	Warhead	KO^{[x]}	1:11
7 (August 4, 2016)	2	Poison Arrow	HyperShock	KO^{[x]}	2:32
7 (August 4, 2016)	3	Bombshell	Red Devil	UD^{[y]}	3:00
7 (August 4, 2016)	4	Bronco	Razorback	KO^{[x]}	1:21
8 (August 25, 2016)	1	Tombstone	Brutus	KO^{[x]}	0:59
8 (August 25, 2016)	2	Beta	Nightmare	KO^{[x]}	2:59
8 (August 25, 2016)	3	Yeti	Mega Tento	KO^{[x]}	0:44
8 (August 25, 2016)	4	Chomp	Bite Force	UD^{[x]}	3:00

The robot was the winner of the battle and moved on to the Quarterfinals.
The robot was the loser of the battle and was eliminated.

^{x} KO: Knockout
^{y} UD: Unanimous Decision
^{z} SD: Split Decision

=== Quarterfinals ===
Episode	Battle	Winner	Loser	Method	Time
9 (September 1, 2016)	1	Yeti	Chomp	KO^{[x]}	2:24
9 (September 1, 2016)	2	Tombstone	Beta	UD^{[y]}	3:00
9 (September 1, 2016)	3	Bombshell	Poison Arrow	KO^{[x]}	1:35
9 (September 1, 2016)	4	Minotaur	Bronco	KO^{[x]}	2:54

The robot was the winner of the battle and moved on to the Semifinals.
The robot was the loser of the battle and was eliminated.

^{x} KO: Knockout
^{y} UD: Unanimous Decision
^{z} SD: Split Decision

=== Semifinals ===
Episode	Battle	Winner	Loser	Method	Time
10 (September 1, 2016)	1	Bombshell	Minotaur	KO^{[x]}	2:50
10 (September 1, 2016)	2	Tombstone	Yeti	UD^{[y]}	3:00

The robot was the winner of the battle and moved on to the Final.
The robot was the loser of the battle and was eliminated.

^{x} KO: Knockout
^{y} UD: Unanimous Decision
^{z} SD: Split Decision

Non-Tournament Rumble

A special fan-favorite rumble took place in episode 10 alongside the Semifinals and the Final.

Episode	Rumble	Winner	Losers		Method	Time
10 (September 1, 2016)	1	Bite Force	Witch Doctor	Wrecks	KO^{[x]}	2:12

The robot was the winner of the rumble.
These robots were the losers of the rumble.

^{x} KO: Knockout
^{y} UD: Unanimous Decision
^{z} SD: Split Decision

=== Final ===
Episode	Battle	Champion	Loser	Method	Time
10 (September 1, 2016)	1	Tombstone	Bombshell	KO^{[x]}	0:53

The robot was the winner of the battle and became the champion of BattleBots 2016.
The robot was the loser of the battle and became the runner-up of BattleBots 2016.

^{x} KO: Knockout
^{y} UD: Unanimous Decision
^{z} SD: Split Decision

== Episodes ==
No. overall	No. in season	Title	Original release date	U.S. viewers (millions)
101	1	"The Gears Awaken"	May 10, 2016	1.97
Twelve robots compete in a "Rumble" to advance to the Qualifying Round. Three bots enter the arena together and battle in a single 3-minute round without hazards. The winners were: Son of Whyachi (KO, 76 seconds), Mohawk (KO, 172 seconds), Blacksmith (UD), and Black Ice (KO, 155 seconds).
102	2	"Robots Activate: Qualifying Round Begins"	June 23, 2016	3.91
The first 32 of the 48 teams competed in a head to head matchup of the Qualifying Round. UltraViolent was selected as a wildcard pick from the pre-qualifying round. The winners were: Bronco (KO, 136 seconds), Captain Shrederator (KO, 124 seconds), Beta (UD), Icewave (UD), The Ringmaster (KO, 108 seconds), Escape Velocity (UD), Tombstone (KO, 61 seconds), Minotaur (KO, 101 seconds), Chomp (SD), HyperShock (KO, 90 seconds), Complete Control (UD), Bite Force (KO, 96 seconds), ChromeFly (UD), Warrior Clan (UD), Stinger (KO, 44 seconds), and Warhead (KO, 179 seconds).
103	3	"There Will Be Bot Blood: The Qualifying Round Concludes"	June 30, 2016	3.59
The remaining of the 48 teams, competed in a head to head matchup of the Qualifying Round. The winners were: Brutus (KO, 47 seconds), Son of Whyachi (KO, 65 seconds), Yeti (UD), Poison Arrow (UD), Cobalt (KO, 86 seconds), Razorback (SD), Red Devil (KO, 116 seconds), and Witch Doctor (KO, 42 seconds).
104	4	"We're Gonna Need a Bigger Bracket: The Round of 32, Part 1"	July 7, 2016	3.45
The wildcard picks were revealed and the first battles of the Round of 32 were completed. The wildcards from Qualifying were; Blacksmith, Lucky, Bombshell, Nightmare, Ghost Raptor, Lock-Jaw, Mega Tento, and Overhaul. The winners were: Yeti (KO, 164 seconds), Minotaur (KO, 180 seconds), Bronco (KO, 60 seconds), and Red Devil (KO, 87 seconds).
105	5	"Shake, Battle and Roll: The Round of 32, Part 2"	July 21, 2016	2.96
The Round of 32 continued with four more battles. The winners were: Warhead (KO, 86 seconds), Razorback (KO, 96 seconds), Tombstone (KO, 45 seconds), and Poison Arrow (KO, 58 seconds).
106	6	"The Good, the Bot, and the Ugly: The Round of 32 Concludes"	July 28, 2016	3.24
The Round of 32 concluded with eight battles. The winners were: Beta (KO, 180 seconds), HyperShock (KO, 132 seconds), Mega Tento (SD), Nightmare (KO, 48 seconds), Brutus (SD), Bombshell (KO, 105 seconds), Bite Force (UD), and Chomp (KO, 128 seconds).
107	7	"Not So Sweet 16: The Round of 16 Part 1"	August 4, 2016	3.32
The first half of the Quarterfinals began. The winners were: Minotaur (KO, 71 seconds), Poison Arrow (KO, 152 seconds), Bombshell (UD), and Bronco (KO, 81 seconds).
108	8	"Rise of the Machines: The Round of 16 Part 2"	August 25, 2016	3.43
The second half of the Quarterfinals began. The winners were: Tombstone (KO, 59 seconds), Beta (KO, 179 seconds), Yeti (KO, 44 seconds), and Chomp (UD).
109	9	"Gr8 Expectations: The Quarterfinals"	September 1, 2016	5.61
Eight robots fight their way to the Championship as the Quarterfinals conclude. The winners were: Yeti (KO, 144 seconds), Tombstone (UD), Bombshell (KO, 95 seconds), and Minotaur (KO, 174 seconds).
110	10	"One Shining Bot: The Championship"	September 1, 2016	5.61
The final four robots fight their way in the BattleBox until one single bot is crowned champion. Also, a special fan-favorite robot rumble between Bite Force, Witch Doctor and Wrecks. (Winner: Bite Force by KO, 132 seconds) The winners were: Bombshell (KO, 170 seconds) and Tombstone (UD) with Tombstone (KO, 53 seconds) winning the Championship.
