= BattleBots: Bounty Hunters =

American spin-off TV series

- Genre: Robot competition
- Presented by: Chris Rose; Kenny Florian
- Country of origin: United States
- Original language: English
- No. of seasons: 1
- No. of episodes: 12

Production
- Running time: 60 minutes
- Production companies: Whalerock Industries; BattleBots Productions

Original release
- Network: Discovery+
- Release: January 4 – March 18, 2021

BattleBots: Bounty Hunters is a spinoff of the Discovery Channel's BattleBots. This show's first four episodes premiered on Discovery+ on January 4, 2021, and the Discovery Channel on March 18, 2021.

== Format ==
One iconic, destructive bot from the TV show BattleBots is chosen to be the bounty. Eight bots compete in a bracket to become the "bounty hunter" which will compete with the bounty bot. If the bounty hunter bot wins, the bot's team wins a portion of a $25,000 purse. The same rules and judging system apply as in BattleBots season 10.

== Contestants ==
Contestants

Robot	Builder(s)	Hometown
(Indiana) Aegis	Chris Sparzo	Fishers, IN
(India) Atom #94	Yash Deshmukh	Vadodara, Gujarat, India
(Florida) Axe Backwards	Kurt Durjan	Palm City, FL
(California) Axolotl	Alon Belkin	Northridge, CA
(New Jersey) Bale Spear	Earl B. Pancoast III	Salem, NJ
(Washington (state)) Big Dill	Emmanuel Carrillo	Seattle, WA
(New York (state)) Black Widow	Herrick Henzel	Newport, New York
(Massachusetts) Bloodsport	Justin Marple	Somerville, MA
(Florida) Captain Shrederator	Brian Nave	Ormond Beach, FL
(Washington (state)) Chomp	Zoe Stephenson	Seattle, WA
(California) Chronos	Jerry Serafin	Canoga Park, CA
(Washington (state)) Claw Viper	Kevin Milczewski	Seattle, WA
(Colorado) Copperhead	Zach Goff	Loveland, CO
(Indiana) Deadlift	Ryan Shulski	Indianapolis, IN
(Florida) Extinguisher	John Flaacke IV	Tampa, FL
(Wisconsin) Fusion	Reese Ewert	Dorchester, WI
(California) Gemini	Ace Shelander	Santa Monica, CA
(California) Ghost Raptor	Chuck Pitzer	San Jose, CA
(California) Gigabyte	Brent Rieker	Escondido, CA
(Wisconsin) GRABOT	Ben Davidson	Sheboygan, WI
(Florida) Gruff	Sam McAmis	Holiday, FL
(California) HiJinx	Jen Herchenroeder	Santa Rosa, CA
(Florida) Hypershock	Will Bales	Miami, FL

Robot	Builder(s)	Hometown
(Connecticut) HUGE	Jonathan Schultz	South Windsor, CT
(Nevada) JackPot	Jeff Waters	Las Vegas, NV
(Florida) Kraken	Matt Spurk	Titusville, FL
(California) Lock-Jaw	Donald Hutson	San Diego, CA
(California) MadCatter	Martin Mason	Pomona, CA
(California) Malice	Adrian "Bunny" Sauriol	San Jose, CA
(Maryland) Mammoth	Ricky Willems	Baltimore, MD
(New Hampshire) P1	Brandon Zalinsky	Hudson, NH
(New York (state)) Pain Train	Evan Arias	Staten Island, New York
(Virginia) Perfect Phoenix	Juli Johnson	Herndon, VA
(Florida) Rampage	Melaina Knox	Port St. Joe, FL
(Florida) Rotator	Victor Soto	Miami, FL
(Illinois) Rusty	David Eaton	Antioch, IL
(California) Sharkoprion	Edward D. Robinson	Poway, CA
(California) Skorpios	Zachary Lytle	Moraga, CA
(North Carolina) SlamMow!	Craig Danby	Raleigh, NC
(Indiana) Slap Box	Bryce Yankauskas	Knox, IN
(New York (state)) SMEEEEEEEEEEE	Joseph Fabiani	New York City, NY
(Florida) Sporkinok	Lilith Specht	Orlando, FL
(Texas) SubZero	Logan Davis	Irving, TX
(Texas) Tracer	Jason Woods	Mckinney, TX; Sacramento, CA
(Massachusetts) Valkyrie	Leanne Cushing	Cambridge, MA

Bounties

Robot	Builder(s)	Hometown
(United Kingdom) Beta	Gabriel Stroud & John Reid	Haslemere, England, United Kingdom
(California) Bronco	Reason Bradley & Alexander Rose	Sausalito, CA
(California) Icewave	Marc DeVidts	Burlingame, CA

Robot	Builder(s)	Hometown
(Wisconsin) Son of Whyachi	Luke Ewert	Dorchester, WI
(California) Tombstone	Ray Billings	Placerville, CA
(Florida) Witch Doctor	Andrea Gellatly (née Suarez)	Miami Springs, FL

== Bounty Hunters Bracket ==
=== Bounty #1: Bronco ===
Quarter-finals
Rotator	KO
Axolotl
Sharkoprion
Captain Shrederator	KO
Atom #94
MadCatter	KO
Chomp
Bale Spear	KO

Semi-finals
Rotator	UD
Captain Shrederator
MadCatter	KO
Bale Spear

Final
Rotator	KO
MadCatter

Bounty Match: Bronco vs. Rotator (UD)

=== Bounty #2: Icewave ===
Quarter-finals
Skorpios	UD
Black Widow
Tracer
P1	SD
HyperShock	UD
Sporkinok
Ghost Raptor	KO
Deadlift

Semi-finals
Skorpios	UD
P1
HyperShock	KO
Ghost Raptor

Final
Skorpios	UD
HyperShock

Bounty Match: Icewave vs. Skorpios (UD)

=== Bounty #3: Tombstone ===
Quarter-finals
Gemini
Gruff	KO
JackPot
Deadlift	KO
Mammoth
SMEEEEEEEEEEE	KO
Claw Viper
Kraken	UD

Semi-finals
Gruff	KO
Deadlift
SMEEEEEEEEEEE
Kraken	SD

Final
Gruff	UD
Kraken

Bounty Match: Tombstone (KO) vs. Gruff

=== Bounty #4: BETA ===
Quarter-finals
Axe Backwards
Lock-Jaw	KO
Fusion	KO
Rampage
HiJinx	KO
SlamMow!
Bloodsport	KO
Aegis

Semi-finals
Lock-Jaw	KO
Fusion
HiJinx
Bloodsport	KO

Final
Lock-Jaw	UD
Bloodsport

Bounty Match: BETA vs. Lock-Jaw (KO)

=== Bounty #5: Witch Doctor ===
Quarter-finals
Valkyrie	KO
Extinguisher
SubZero	KO
Pain Train
Malice	KO
Tracer
HUGE	UD
Slap Box

Semi-finals
Valkyrie
SubZero	KO
Malice	UD
HUGE

Final
SubZero	KO
Malice

Bounty Match: Witch Doctor (KO) vs. SubZero

=== Bounty #6: Son of Whyachi ===
Quarter-finals
Kraken
Rusty	UD
Copperhead	KO
Chronos
Gigabyte	KO
GRABOT
Big Dill	KO
Perfect Phoenix

Semi-finals
Rusty
Copperhead	KO
Gigabyte	KO
Big Dill

Final
Copperhead
Gigabyte	KO

Bounty Match: Son of Whyachi vs. Gigabyte (KO)

== Episodes ==
No.	Title	Original release date
1	"Bronco's Back!"	January 4, 2021
The Bounty Hunters Tournament begins with the first eight BattleBots looking to make a name for themselves against an icon hall-of-famer bot. The very first "bounty" is wanted: Bronco, the legendary flipper bot. Which team will collect the $25,000 bounty? Fan-favorites, newcomers, or legacy bots.
2	"Predator Becomes Prey"	January 4, 2021
The semi-finals leads up to the final match. The last bot still standing will be the "bounty hunter" that will have a chance to wrangle Bronco. Bounty Match: Bronco vs. Rotator (UD)
3	"Cold as Ice"	January 4, 2021
The Bounty Hunters Tournament continues. The second bounty is wanted: Icewave, an elite horizontal spinner bot will go head-to-head with the next "bounty hunter" bot.
4	"Hunt or Be Hunted"	January 4, 2021
It is the semi-finals and then the final match leading up to heat-up the bounty bot Icewave. Bounty Match: Icewave vs. Skorpios (UD)
5	"A Song of Fire and METAL"	February 11, 2021
Eight more teams have a chance to become the Bounty Hunter as they win the final match. However, it won't be easy because their bounty is the legendary Tombstone, the king of kinetic energy.
6	"Do We Have a King Slayer?"	February 11, 2021
It is do or die time when the winning bounty hunter bot takes on the most feared destructive bot of all-time, 2016 BattleBots champion, Tombstone. Bounty Match: Tombstone (KO) vs. Gruff
7	"Hammer of the Gods"	February 18, 2021
Eight more bots have a chance to collect another bounty. This time the bounty is placed on British bot BETA with its massive hammer that pounds bots into the arena floor.
8	"You Think You're Beta Than Me?"	February 18, 2021
A bounty hunter bot is determined and it has to collect its bounty on the mighty hammer of BETA. Bounty Match: BETA vs. Lock-Jaw (KO)
9	"Witchhunting"	March 11, 2021
There's a cash bounty on the head of fan-favorite bot Witch Doctor. Eight more teams are ready to collect, but first they must battle each other.
10	"The Doctor is In"	March 11, 2021
It is time to claim the bounty placed on Witch Doctor, but the remaining "contract killer" bots better beware of the Doc's voodoo drum spinner. Bounty Match: Witch Doctor (KO) vs. SubZero
11	"Reap What You Sow"	March 18, 2021
The final bounty bot is called; the long-time BattleBots contestant, Son of Whyachi one of the many successful bots from the Ewert family.
12	"The Empire Swipes Back"	March 18, 2021
It's time to claim the bounty on the legendary Son of Whyachi and the last-standing bounty hunter bot is coming to collect the reward. Bounty Match: Son of Whyachi vs. Gigabyte (KO)
