= BattleBots season 12 =

BattleBots
- Season 12
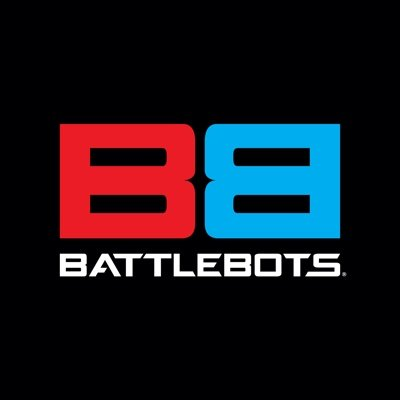
- No. of episodes: 19

Release
- Original network: Discovery; Science
- Original release: January 5 – May 25, 2023

Season chronology
- ← Previous; Season 11

The twelfth season of the American competitive television series BattleBots premiered on Discovery Channel on January 5, 2023. This is the fifth main-line season of Battlebots to premiere on Discovery Channel and the seventh main-line season since the show was rebooted in 2015; official material markets this season as World Championship VII.

Returning for the 12 season as hosts and analysts are MLB/NFL Sportscaster Chris Rose and former UFC fighter Kenny Florian, as well as BattleBox announcer Faruq Tauheed.

The "Upper Deck" is now a main staple in the BattleBox, along with kill saws and rotating screws as returning arena hazards. This season each team faces four guaranteed fights in the qualifying matches, fighting for one of 32 spots in the seventh world championship tournament. Also new for this season, fans can go to BattleBots website to see every robot's complete schedule, allowing more transparency for both teams and viewers. Unlike previous seasons which posted extra fights to YouTube or gave short recaps, every match in the preseason and postseason is televised in its entirety.

New this season are special champion banners hanging up over the entranceway, representing the robots that "reached the pinnacle" of the sport of robot combat by winning the Giant Nut trophy. The banners feature a picture of the champion bot with a Roman numeral denoting the competition that they won. Last season's champion, Tantrum, was the first team to witness their own banner unveiling before their match began.

== Judges ==
The 11-point scale system returned where the judges award 5 points for damage; 3 points for aggression; and 3 points for control.

The current judges are: former BattleBots contenders, Derek Young, Lisa Winter, and Fon Davis.

== Contestants ==
This season marked the 23rd year of the BattleBots competition. The lineup features 56 of the best heavyweight robots to fight head-to-head in the Battle Arena.

Every team will fight four times in the qualifying rounds. Their goal is to earn a spot in the top 32 in the winner-take-all championship tournament and ultimately become the 2022 BattleBots World Champion. New to this season, teams may appeal a judge's decision that they do not agree with, prompting a closer look and potentially overturning the decision. If this appeal fails, that team loses the ability to challenge for the remainder of the tournament.

Host City (Las Vegas, Nevada)

Contestants

Robot	Builder(s)	Hometown	Fight Record
(Arizona) Banshee	David Small	Phoenix, Arizona	1–3
(United Kingdom) Beta	John Reid	Oxford, England, United Kingdom	3–1
(Washington (state)) Big Dill	Emmanuel Carrillo	Seattle, WA	1–3
(Brazil) Black Dragon	Julio Cortez	Itajubá, Minas Gerais, Brazil	2–2
(California) Blip	Aren Hill	Mountain View, CA	2–2
(Massachusetts) Bloodsport	Justin Marple	Cambridge, MA	2–2
(Florida) Captain Shrederator	Brian Nave	Ormond Beach, FL	1–3
(Washington (state)) Claw Viper	Kevin Milczewski	Seattle, WA	3–1
(United Kingdom) Cobalt	John Mladenik & Dave Moulds	Oceanside, CA	3–1
(Colorado) Copperhead	Luke Quintal	Denver, CO	3–1
(Australia) DeathRoll	Steven Martin	Brisbane, Australia	2–2
(California) Doom*	Alejandro Pina	Whittier, CA	–
(Maryland) Doomba*	Brice Farrell	Baltimore, MD	0–2
(California) Double Tap*	Jonathan Collazo	San Jose, CA	2–0
(Alabama) Dragon King*	Will Prater	Birmingham, AL	1–1
(Ohio) Emulsifier	Matt Bores	Columbus, Ohio	1–3
(New Zealand) End Game	Jack Barker & Nick Mabey	Auckland, New Zealand	3–1
(California) Free Shipping	Gary Gin	San Leandro, CA	1–3
(Wisconsin) Fusion	Reese Ewert	Dorchester, WI	1–3
(California) Gigabyte	Derek Tran & Camden Walraff	Oceanside, CA	1–3
(California) Glitch	Kyle Miller	Berkeley, CA	0–4
(Florida) Gruff	Sam McAmis	Palm Harbor, FL	1–3
(California) HiJinx	Jen Herchenroeder	Oakland, CA	1–3
(California) Horizon	Joshua Kong	Los Angeles, California	1–3
(Connecticut) HUGE	Jonathan Schultz	South Windsor, CT	4–0
(Wisconsin) Hydra	Jake Ewert	Dorchester, WI	3–1
(Florida) HyperShock	Will Bales	Miami, FL	2–2
(Nevada) JackPot	Jeff Waters	Las Vegas, NV	2–2
(Florida) Kraken	Matt Spurk	Titusville, FL	0–4
(California) Lock-Jaw	Donald Hutson	San Diego, California	3–1
(Canada) Lucky	Mark Demers	Ottawa, Ontario, Canada	3–1

Robot	Builder(s)	Hometown	Fight Record
(California) MadCatter	Martin Mason	Pomona, CA	2–2
(California) Malice	Adrian "Bunny" Sauriol	San Jose, CA	3–1
(Maryland) Mammoth	Ricky Willems	Baltimore, MD	2–2
(Brazil) Minotaur	Marco Antonio Meggiolaro	Rio de Janeiro, Brazil	4–0
(United Kingdom) Monsoon	Tom Brewster	Coventry, United Kingdom	2–2
(Netherlands) Ominous	Tim Bouwens	Tilburg, Netherlands	1–3
(Georgia (U.S. state)) Overhaul	Charles Guan	Atlanta, GA	1–3
(United Kingdom) Quantum	James & Grant Cooper	Birmingham, United Kingdom	4–0
(Massachusetts) Ribbot	David Jin	Somerville, MA	1–3
(Massachusetts) RIPperoni	Anna Zolnikov	Cambridge, MA	3–1
(California) Riptide	Ethan Kurtz	Tarzana, CA	4–0
(Florida) Rotator	Victor Soto	Miami, FL	2–2
(Illinois) Rusty Jr.*	David Eaton	Antioch, IL	–
(Massachusetts) SawBlaze	Jamison Go	Cambridge, MA	3–1
(New York (state)) Shatter!	Adam Wrigley	Brooklyn, NY	1–3
(New York (state)) Shreddit Bro	Evan Arias	Staten Island, NY	2–2
(California) Skorpios	Zachary Lytle	Moraga, CA	2–2
(North Carolina) Slammo!*	Craig Danby	Raleigh, NC	0–2
(New Hampshire) Starchild	Brandon Zalinsky	Hudson, NH	0–4
(Texas) Switchback	Greg Needel	Dallas, TX	2–1
(California) Tantrum	Alex Grant & Ginger Schmidt	Mountain View, CA	1–3
(California) Terrortops*	Ben Burton	Long Beach, CA	2–0
(Nevada) Triton	Bradley Hanstad	Las Vegas, NV	2–2
(Massachusetts) Valkyrie	Lucy Du	Somerville, MA	2–2
(California) Whiplash	Matthew Vasquez	Thousand Oaks, CA	2–2
(Florida) Witch Doctor	Andrea Gellatly (née Suarez)	Miami, FL	3–1

* Not competing in the main tournament.

== Tournament bracket ==
=== Knockout stage ===
Round of 32
(Brazil) #1 Minotaur	KO
(Wisconsin) #32 Fusion
(Texas) #16 Switchback
(California) #17 Malice	UD
(Massachusetts) #8 SawBlaze	UD
(California) #25 Blip
(United Kingdom) #9 Cobalt
(United Kingdom) #24 Monsoon	KO
(Wisconsin) #4 Hydra	UD
(Australia) #29 DeathRoll
(United Kingdom) #13 Beta
(California) #20 Whiplash	KO
(United Kingdom) #5 Quantum
(Massachusetts) #28 Ribbot	KO
(Massachusetts) #12 RIPperoni
(Brazil) #21 Black Dragon	KO
(California) #2 Riptide	KO
(New York (state)) #31 Shatter!
(Canada) #15 Lucky
(Florida) #18 HyperShock	UD
(New Zealand) #7 End Game	UD
(California) #26 Tantrum
(Colorado) #10 Copperhead	UD
(Florida) #23 Rotator
(Florida) #3 Witch Doctor	KO
(Nevada) #30 JackPot (Home Team)
(California) #14 Lock-Jaw	KO
(Massachusetts) #19 Bloodsport
(Connecticut) #6 HUGE	KO
(California) #27 Skorpios
(Washington (state)) #11 Claw Viper
(California) #22 MadCatter	SD

Round of 16
(Brazil) #1 Minotaur	UD
(California) #17 Malice
(Massachusetts) #8 SawBlaze	KO
(United Kingdom) #24 Monsoon
(Wisconsin) #4 Hydra	KO
(California) #20 Whiplash
(Massachusetts) #28 Ribbot	KO
(Brazil) #21 Black Dragon
(California) #2 Riptide	KO
(Florida) #18 HyperShock
(New Zealand) #7 End Game
(Colorado) #10 Copperhead	UD
(Florida) #3 Witch Doctor	KO
(California) #14 Lock-Jaw
(Connecticut) #6 HUGE	UD
(California) #22 MadCatter

Quarter-finals
(Brazil) #1 Minotaur
(Massachusetts) #8 SawBlaze	KO
(Wisconsin) #4 Hydra
(Massachusetts) #28 Ribbot	KO
(California) #2 Riptide
(Colorado) #10 Copperhead	SD
(Florida) #3 Witch Doctor
(Connecticut) #6 HUGE	UD

Semi-finals
(Massachusetts) #8 SawBlaze	UD
(Massachusetts) #28 Ribbot
(Colorado) #10 Copperhead
(Connecticut) #6 HUGE	KO

Final
(Massachusetts) #8 SawBlaze	UD
(Connecticut) #6 HUGE

== Episodes ==
No. overall	No. in season	Title	Original release date	U.S. viewers (millions)
175	1	"ROBOTS, READY!!!"	January 5, 2023	0.666
It's opening night of BattleBots VII. All your favorite killer machines and genius teams are back for the number-one tournament in robotic sport. The BattleBots World Championship qualifiers kick off with an epic fight card, including fancied contenders like Witch Doctor, Ribbot, Glitch and Riptide. The climax is a Main Event for the ages, as the reigning champion Tantrum begins its title defense against Minotaur, the raging bull from Brazil. It's Robot Fighting Time! Fight Card: Ribbot vs. Witch Doctor; Quantum vs. Captain Shrederator; RIPperoni vs. Gruff; HUGE vs. Shatter!; Riptide vs. Glitch; Free Shipping vs. Gigabyte, MAIN EVENT: Tantrum vs. Minotaur The winners were Witch Doctor (KO, 75 seconds), Quantum (KO, 158 seconds), Gruff (UD), HUGE (KO, 120 seconds), Riptide (KO, 47 seconds), Free Shipping (KO, 121 seconds), and Minotaur (KO, 80 seconds).
176	2	"What the Flip?"	January 12, 2023	0.671
It's the second week of the Championship qualifiers and the temperature is rising. Fan favorites like Hypershock, Sawblaze, MadCatter and Whiplash return to the BattleBox, plus there's the debut of some exciting hotshot rookies. And at the end of the night, a menacing main event features two title holders:. Golden Bolt, winner End Game from New Zealand, takes on Blip, the flipper designed by Aren Hill who created the current Giant Nut holder Tantrum. Standby for Chaos! Fight Card: SawBlaze vs. HyperShock; Emulsifier vs. Fusion; Valkyrie vs. Mammoth; Whiplash vs. MadCatter; Switchback vs. Banshee; Big Dill vs. HiJinx, MAIN EVENT: End Game vs. Blip The winners were SawBlaze (UD), Fusion (UD), Valkyrie (KO, 105 seconds), MadCatter (KO, 117 seconds), Switchback (UD), HiJinx (KO, 112 seconds), and End Game (UD).
177	3	"Strike While the Bot's Hot"	January 19, 2023	0.637
It's the return of Deathroll, the Aussie Assassin that punches its blood-soaked fist in victory every time it destroys an opponent as they face the British bot destroyer, Cobalt. While a nautical monster with the biggest weapon in the field -- rookie Triton also has its first fight. Meanwhile Bot Legend Donald Hutson returns to try and resurrect Lock Jaw's reputation after a disappointing display last season. The night culminates in a tumultuous Main Event as the world's most infamous flipper Hydra looks to flip the script on the master of destruction, Rotator. Fight Card: Cobalt vs. DeathRoll; Claw Viper vs. Ominous; Bloodsport vs. Copperhead; Lock-Jaw vs. Malice; Triton vs. Lucky; JackPot vs. Skorpios, MAIN EVENT: ROTATOR vs. Hydra The winners were Cobalt (KO, 87 seconds), Claw Viper (KO, 166 seconds), Copperhead (KO, 35 seconds), Lock-Jaw (UD), Lucky (KO, 72 seconds), Skorpios (KO, 55 seconds), and Hydra (KO, 84 seconds).
178	4	"0 and 2. Am I Through?"	January 26, 2023	0.682
The stakes have doubled as World Championship VII heads into its fourth week. Eight robots have yet to fight; now they go head-to-head. Meanwhile six other squads look to improve their record in the BattleBox. Crippling crusher Quantum will take on the fearsome flame-thrower of Gruff and two famous veterans desperate for a win will be scrapping with each other as Whiplash and HyperShock collide in a critical Main Event. Fight Card: Black Dragon vs. Monsoon; Emulsifier vs. Malice; Overhaul vs. Starchild; Gruff vs. Quantum; Kraken vs. Beta; SHREDDIT BRO! vs. Horizon, MAIN EVENT: Whiplash vs. HyperShock The winners were Black Dragon (KO, 125 seconds), Malice (KO, 112 seconds), Overhaul (UD), Quantum (KO, 172 seconds), Beta (UD), SHREDDIT BRO! (UD), and Hypershock (KO, 108 seconds).
179	5	"Bad Blood"	February 2, 2023	0.741
The second round of qualifying fights reveals a fight card jam-packed with Giant Nut contenders. With visions of Championship glory, all the teams look to leave a lasting impression by unleashing fury inside the BattleBox. They want to make an impact but will it be a knockout? The lineup includes two teams with bad blood between them: community college team Madcatter, helmed by Martin Mason, taking on rising superstar Ethan Kurtz and Riptide. Claims of stolen designs are the backbone of this history and tonight they are ready to settle the score. Fight Card: Free Shipping vs. Minotaur; Claw Viper vs. Ribbot; Lock-Jaw vs. SawBlaze; Blip vs. HUGE; Witch Doctor vs. Fusion; Doomba vs. Double Tap, MAIN EVENT: MadCatter vs. Riptide The winners were Minotaur (KO, 121 seconds), Claw Viper (UD), SawBlaze (KO, 156 seconds), HUGE (UD), Witch Doctor (SD), Double Tap (KO), and Riptide (KO, 61 seconds).
180	6	"Robot Redemption"	February 9, 2023	0.560
It's just a few weeks into World Championship VII and if you thought things were violent, standby for some even more ferocious matchups. Two former "Most Destructive" bots, Rotator and Valkyrie go for victories; fan-favorites Skorpios and Aussie bot Deathroll, with its terrifying severed arm, try to destroy their opponents. The world's only Pizza Bot, Ripperoni, tries to slice through the former World Champion from New Zealand, End Game. But at the end of the night, there's a Main Event for the ages. In the most anticipated fight of the season so far, there's a rematch between current Giant Nut holders Tantrum and the formidable flipper Hydra, whose last match was ... controversial, to say the least. Get your spiciest popcorn ready! Fight Card: RIPperoni vs. End Game; SwitchBack vs. DeathRoll; Hijinx vs. Captain Shrederator; JackPot vs. Rotator; Big Dill vs. Skorpios; Valkyrie vs. Banshee, MAIN EVENT: Hydra vs. Tantrum The winners were RIPperoni (KO, 97 seconds), DeathRoll (KO, 104 seconds), Captain Shrederator (KO, 142 seconds), Rotator (KO, 169 seconds), Skorpios (KO, 86 seconds), Banshee (SD), and Tantrum (KO, 117 seconds).
181	7	"Violent Night"	February 16, 2023	0.586
In Vegas, where dreams are made… and broken, the stakes are climbing for 14 more teams as Week 7 of World Championship VII rolls on. Expect a heaping helping of destruction as Cobalt and Minotaur collide in a Main Event so violent, it should be rated "R". Fight Card: Bloodsport vs. Gigabyte; Claw Viper vs. Overhaul; Horizon vs. Monsoon; Starchild vs. Mammoth; Triton vs. Copperhead; Lucky vs. Kraken; MAIN EVENT: Minotaur vs. Cobalt The winners were Bloodsport (KO, 122 seconds), Claw Viper (UD), Monsoon (KO, 51 seconds), Mammoth (UD), Copperhead (UD), Lucky (UD), and Minotaur (KO, 174 seconds).
182	8	"Mirror, Mirror"	February 23, 2023	0.606
With the World Championship VII tournament approaching, some of the biggest names in the sport are jockeying for top seeds in tonight's fight card. Huge looks to keep its perfect season intact but faces the dual spinners of Fusion. Meanwhile the UK's crusher Quantum hopes to go 3-0 against Brazil's unkillable Black Dragon. The battle of the hammer bots will finally be decided when Beta has a showdown with Shatter! And, in the main event, it's the ultimate sibling rivalry when Blip steps into the Battlebox to face its sister team and defending World Champion Tantrum. Fight Card: Free Shipping vs. Hydra; HUGE vs. Fusion; Lock-Jaw vs. Glitch; Beta vs. Shatter!; Quantum vs. Black Dragon; Terrortops vs. Slammo!; MAIN EVENT: Tantrum vs. Blip The winners were Hydra (UD), HUGE (KO, 44 seconds), Lock-Jaw (KO, 52 seconds), Beta (UD), Quantum (UD), Terrortops (KO), and Blip (UD)
183	9	"You Want a Pizza Me?"	March 2, 2023	0.647
As the teams on this loaded fight card take on their third qualifying fight of the regular season, some are in dire need of a season-saving victory while others look to storm ahead to a top seed in the World Championship Tournament. With the selection committee watching their every move, it's up to the bots to deliver show-stopping performances and prove they belong amongst the best squads in the world. It's nonstop action and carnage, and it all builds to a kill-or-be-killed main event between two superstars: End Game and HyperShock. Fight Card: Gruff vs. Witch Doctor; Malice vs. Valkyrie; MadCatter vs. Big Dill; Ribbot vs. JackPot; Skorpios vs. SawBlaze; RIPperoni vs. HiJinx; MAIN EVENT: End Game vs. HyperShock The winners were Witch Doctor (KO, 95 seconds), Malice (Appealed JD), MadCatter (UD), JackPot (UD), SawBlaze (KO, 49 seconds), RIPperoni (KO, 101 seconds), and End Game (KO, 157 seconds)
184	10	"Mid-Season Mayhem"	March 9, 2023	0.483
World Championship VII has reached Week 10 and the pressure is on! With the Round of 32 just a few weeks away, time is running out for teams to make lasting impressions and prove they have tournament-qualifying talent. Tonight it's an eclectic mix of hard-hitting favorites like Riptide and Copperhead, struggling mid-tier sleepers like Mammoth and Shatter! and an electric main event between two bots both desperate for a big win: 2020 runner-up Whiplash and the Brits with Bite -- Monsoon. Fight Card: Riptide vs. Captain Shrederator; Mammoth vs. DeathRoll; Banshee vs. Emulsifier; Copperhead vs. Kraken; Horizon vs. Shatter!; Ominous vs. Shreddit Bro; MAIN EVENT: Whiplash vs. Monsoon The winners were Riptide (KO, 69 seconds), DeathRoll (KO, 48 seconds), Emulsifier (KO, 110 seconds), Copperhead (KO, 86 seconds), Horizon (SD), Ominous (UD), and Whiplash (UD)
185	11	"Never Say Die"	March 30, 2023	0.581
With the Round of 32 just around the corner, these 14 teams are at a crossroads. With half the Qualifiers already under their belt, tonight victory is crucial. For two British bots, Cobalt and Beta, a strong performance will all but guarantee a strong tournament seed. Meanwhile the strugglers fight to save their tournament lives and BattleBots reputations, including last season's co-rookie of the year, Glitch, languishing at a shocking 0-2. Top of the fight card is a Main Event so vicious, sparks will fly and one will die, when Bloodsport and Rotator collide in the BattleBox. Fight Card: Black Dragon vs. Beta; Cobalt vs. Overhaul; Switchback vs. Ominous; Triton vs. Glitch; Gigabyte vs. Starchild; JackPot vs. Captain Shrederator; MAIN EVENT: Rotator vs. Bloodsport The winners were Black Dragon (KO, 70 seconds), Cobalt (KO, 146 seconds), Switchback (KO, 74 seconds), Triton (KO, 106 seconds), Gigabyte (UD), JackPot (UD), and Bloodsport (KO, 107 seconds)
186	12	"Jaws and Claws"	April 6, 2023	0.598
With the World Championship VII tournament just around the corner, the race for the Giant Nut kicks into top gear. Tonight's fight card features some of the biggest names in the sport jockeying for tournament seedings in their final fight of the qualifying rounds. In a matchup between jaws and claws, Lock-Jaw squares off against Madcatter. Two of the fastest machines in BattleBots history will do battle when Hypershock tries to save its season against the 3-0 Claw Viper. And in what could be a preview of this year's Championship Final, in the MAIN Event, for the first time ever Sawblaze will face the formidable flipping power of Hydra. Fight Card: Lock-Jaw vs. Mad Catter; Gruff vs. Malice; Doomba vs. Dragon King; Claw Viper vs. Hypershock; Free Shipping vs. Big Dill; Shreddit Bro vs. Lucky; MAIN EVENT: SawBlaze vs. Hydra The winners were Lock-Jaw (KO, 179 seconds), Malice (KO, 90 seconds), Dragon King (KO), Hypershock (KO, 79 seconds), Big Dill (KO, 129 seconds), Lucky (KO, 75 seconds), and Hydra (UD)
187	13	"Pizza Party"	April 13, 2023	0.597
With dreams of World Championship glory only a few weeks away, anxious, desperate and dangerous robots are barreling into the arena and putting everything on the line. Tonight, more teams will wrap up their qualifying season with their fourth and final fight. While some seek a coveted top seed in the tournament, others just want to avoid a humiliating defeat. As the roller coaster ride to the Giant Nut nears its apex, it's the last chance to hop on board for the ultimate robot ride. Fight Card: Emulsifier vs. Quantum; Gigabyte vs. End Game; Shreddit Bro vs. Overhaul; Rotator vs. Fusion; Skorpios vs. Ribbot; Dragon King vs. Terrortops; MAIN EVENT: Copperhead vs. RIPperoni The winners were Quantum (UD), End Game (KO, 43 seconds), Shreddit Bro (SD), Rotator (KO, 113 seconds), Ribbot (KO, 135 seconds), Terrortops (UD), and RIPperoni (KO, 44 seconds)
188	14	"The Unbeatables"	April 20, 2023	0.589
The bigger they are the harder they fall: tonight, it's a battle of giant wheels as Starchild meets Huge. In the Main Event, Black Dragon is one fight away from a BattleBots record -- the number of battles fought without being knocked out. However tonight they face Riptide, who this year have destroyed every opponent in less than a minute. Let the big bot knockouts begin! Fight Card: Starchild vs. HUGE; Ominous vs. Shatter!; Triton vs. Horizon; Bloodsport vs. Beta; Mammoth vs. Kraken; Valkyrie vs. Glitch; MAIN EVENT: Black Dragon vs. Riptide The winners were HUGE (UD), Shatter! (UD), Triton (KO, 122 seconds), Beta (UD), Mammoth (UD), Valkyrie (UD), and Riptide (KO, 61 seconds)
189	15	"The Big Reveal"	April 27, 2023	0.537
It’s the final qualifying round, and 12 teams face one more fight before the Round of 32 lineup can finally be unveiled. First, defending champion Tantrum faces Whiplash. While some teams are confident of a top seeding in the tournament, others are just desperate to make the cut. Before the big reveal, Minotaur, the bull from Brazil, looks to take revenge on the master of voodoo -- Witch Doctor -- in the most anticipated grudge match of all time. Fight Card: Lucky vs. Cobalt; Blip vs. Banshee; Monsoon vs. DeathRoll; Tantrum vs Whiplash; Hijinx vs. Switchback; Slammo! vs. Double Tap, MAIN EVENT: Minotaur vs. Witch Doctor The winners were Cobalt (KO, 87 seconds), Blip (UD), Monsoon (KO, 52 seconds), Whiplash (KO, 59 seconds), Switchback (KO, 47 seconds), Double Tap (UD), and Minotaur (UD)
190	16	"World Championship VII Round of 32"	May 4, 2023	0.537
The World Championship begins: 16 bots will square off in the BattleBox. Fight Card: Witch Doctor vs. JackPot; Lucky vs. HyperShock; Lock-Jaw vs. Bloodsport; Riptide vs. Shatter!; Claw Viper vs. MadCatter; HUGE vs. Skorpios; Copperhead vs. Rotator; End Game vs. Tantrum The winners were Witch Doctor (KO, 140 seconds), HyperShock (UD), Lock-Jaw (KO, 82 seconds), Riptide (KO, 115 seconds), MadCatter (SD), HUGE (KO, 59 seconds), Copperhead (UD), and End Game (UD)
191	17	"8 More to Fall"	May 11, 2023	0.478
The World Championship Tournament continues -- eight more teams will fall. Fight Card: Black Dragon vs. RIPperoni; Cobalt vs. Monsoon; Minotaur vs. Fusion; Hydra vs. DeathRoll; Quantum vs. Ribbot; Switchback vs. Malice; Beta vs. Whiplash; SawBlaze vs. Blip The winners were Black Dragon (KO, 175 seconds), Monsoon (KO, 108 seconds), Minotaur (KO, 40 seconds), Hydra (UD), Ribbot (KO, 88 seconds), Malice (UD), Whiplash (KO, 52 seconds), and SawBlaze (UD)
192	18	"Round of 16"	May 18, 2023	0.461
Tonight is the Round of 16, where teams will clash in hopes of breaking into the quarterfinals! These bots survived the Round of 32, but tonight’s action will be bigger, louder and deadlier than ever. The Giant Nut is on the line -- who’s it gonna be? Fight Card: Ribbot vs. Black Dragon; Lock-Jaw vs. Witch Doctor; Malice vs. Minotaur; Copperhead vs. End Game; Monsoon vs. SawBlaze; Whiplash vs. Hydra; MadCatter vs. HUGE; HyperShock vs. Riptide The winners were Ribbot (KO), Witch Doctor (KO), Minotaur (UD), Copperhead (UD), SawBlaze (KO), Hydra (KO), HUGE (UD), and Riptide (KO)
193	19	"World Championship VII Finals"	May 25, 2023	0.690
The World Championship VII Finals have arrived! The most thrilling tournament in the sport's history reaches its epic conclusion tonight. Eight of the baddest bots in the world leave no screw unturned in their quest for BattleBots immortality. A grueling gauntlet awaits, but at the end of it all, one team will be crowned BattleBots World Champion and hoist the most coveted trophy in all of robot combat: the Giant Nut! And stay tuned after the action for the post-show: Road to the Giant Nut, where Chris and Kenny will chat with the new champion. Fight Card: SawBlaze vs. Minotaur; HUGE vs. Witch Doctor; Hydra vs. Ribbot; Copperhead vs. Riptide; Ribbot vs. SawBlaze; Copperhead vs. HUGE; HUGE vs. SawBlaze The winners of the quarter-finals were SawBlaze (KO), HUGE (UD), Ribbot (KO), Copperhead (UD), SawBlaze (UD), and HUGE (KO) The Giant Bolt Award winners were HUGE (Most Destructive), MadCatter (Founders Award), Rory Mangles (Monsoon) (EIS Award), and RIPperoni (Grant Imahara Award) (Best Design). The 2023 BattleBots World Champion is SawBlaze (UD).
