= BattleBots season 10 =

BattleBots
- Season 10
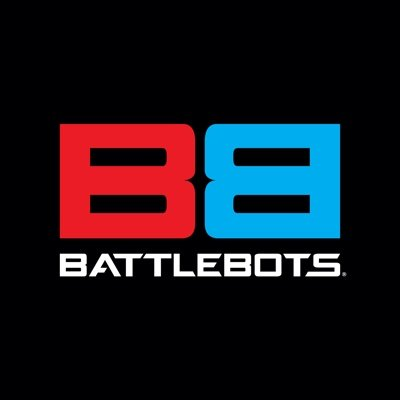
- No. of episodes: 14

Release
- Original network: Discovery
- Original release: December 3, 2020 – March 11, 2021

Season chronology
- ← Previous; Season 9 Next → Season 11

The tenth season of the American competitive television series BattleBots premiered on Discovery Channel on December 3, 2020, after being delayed due to the COVID-19 pandemic. This is the third season of Battlebots to premiere on Discovery Channel and the fifth season since the show was rebooted in 2015. The show introduced a new modified logo, with a pair of large red and blue "B"'s, making a "BB" logo atop the term "BATTLEBOTS". The subtitle "Fight Night" was used for episodes featuring qualifying rounds.

MLB/NFL Sportscaster Chris Rose and former UFC fighter Kenny Florian returned to host for this tenth season, (fifth season of the reboot) of the BattleBots competition on Discovery. Also, arena announcer Faruq Tauheed, and his unique introductions, returned, as well as pit reporter Jenny Taft.

Brand new this season are the "box-side suites", where the builders/teams can get a "bots-eye" look at the action. They have a chance to "scout or shout" for the rest of the field.

Pete Abrahamson (a.k.a. "Bot-Whisperer") joins as a new team member who started competing in the first BattleBots Competition in 1994 with his famous robot, Ronin.

== Judges ==
This season, the judges score on an 11-point scale: 5 points for damage; 3 points for aggression; and 3 points for control.

The current judges are: former BattleBots contenders, Derek Young, Lisa Winter, and Jason Bardis.

== Contestants ==
This season marked the 21st year of the BattleBots competition. The lineup features 62 of the best heavyweight robots to fight head-to-head in the Battle Arena. Their goal is to earn a top 32 ranking and qualify for the post-season where there will be knockout rounds until a winner-take-all fight to crown the 2020 BattleBots World Champion.

In previous seasons, an in-studio audience from the general population was present around the BattleBox to watch the event and add crowd reactions for the broadcast program. Due to COVID-19 pandemic restrictions during the recording of the episodes, the in-studio audience consisted only of the competing teams, with significant separation between the teams.

Contestants

Robot	Builder(s)	Hometown	Fight Record
(Indiana) Aegis	Chris Sparzo	Fishers, IN	0–1 (Note: Fought in less than 3 fights in the regular season, or some of their 3 regular-season fights are unknown.)
(India) Atom #94	Yash Deshmukh	Vadodara, Gujarat, India	0–3
(Florida) Axe Backwards	Kurt Durjan	Palm City, FL	0–2
(California) Axolotl (Note: Participated in untelevised fights)	Alon Belkin	Northridge, CA	0–2
(New Jersey) Bale Spear	Earl B. Pancoast III	Salem, NJ	0–2
(United Kingdom) Beta	Gabriel Stroud & John Reid	Haslemere, England, United Kingdom	3–0
(Washington (state)) Big Dill	Emmanuel Carrillo	Seattle, WA	1–2
(Brazil) Black Dragon	Gabriel Silveira Teles	Itajubá, Minas Gerais, Brazil	2–1
(New York (state)) Black Widow	Herrick Henzel	Newport, New York	0–0
(Massachusetts) Bloodsport	Justin Marple	Somerville, MA	3–0
(California) Bronco (Note: While listed on the official website, this bot did not compete in the actual season (but instead competed in BattleBots: Bounty Hunters).)	Reason Bradley & Alexander Rose	Sausalito, CA	–
(Florida) Captain Shrederator	Brian Nave	Ormond Beach, FL	1–2
(Washington (state)) Chomp	Zoe Stephenson	Seattle, WA	1–2
(California) Chronos	Jerry Serafin	Canoga Park, CA	0–2
(Washington (state)) Claw Viper	Kevin Milczewski	Seattle, WA	1–2
(Colorado) Copperhead	Zach Goff	Loveland, CO	3–0
(Indiana) Deadlift	Ryan Shulski	Indianapolis, IN	1–1
(New Zealand) End Game	Jack Barker	Auckland, New Zealand	2–1
(Florida) Extinguisher	John Flaacke IV	Tampa, FL	1–2
(Wisconsin) Fusion	Reese Ewert	Dorchester, WI	2–1
(California) Gamma 9	Curtis Nemeth	Huntington Beach, CA	0–2
(California) Gemini	Ace Shelander	Santa Monica, CA	0–1
(California) Ghost Raptor	Chuck Pitzer	San Jose, CA	1–2
(California) Gigabyte	John Mladenik	Oceanside, CA	2–1
(Wisconsin) GRABOT	Ben Davidson	Sheboygan, WI	0–2
(Florida) Gruff	Sam McAmis	Holiday, FL	1–2
(California) HiJinx	Jen Herchenroeder	Santa Rosa, CA	2–1
(Connecticut) HUGE	Jonathan Schultz	South Windsor, CT	1–2
(Wisconsin) Hydra	Jake Ewert	Dorchester, WI	3–0
(Florida) HyperShock	Will Bales	Miami, FL	1–2
(California) Icewave	Marc DeVidts	Burlingame, CA	–
(Nevada) JackPot	Jeff Waters	Las Vegas, NV	3–0
(Florida) Kraken	Matt Spurk	Titusville, FL	1–2
(California) Lock-Jaw	Donald Hutson	San Diego, CA	2–1
(California) MadCatter	Martin Mason	Pomona, CA	3–0
(California) Malice	Adrian "Bunny" Sauriol	San Jose, CA	2–1
(Maryland) Mammoth	Ricky Willems	Baltimore, MD	2–1
(New Hampshire) P1	Brandon Zalinsky	Hudson, NH	2–1
(New York (state)) Pain Train	Evan Arias	Staten Island, New York	1–1
(Virginia) Perfect Phoenix	Juli Johnson	Herndon, VA	2–1
(Florida) Rampage	Melaina Knox	Port St. Joe, FL	0–0
(Massachusetts) Ribbot	David Jin	Worcester, MA	2–1
(Florida) Rotator	Victor Soto	Miami, FL	1–2
(Illinois) Rusty	David Eaton	Antioch, IL	1–2
(Massachusetts) SawBlaze	Jamison Go	Cambridge, MA	2–1
(California) Sharko	Edward D. Robinson	Poway, CA	0–2
(New York (state)) Shatter!	Adam Wrigley	Brooklyn, NY	2–1
(California) Skorpios	Zachary Lytle	Moraga, CA	2–1
(Indiana) Slap Box	Bryce Yankauskas	Knox, IN	1–1
(North Carolina) SlamMow!	Craig Danby	Raleigh, NC	2–1
(New York (state)) SMEEEEEEEEEEE	Joe Fabiani	New York City, NY	1–2
(Wisconsin) Son of Whyachi	Luke Ewert	Dorchester, WI	–
(Florida) Sporkinok	Lilith Specht	Orlando, FL	0–2
(Texas) SubZero	Logan Davis	Irving, TX	2–1
(California) Tantrum	Aren Hill	Mountain View, CA	2–1
(California) Tombstone	Ray Billings	Placerville, CA	1–2
(Texas) Tracer	Jason Woods	McKinney, TX; Sacramento, CA	1–2
(Massachusetts) Uppercut	Alex Hattori	Cambridge, MA	2–1
(Massachusetts) Valkyrie	Leanne Cushing	Cambridge, MA	2–1
(Texas) War? EZ!	Jonathan Juarez	Houston, TX	1–2
(California) Whiplash	Matthew Vasquez	Newbury Park, CA	2–1
(Florida) Witch Doctor	Andrea Gellatly (née Suarez)	Miami Springs, FL	1–2

== Seeding ==
1. Hydra (3-0)
2. Bloodsport (3-0)
3. Copperhead (3-0)
4. Uppercut (2-1)
5. Black Dragon (2-1)
6. End Game (2-1)
7. Sawblaze (2-1)
8. Whiplash (2-1)
9. Valkyrie (2-1)
10. Skorpios (2-1)
11. Jackpot (3-0)
12. MadCatter (3-0)
13. Beta (3-0)
14. Lock-Jaw (2-1)
15. Fusion (2-1)
16. Malice (2-1)
17. Gigabyte (2-1)
18. Tantrum (2-1)
19. Shatter! (2-1)
20. Ribbot (2-1)
21. Tombstone (1-2)
22. Rotator (1-2)
23. Witch Doctor (1-2)
24. Subzero (2-1)
25. HUGE (1-2)
26. Kraken (1-2)
27. Perfect Phoenix (2-1)
28. SlamMow! (2-1)
29. HiJinx (2-1)
30. Mammoth (2-1)
31. Gruff (1-2)
32. Hypershock (1-2)

== Knockout stage ==
Round of 32
Battle R32 1
(Wisconsin) #1 Hydra	KO
(Florida) #32 HyperShock
Battle R32 2
(California) #16 Malice
(California) #17 Gigabyte	KO
Battle R32 3
(California) #8 Whiplash	UD
(Connecticut) #25 HUGE
Battle R32 4
(Massachusetts) #9 Valkyrie	KO
(Texas) #24 SubZero
Battle R32 5
(Massachusetts) #4 Uppercut	KO
(California) #29 HiJinx
Battle R32 6
(United Kingdom) #13 Beta
(Massachusetts) #20 Ribbot	KO
Battle R32 7
(Brazil) #5 Black Dragon	KO
(North Carolina) #28 SlamMow!
Battle R32 8
(California) #12 MadCatter
(California) #21 Tombstone	KO
Battle R32 9
(Massachusetts) #2 Bloodsport	SD
(Florida) #31 Gruff
Battle R32 10
(Wisconsin) #15 Fusion
(California) #18 Tantrum	KO
Battle R32 11
(Massachusetts) #7 SawBlaze	UD
(Florida) #26 Kraken
Battle R32 12
(California) #10 Skorpios
(Florida) #23 Witch Doctor	UD
Battle R32 13
(Colorado) #3 Copperhead
(Maryland) #30 Mammoth	SD
Battle R32 14
(California) #14 Lock-Jaw
(New York (state)) #19 Shatter!	KO
Battle R32 15
(New Zealand) #6 End Game	KO
(Virginia) #27 Perfect Phoenix
Battle R32 16
(Nevada) #11 JackPot
(Florida) #22 Rotator	KO

Round of 16
Battle R16 1
(Wisconsin) #1 Hydra	UD
(California) #17 Gigabyte
Battle R16 2
(California) #8 Whiplash	UD
(Massachusetts) #9 Valkyrie
Battle R16 3
(Massachusetts) #4 Uppercut
(Massachusetts) #20 Ribbot	KO
Battle R16 4
(Brazil) #5 Black Dragon	UD
(California) #21 Tombstone
Battle R16 5
(Massachusetts) #2 Bloodsport
(California) #18 Tantrum	SD
Battle R16 6
(Massachusetts) #7 SawBlaze	KO
(Florida) #23 Witch Doctor
Battle R16 7
(Colorado) #30 Mammoth
(New York (state)) #19 Shatter!	SD
Battle R16 8
(New Zealand) #6 End Game	SD
(Florida) #22 Rotator

Quarter-finals
Battle QF1
(Wisconsin) #1 Hydra
(California) #8 Whiplash	SD
Battle QF2
(Massachusetts) #20 Ribbot
(Brazil) #5 Black Dragon	UD
Battle QF3
(California) #18 Tantrum	UD
(Massachusetts) #7 SawBlaze
Battle QF4
(New York (state)) #19 Shatter!
(New Zealand) #6 End Game	KO

Semi-finals
Battle SF1
(California) #8 Whiplash	UD
(Brazil) #5 Black Dragon
Battle SF2
(California) #18 Tantrum
(New Zealand) #6 End Game	KO

Final
Final Battle
(California) #8 Whiplash
(New Zealand) #6 End Game	KO

== Episodes ==
No. overall	No. in season	Title	Original release date	U.S. viewers (millions)
147	1	"Return of the Bots"	December 3, 2020	0.991
The steel-on-steel action, hard-hitting combat of BattleBots: Fight Night returns. The 2020 regular season kicks off as 62 teams from all over the world converge for an all-out tournament. Tonight, Jack Barker with his beloved bot, End Game squares off with Ray Billings with his iconic robot, the fearsome Tombstone. Fight Card: SawBlaze vs. Whiplash; Fusion vs. MadCatter; Malice vs. Axe Backwards; Skorpios vs. Bloodsport; Lock-Jaw vs. Captain Shrederator; Rusty vs. Sporkinok; SMEEEEEEEEEEE vs. Sharkoprion; Main Event: End Game vs. Tombstone. The winners were **SawBlaze** (KO), **MadCatter** (KO), **Malice** (KO), **Bloodsport** (KO), **Lock-Jaw** (KO), **Rusty** (KO), **SMEEEEEEEEEEE** (3-0 UD), and **End Game** (KO)
148	2	"Let the Big Bot Battle Begin"	December 10, 2020	0.906
It's a clash of the titans as the big bots do battle in the box. Four brand new bots make their rookie debut, including an 11-year-old driver. Meanwhile, a "ghostly" legend returns from the past. Also, last year's runner-up begins their season with a match against last year's breakout bot in the main event. Fight Card: Ghost Raptor vs. Shatter!; Tracer vs. Ribbot; Black Dragon vs. Kraken; Mammoth vs. HUGE; Claw Viper vs. HiJinx; Perfect Phoenix vs. Extinguisher; Main Event: Hydra vs. Witch Doctor. The winners were **Shatter!** (KO), **Ribbot** (KO), **Black Dragon** (2-1 SD), **Mammoth** (KO), **Claw Viper** (KO), **Perfect Phoenix** (KO), and **Hydra** (2-1 SD)
149	3	"Stop! Hammer Time!"	December 17, 2020	0.866
It's an all-out battle of veterans and rookie bots alike. A legendary hammer bot makes its return when it goes back in the box with one of the best rotating bots. Also, two top contenders go head-to-head in the electrifying main event for a chance to move up in the rankings. Fight Card: Copperhead vs. Gigabyte; JackPot vs. SubZero; Uppercut vs. Gemini; Beta vs. Rotator; Valkyrie vs. Tantrum; Atom #94 vs. Big Dill; Main Event: Gruff vs. HyperShock. The winners were **Copperhead** (KO), **JackPot** (KO), **Uppercut** (KO), **Beta** (2-1 SD), **Valkyrie** (KO), **Big Dill** (3-0 UD), and **Gruff** (KO)
150	4	"Blood, Sweat and Gears"	December 24, 2020	0.859
It's put up or shut up for the bots that already lost a match. They only have one more chance in the battle box to assert their dominance over their opponents. If they don't, they could be pushed out of the Top 32. A giant bot makes its historic season debut after two years by getting a facelift as a 500-pound 'walker' bot. A frog-bot battles it out with a cat-bot. A fan-favorite takes on a 'bloody' bot in a messy main event. Fight Card: Tombstone vs. Slap Box; Pain Train vs. SlamMow!; Perfect Phoenix vs. Skorpios; Ribbot vs. MadCatter; Chomp vs. Gamma 9; Malice vs. Shatter!; Main Event: End Game vs. Bloodsport. The winners were **Tombstone** (KO), **SlamMow!** (KO), **Skorpios** (KO), **MadCatter** (3-0 UD), **Chomp** (3-0 UD), **Malice** (2-1 SD), and **Bloodsport** (KO)
151	5	"Sin City Slasher"	January 7, 2021	0.832
Some of the biggest named in BattleBots who had their robots turned upside down in the arena by the young gun bots get their chance at redemption. Two legendary bots, Witch-Doctor and Kraken who lost their first matches go bot-to-bot in the Box. Vegas newcomer JackPot rolls the dice against comeback veteran bot Ghost Raptor. Also, flipper bot Hydra has an enormous surprise in store for HUGE in a controversial fight. Fight Card: Black Dragon vs. Claw Viper; Ghost Raptor vs. JackPot; GRABOT vs. SubZero; HUGE vs. Hydra; Aegis vs. Fusion; Big Dill vs. Lock-Jaw; Main Event: Kraken vs Witch Doctor. The winners were **Black Dragon** (KO), **JackPot** (KO), **SubZero** (KO), **Hydra** (3-0 UD), **Fusion** (KO), **Lock-Jaw** (3-0 UD), and **Kraken** (3-0 UD)
152	6	"Battle of the Undefeated"	January 14, 2021	0.910
It's the mid-point of the qualifying round and impressing the selection committee is what it's all about. Sparks fly around the BattleBox as several winless bots go head-to-head. Valkyrie and Rotator square off in a deadly battle of horizontal spinners. Also, surprise winning bots Malice and MadCatter duke it out while MIT grads Uppercut and SawBlaze meet each other in an explosive main event to see who will get their first loss. Fight Card: Rotator vs. Valkyrie; Extinguisher vs. Gigabyte; Slap Box vs. Sharkoprion; Malice vs MadCatter; Atom #94 vs. Tantrum; Pain Train vs. SMEEEEEEEEEEE; Main Event: Uppercut vs. SawBlaze The winners were **Valkyrie** (3-0 UD), **Gigabyte** (KO), **Slap Box** (KO), **MadCatter** (KO), **Tantrum** (KO), **Pain Train** (2-1 SD), and **Uppercut** (KO)
153	7	"Turning Up the Heat"	January 21, 2021	0.763
As BattleBots closes in on the end of the final qualifying rounds, the remaining bots need to impress the selection committee who will soon pick the 32 most-lethal bots to make it into the world championship tournament. A loss by any of these teams could cripple their season. With a few fights left, this is one of these teams' chances to prove they belong among the best bots. Fight Card: Axe Backwards vs. Captain Shrederator; Copperhead vs. P1; Rusty vs. Beta; Mammoth vs. HyperShock; SubZero vs. Sporkinok; Bale Spear vs. Tracer; **Main Event**; Gruff vs. Whiplash The winners were **Captain Shrederator** (KO), **Copperhead** (KO), **Beta** (KO), **HyperShock** (KO), **SubZero** (KO), **Tracer** (KO), and **Whiplash** (3-0 UD) Digital-exclusive fights: (mentioned but unaired in this episode) (winners in bold): **P1** vs. Chronos; **Deadlift** vs. Bale Spear; **HiJinx** vs. Tracer
154	8	"Hit the Jackpot!"	January 28, 2021	0.840
Some of the most notorious bots that have either undefeated or balanced records prepare for their third and final chance to impress the selection committee and do some damage inside the BattleBox as they try to make it into the Top 32 of the world championship tournament. Fight Card: HUGE vs. Kraken; Ribbot vs. Axolotl; Big Dill vs. Rotator; Lock-Jaw vs. Jackpot; Chronos vs. Bloodsport; Fusion vs. War? EZ!; **Main Event**; Skorpios vs. Tombstone The winners were **HUGE** (3-0 UD), **Ribbot** (KO), **Rotator** (KO), **Jackpot** (KO), **Bloodsport** (3-0 UD), **Fusion** (KO), and **Skorpios** (KO) Digital-exclusive fights: (mentioned but unaired in this episode) (winners in bold): **War? EZ!** vs. Axolotl; **SlamMow!** vs. War? EZ!
155	9	"Now or Never"	February 4, 2021	0.849
It's the final round of the qualifiers. Some bots are on the brink of making it to the Top 32 while others it's do or die time in the BattleBox. Will the top teams risk it in order to get a better seed in the tournament? One bad hit could wreak havoc on their season. For the rest, it's playing for pride and letting it all hang out to spoil the best bots' chances, making a statement to impress the selection committee. Fight Card: Captain Shrederator vs. Shatter!; Gigabyte vs. Claw Viper; Chomp vs. HiJinx; Witch Doctor vs. SlamMow!; Extinguisher vs. Gruff; Perfect Phoenix vs. Atom #94; **Main Event**; Copperhead vs. Black Dragon The winners were **Shatter!** (3-0 UD), **Gigabyte** (KO), **HiJinx** (KO), **Witch Doctor** (KO), **Extinguisher** (KO), **Perfect Phoenix** (3-0 UD), and **Copperhead** (3-0 UD) Digital-exclusive fights: (mentioned but unaired in this episode) (winners in bold): **Ghost Raptor** vs. Chomp; (partial showing) **Mammoth** vs Deadlift
156	10	"Qualify! Or Wave Goodbye!"	February 11, 2021	0.766
The tournament qualifiers has reached the end of the line. So it's the last chance for some of the bots to qualify and have an opportunity to influence the selection committee to make it into the Top 32. Plus, seeds will be determined for the BattleBots World Championship bracket. Fight Card: Hydra vs. Uppercut; Rusty vs. SawBlaze; Gamma 9 vs. Tantrum; End Game vs. HyperShock; SMEEEEEEEEEEE vs. P1; Beta vs. Grabot; **Main Event**; Whiplash vs. Valkyrie The winners were **Hydra** (3-0 UD), **SawBlaze** (3-0 UD), **Tantrum** (KO), **End Game** (KO), **P1** (KO), **Beta** (KO), and **Whiplash** (3-0 UD)
157	11	"Survive and Advance"	February 18, 2021	0.828
It's time for the Round of 32 of the World Championship. Low-seeded bots try to punch their ticket into the next round by trying to defeat the top bots. So there's danger in every match as up-and-coming teams look to shake up the tournament bracket. Fight Card: #12 MadCatter vs. #21 Tombstone; #5 Black Dragon vs. #28 SlawMow!; #13 Beta vs. #20 Ribbot; #4 Uppercut vs. #29 HiJinx; #9 Valkyrie vs. #24 SubZero; #8 Whiplash vs. #25 HUGE; #16 Malice vs. #17 Gigabyte; #1 Hydra vs. #32 HyperShock The winners were **Tombstone** (KO, 128 seconds), **Black Dragon** (KO, 128 seconds), **Ribbot** (KO, 70 seconds), **Uppercut** (KO, 33 seconds), **Valkyrie** (KO, 99 seconds), **Whiplash** (3-0 UD), **Gigabyte** (KO, 162 seconds), and **Hydra** (KO, 178 seconds)
158	12	"We're Beast Slayin' Tonight!"	February 25, 2021	0.910
It's win-or-go-home time for the 16 remaining bots as the Round of 32 concludes. The winning teams move onto the Round of 16, and one step closer to the World Championship. Fight Card: #14 Lock-Jaw vs. #19 Shatter!; #11 JackPot vs. #22 Rotator; #6 End Game vs. #27 Perfect Phoenix; #3 Copperhead vs. #30 Mammoth; #7 SawBlaze vs. #26 Kraken; #2 Bloodsport vs. #31 Gruff; #15 Fusion vs. #18 Tantrum; #10 Skorpios vs. #23 Witch Doctor The winners were **Shatter!** (KO, 119 seconds), **Rotator** (KO, 88 seconds), **End Game** (KO, 57 seconds), **Mammoth** (2-1 SD), **SawBlaze** (3-0 UD), **Bloodsport** (2-1 SD), **Tantrum** (KO, 150 seconds), and **Witch Doctor** (3-0 UD)
159	13	"Shock and Awe"	March 4, 2021	0.892
The Round of 16 begins. Sixteen bots will battle it out to move even closer in the tournament. Eight winning teams will have two more fights left while eight losing teams will have their chance at earning the Giant Nut die in the BattleBox. Fight Card: #7 SawBlaze vs. #23 Witch Doctor; #4 Uppercut vs. #20 Ribbot; #2 Bloodsport vs. #18 Tantrum; #1 Hydra vs. #17 Gigabyte; #5 Black Dragon vs. #21 Tombstone; #8 Whiplash vs. #9 Valkyrie; #19 Shatter! vs. #30 Mammoth; #6 End Game vs. #22 Rotator The winners were **SawBlaze** (KO, 179 seconds), **Ribbot** (KO, 94 seconds), **Tantrum** (2-1 SD), **Hydra** (3-0 UD), **Black Dragon** (3-0 UD), **Whiplash** (3-0 UD), **Shatter!** (2-1 SD), **End Game** (2-1 SD)
160	14	"The World Championship Finals"	March 11, 2021	0.949
The BattleBots World Championship Tournament has reached the end as the remaining eight bots battle it out in the Battle Box. Only one team will hoist the Giant Nut trophy and be crowned champions. Quarter Finals: #20 Ribbot vs. #5 Black Dragon; #19 Shatter! vs. #6 End Game; #18 Tantrum vs. #7 SawBlaze; #1 Hydra vs. #8 Whiplash. Semi-Finals: #18 Tantrum vs. #6 End Game; #5 Black Dragon vs. #8 Whiplash. Finals: #8 Whiplash vs. #6 End Game The quarter final winners were **Black Dragon** (3-0 UD), **End Game** (KO, 117 seconds), **Tantrum** (3-0 UD), and **Whiplash** (2-1 SD). The semi-final winners were **End Game** (KO, 176 seconds) and **Whiplash** (3-0 UD). The Giant Bolt Award winners were **Valkyrie** (Most Destructive), **Skorpios** (Founders Award), **Rusty** (Best Newcomer), and **Chomp** (Grant Imahara Award) (Best Design). The 2020 BattleBots World Champion is **End Game** (KO, 110 seconds). Note: this episode was dedicated to Grant Imahara, a former BattleBots contestant and guest judge, and Gayle Garner Roski, BattleBots' first sponsor; both of whom died in 2020.
