= BattleBots season 11 =

BattleBots
- Season 11
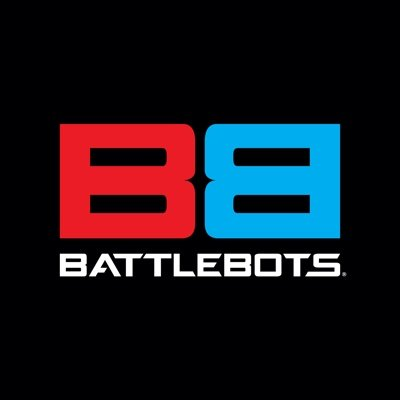
- No. of episodes: 14

Release
- Original network: Discovery; Science
- Original release: January 6 – April 7, 2022

Season chronology
- ← Previous; Season 10 Next → Season 12

The eleventh season of the American competitive television series BattleBots premiered on Discovery Channel on January 6, 2022. This is the fourth season of Battlebots to premiere on Discovery Channel and the sixth season since the show was rebooted in 2015. The show continued to use their modified logo, with a pair of "B"'s, making a "BB" logo atop the term "BATTLEBOTS", as well as the subtitle, "Fight Night" for qualifying rounds.

MLB/NFL Sportscaster Chris Rose and former UFC fighter Kenny Florian return to host for the eleventh season, as well as arena announcer Faruq Tauheed and "Bot Whisperer" Pete Abrahamson.

Brand new this season, in the ever evolving sport of combat robotics, the BattleBox changes with the inclusion of an "upper deck", complete with its own set of spinning saw blades, totally adds new geometry angles to the playing surface.

Also new for this season, BattleBots has changed locations from Los Angeles, California, to Las Vegas, Nevada, now known as "The Fight Capital of the World".

== Filming ==
The matches took place between Monday, August 23, 2021, culminating on September 4, 2021. Qualifying fights took place on August 23, 24, 27, and 28, with two fight cards each day from 12 pm-4 pm and 6 pm-10 pm. Tournament rounds took place on August 29 and 31, and September 2, 3, and 4. As with the qualifying rounds, there were two rounds of fights each day at the same times as the qualifiers.

Caesars Entertainment Studios, at 4165 Koval Lane, was the new venue for the battlebox and the pits. Previously, competitions had taken place in the former Boeing Post 52 building at the Long Beach Airport.

== Judges ==
This season, the judges score on an 11-point scale: 5 points for damage; 3 points for aggression; and 3 points for control.

The current judges are: former BattleBots contenders, Derek Young, Lisa Winter, and Jason Bardis.

== Contestants ==
This season marked the 22nd year of the BattleBots competition. The lineup features 62 of the best heavyweight robots to fight head-to-head in the Battle Arena.

Every team will fight up to three times in the qualifying rounds. Their goal is to earn a spot in the top 32 in the winner-take-all championship tournament and ultimately become the 2021 BattleBots World Champion.

Host City (Las Vegas, Nevada)

Contestants

Robot	Builder(s)	Hometown	Fight Record
(Washington (state)) Big Dill	Emmanuel Carrillo	Seattle, WA	–‡
(Brazil) Black Dragon	Gabriel Gomes	Itajubá, Minas Gerais, Brazil	2–1
(New Jersey) Blacksmith	Al Kindle	Edison, NJ	1–2
(California) Blip	Aren Hill	Mountain View, CA	3–0
(Massachusetts) Bloodsport	Justin Marple	Somerville, MA	2–1
(Florida) Captain Shrederator*	Brian Nave	Ormond Beach, FL	2–1
(Washington (state)) Claw Viper*	Kevin Milczewski	Seattle, WA	1–2
(United Kingdom) Cobalt	John Mladenik	Oceanside, CA	2–1
(Colorado) Copperhead	Robert Cowan	Erie, CO	2–0
(Indiana) Deadlift*	Ryan Shulski	Indianapolis, IN	0–2
(Virginia) Deep Six*	Dustin Esswein	Norfolk, VA	1–2
(California) Defender*	Jason Vasquez	Thousand Oaks, CA	2–1
(California) Double Jeopardy	Evan Woolley	Irvine, CA	–‡
(Texas) Dragon Slayer	Jordan Neal	Denton, TX	1–2
(California) DUCK!	Hal Rucker	Palo Alto, CA	0–3
(New Zealand) End Game	Jack Barker	Auckland, New Zealand	3–0
(California) Free Shipping	Gary Gin	San Leandro, CA	0–3
(Wisconsin) Fusion	Reese Ewert	Dorchester, WI	1–2
(California) Ghost Raptor	Chuck Pitzer	San Jose, CA	0–2
(California) Gigabyte	John Mladenik	Oceanside, CA	2–1
(California) Glitch	Kyle Miller	Roseville, CA	3–0
(Florida) Gruff	Sam McAmis	Holiday, FL	1–2
(California) HiJinx	Jen Herchenroeder	Santa Rosa, CA	2–1
(Connecticut) HUGE	Jonathan Schultz	South Windsor, CT	2–1
(Wisconsin) Hydra	Jake Ewert	Dorchester, WI	1–2
(Florida) HyperShock	Will Bales	Miami, FL	2–0
(California) Icewave	Marc DeVidts	Burlingame, CA	2–1
(Nevada) JackPot*	Jeff Waters	Las Vegas, NV	2–0
(Germany) Jäger*	Ralf Schneider	Gemünden am Main, Germany	0–2
(Florida) Kraken	Matt Spurk	Titusville, FL	0–3
(California) Lock-Jaw	Donald Hutson	San Diego, CA	0–3
(Canada) Lucky	Mark Demers	Ottawa, Ontario, Canada	2–1
(California) MadCatter	Martin Mason	Pomona, CA	2–1

Robot	Builder(s)	Hometown	Fight Record
(California) Malice	Adrian "Bunny" Sauriol	San Jose, CA	1–2
(Maryland) Mammoth	Ricky Willems	Baltimore, MD	1–2
(Brazil) Minotaur	Marco Antonio Meggiolaro	Rio de Janeiro, Brazil	2–1
(South Korea) ORBY Blade	Cheog Gyu Hwang	Seoul, South Korea	1–2
(Georgia (U.S. state)) Overhaul	Charles Guan	Atlanta, GA	0–2
(New Hampshire) P1	Brandon Zalinsky	Hudson, NH	2–1
(New York (state)) Pain Train	Evan Arias	Staten Island, New York	0–2
(Canada) Pardon My French*	Philippe Voyer	Rivière-du-Loup, Quebec, Canada	0–2
(Virginia) Perfect Phoenix	Tyler Nguyen	Herndon, VA	–‡
(Florida) Rampage*	Melaina Knox	Port St. Joe, FL	0–2
(California) Retrograde*	Aaron Lucas	Venice, CA	1–2
(Massachusetts) Ribbot	David Jin	Worcester, MA	3–0
(California) Riptide	Ethan Kurtz	Tarzana, CA	2–1
(Florida) Rotator	Victor Soto	Miami, FL	2–0
(Illinois) Rusty	David Eaton	Antioch, IL	0–2
(Massachusetts) SawBlaze	Jamison Go	Cambridge, MA	2–1
(New York (state)) Shatter!*	Adam Wrigley	Brooklyn, NY	2–0
(California) Skorpios	Zachary Lytle	Moraga, CA	1–2
(North Carolina) Slammo!*	Craig Danby	Raleigh, NC	0–2
(New York (state)) SMEEEEEEEEEEE*	Joe Fabiani	New York City, NY	1–1
(Texas) SubZero*	Logan Davis	Irving, TX	0–3
(Texas) Switchback*	Greg Needel	Dallas, TX	1–2
(California) Tantrum	Alex Grant & Ginger Schmidt	Mountain View, CA	2–0
(California) Tombstone	Ray Billings	Placerville, CA	2–1
(California) Triple Crown*	Todd Mendenhall	Rancho Palos Verdes, CA	0–1
(Massachusetts) Uppercut	Alex Hattori	Cambridge, MA	2–0
(Massachusetts) Valkyrie*	Leanne Cushing	Cambridge, MA	2–1
(California) Whiplash	Matthew Vasquez	Newbury Park, CA	2–0
(Florida) Witch Doctor	Andrea Gellatly (née Suarez)	Miami Springs, FL	2–1
(Alaska) Yeti	Greg Gibson & Christian Carlberg	San Luis Obispo, CA	2–1

* These bots participated in untelevised fights aired as YouTube exclusives.

== Seeding ==
1. End Game (3-0)
2. Ribbot (3-0)
3. Whiplash (2-0)
4. Sawblaze (2-1)
5. Uppercut (2-0)
6. Rotator (2-0)
7. Blip (3-0)
8. Copperhead (2-0)
9. Mammoth (1-2) * In replacement For Glitch
10. Jackpot (2-0) (Home Team)
11. Tantrum (2-0)
12. Shatter! (2-0)
13. Hypershock (2-0)
14. Cobalt (2-1)
15. Madcatter (2-1)
16. Minotaur (2-1)
17. Bloodsport (2-1)
18. Black Dragon(2-1)
19. Yeti (2-1)
20. P1 (2-1)
21. Riptide (2-1)
22. Gigabyte (2-1)
23. Tombstone (2-1)
24. Witch Doctor (2-1)
25. Lucky (2-1)
26. Valkyrie (2-1)
27. Captain Shrederator (2-1)
28. HUGE (2-1)
29. HiJinx (2-1)
30. Icewave (2-1)
31. Hydra (1-2) vs. Defender (2-1)
32. Skorpios (1-2) vs. Malice (1-2)

== Tournament bracket ==
=== Knockout stage ===
Round of 32
(New Zealand) #1 EndGame	KO
(California) #32 Skorpios
(Brazil) #16 Minotaur	UD
(Massachusetts) #17 BloodSport
(Colorado) #8 Copperhead	KO
(Canada) #25 Lucky
(Maryland) Mammoth (Replacement for # 9 Glitch)*
(Florida) #24 Witch Doctor	KO
(Massachusetts) #4 SawBlaze	UD
(California) #29 HiJinx
(Florida) #13 HyperShock
(New Hampshire) #20 P1	UD
(Massachusetts) #5 Uppercut	UD
(Connecticut) #28 HUGE
(New York (state)) #12 Shatter!
(California) #21 Riptide	KO
(Massachusetts) #2 Ribbot
(Wisconsin) #31 Hydra	KO
(California) #15 Madcatter
(Brazil) #18 Black Dragon	SD
(California) #7 Blip	KO
(Massachusetts) #26 Valkyrie
(Nevada) #10 JackPot (Home Team)	KO
(California) #23 Tombstone
(California) #3 Whiplash	KO
(California) #30 Icewave
(United Kingdom) #14 Cobalt	KO
(Alaska) #19 Yeti
(Florida) #6 Rotator	KO
(Florida) #27 Captain Shrederator
(California) #11 Tantrum	UD
(California) #22 Gigabyte

Round of 16
(New Zealand) #1 End Game
(Brazil) #16 Minotaur	UD
(Colorado) #8 Copperhead
(Florida) #24 Witch Doctor	KO
(Massachusetts) #4 SawBlaze	UD
(New Hampshire) #20 P1
(Massachusetts) #5 Uppercut
(California) #21 Riptide	KO
(Wisconsin) #31 Hydra	KO
(Brazil) #18 Black Dragon
(California) #7 Blip	KO
(Nevada) #10 JackPot (Home Team)
(California) #3 Whiplash
(United Kingdom) #14 Cobalt	UD
(Florida) #6 Rotator
(California) #11 Tantrum	KO

Quarter-finals
(Brazil) #16 Minotaur
(Florida) #24 Witch Doctor	UD
(Massachusetts) #4 SawBlaze	KO
(California) #21 Riptide
(Wisconsin) #31 Hydra	KO
(California) #7 Blip
(United Kingdom) #14 Cobalt
(California) #11 Tantrum	KO

Semi-finals
(Florida) #24 Witch Doctor	KO
(Massachusetts) #4 SawBlaze
(Wisconsin) #31 Hydra
(California) #11 Tantrum	SD

Final
(Florida) #24 Witch Doctor
(California) #11 Tantrum	KO

==== Notes ====
'* Glitch was the #9 seed set to fight Witch Doctor but had to withdraw due to mechanical issues.

== Episodes ==
No. overall	No. in season	Title	Original release date	U.S. viewers (millions)
161	1	"Slash and Burn!"	January 6, 2022	0.954
BattleBots enters a new stage of evolution with a major change in the BattleBox and a move to Las Vegas. Top robot teams from all over the world return to compete in the 11th season of "robot fighting time" for a chance to win the Giant Nut. Two O.G. bot builders begin with their first meeting. A rookie team with a 'switch' weapon makes their debut, and the first BattleBots international champs face-off with the deadliest flipper bot. Fight Card: Sawblaze vs. Minotaur; Uppercut vs. Gigabyte; Switchback vs. Gruff; Captain Shrederator vs. Tombstone; Free Shipping vs. Blacksmith; Pain Train vs. Deep Six; Main Event: Hydra vs. End Game; YouTube exclusive: Deadlift vs. JackPot The winners were SawBlaze (UD), Uppercut (KO), Gruff (KO), Captain Shrederator (KO), Blacksmith (UD), Deep Six (KO), and End Game (KO). The winner of the YouTube exclusive was JackPot (UD)
162	2	"I Like Big Bots (That Will Not Die)"	January 13, 2022	0.819
It's week two of BattleBots with 14 bots enter the arena to do even more damage in Sin City. An Alpine legend comes out of retirement to rumble with the "gritty kitty". A clash of the titans match between an improved Mammoth and the biggest horizontal spinner bot. The "little junkyard bot that could" fights in its sophomore season versus the first flex-wheel flipper bot. And a bloody bot tries to carve up last year's runner-up. Fight Card: Yeti vs. MadCatter; Defender vs. Ribbot; HiJinx vs. Mammoth; Rotator vs. Kraken; Blip vs. Rusty; Tantrum vs. Malice; Main Event: Bloodsport vs. Whiplash; YouTube exclusive: SubZero vs. Shatter The winners were MadCatter (KO), Ribbot (KO), Mammoth (KO), Rotator (UD), Blip (KO), Tantrum (UD), and Whiplash (KO). The winner of the YouTube exclusive was Shatter (UD)
163	3	"Ducks, Dragons, Killer Snakes – What a Zoo!"	January 20, 2022	0.820
More killer bots make their season debut in Las Vegas' new BattleBox. The "serrated slasher", Cobalt makes its return, as well as veterans Duck! and Icewave after years of not competing. While last season's most destructive bot, Valkyrie, the Brazilian beast, Black Dragon, and fan-favorite voodoo bot, Witch Doctor all must prove they are the best of the heaviest hitters. Fight Card: HyperShock vs. Slammo!; Valkyrie vs. P1; HUGE vs. Riptide; Fusion vs. Cobalt; Black Dragon vs. Icewave; Witch Doctor vs. DUCK!; Main Event: Copperhead vs. Lock-Jaw; YouTube exclusive: Claw Viper vs. Pardon My French The winners were HyperShock (KO), P1 (UD), Riptide (KO), Fusion (KO), Black Dragon (KO), Witch Doctor (UD), and Copperhead (SD). The winner of the YouTube exclusive was Claw Viper (KO)
164	4	"Out With the Old"	January 27, 2022	0.814
Five of the seven match-ups feature teams who are looking to jump to a perfect start with a 2–0 record, while a couple of returning bots make it back into the BattleBox for the first time in years. Other bots seek redemption from their first fights losses. And two rookies make their BattleBots debuts against some seasoned veterans. Fight card: Malice vs. JackPot; Ribbot vs. Overhaul; Blade vs. Skorpios; Tombstone vs. Mammoth; Lucky vs. Tantrum; Ghost Raptor vs. Glitch; Main Event: SawBlaze vs. MadCatter; YouTube exclusive: Retrograde vs. Rampage The winners were JackPot (KO), Ribbot (KO), Skorpios (UD), Tombstone (UD), Tantrum (KO), Glitch (UD), and SawBlaze (KO). The winner of the YouTube exclusive was Retrograde (KO)
165	5	"Let's Uppercut to the Chase!"	February 3, 2022	0.882
A hand-ful of teams are already facing the prospect of becoming winless and try to avoid an 0-and-2 start. The number one flipper takes on an indestructible flaming bot. Then it's the battle of the full-body spinner bots. Two rookies make their debut; one a multi-bot and the other a "slayer" bot. In the main event, last year's champion goes up against the fan-favorite bot with one of the most violent weapons that was the runner-up two seasons ago. Fight Card: Free Shipping vs. Uppercut; Blacksmith vs. Shatter!; Jäger vs. P1; Hydra vs. Gruff; Gigabyte vs. Captain Shrederator; Dragon Slayer vs. Duck!; Main Event: End Game vs. Witch Doctor; YouTube exclusive: Valkyrie vs. Triple Crown The winners were Uppercut (KO), Shatter! (UD), P1 (KO), Hydra (KO), Gigabyte (KO), Dragon Slayer (UD), and End Game (KO). The winner of the YouTube exclusive was Valkyrie (KO)
166	6	"Bigger Than Bots"	February 10, 2022	0.649
The second half of the World Championship qualifiers begin. Teams with a record of 0–1 or 1–0 face-off for the prospect of a slot in the final 32 of the tournament. Perhaps a bit early for that, but many perennial favorites fight for their BattleBots life. Fight Card: Rotator vs. Black Dragon; Lucky vs. Blade; Dragon Slayer vs. Minotaur; Pain Train vs. Yeti; HiJinx vs. Kraken; Defender vs. Riptide; Main Event: HyperShock vs. Lock-Jaw; YouTube exclusive: Deep Six vs. SMEEEEEEEEEEE The winners were Rotator (UD), Lucky (KO), Minotaur (KO), Yeti (KO), Hijinx (UD), Defender (UD), and HyperShock (KO). The winner of the YouTube exclusive was SMEEEEEEEEEEE (KO)
167	7	"Edges, Wedges and Wheels"	February 17, 2022	0.660
Another group of 1–0 bots look to separate themselves from the rest of pack in the qualifiers. Two of the best bot drivers square-off against each other in Main Event. Fight Card: Bloodsport vs. SubZero; Cobalt vs. Ghost Raptor; Icewave vs. Deadlift; Blip vs. Overhaul; HUGE vs. Retrograde; Copperhead vs. Fusion; Main Event: Whiplash vs. Skorpios; YouTube exclusive: Switchback vs. Slammo! The winners were Bloodsport (KO), Cobalt (KO), Icewave (KO), Blip (KO), HUGE (KO), Copperhead (KO), and Whiplash (SD). The winner of the YouTube exclusive was Switchback (KO)
168	8	"Flip the Script"	February 24, 2022	0.739
Shocking upsets shake up the entire competition. And with the World Championship looming, it's the last chance for many teams to make a statement that they belong in the Round of 64. Fight Card: Malice vs. Blacksmith; Black Dragon vs. Claw Viper; Gigabyte vs. SMEEEEEEEEEEEEE; Glitch vs. Hydra; Tombstone vs. Free Shipping; Ribbot vs. P1, Main Event: End Game vs. SawBlaze; YouTube exclusive: Captain Shrederator vs. Jäger The winners were Malice (UD), Black Dragon (KO), Gigabyte (KO), Glitch (KO), Tombstone (UD), Ribbot (KO), and End Game (KO). The winner of the YouTube exclusive was Captain Shrederator (KO)
169	9	"Put Up or Shut Up"	March 3, 2022	0.692
The penultimate week of the qualifying round has fourteen of the field’s most destructive bots vying for a kick at The Giant Nut! In a tactically tantalizing Main Event two of the most aggressive drivers duke it out in a clash between Skorpios and Yeti! Fight Card: Gruff vs. Cobalt; DUCK! vs. Riptide; Valkyrie vs. Pardon My French; Lock-Jaw vs. Blip; Minotaur vs. Deep Six; SubZero vs. HiJinx, Main Event: Yeti vs. Skorpios; YouTube exclusive: Defender vs. Retrograde The winners were Cobalt (KO), Riptide (KO), Valkyrie (KO), Blip (UD), Minotaur (KO), HiJinx (KO), and Yeti (SD). The winner of the YouTube exclusive was Defender (UD)
170	10	"To The Victor, Go the Spoils"	March 10, 2022	0.748
It's the Selection Show! The Qualifying Rounds wrap up with 7 must-win matchups, as many fan faves try to secure a spot in the World Championship Tournament. At the end of the night, the field for the Round of 32 is revealed. Fight Card: Bloodsport vs. Claw Viper; MadCatter vs. Rampage; HUGE vs. Switchback; Kraken vs. Glitch; Mammoth vs. Lucky; Rusty vs. Witch Doctor, Main Event: Fusion vs. Icewave; YouTube exclusive: Blade vs. Dragon Slayer The winners were Bloodsport (UD), MadCatter (KO), HUGE (KO), Glitch (KO), Lucky (KO), Witch Doctor (KO), and Icewave (KO). The winner of the YouTube exclusive was Blade (KO)
171	11	"Let the Tournament Begin!"	March 17, 2022	0.725
The World Championship Tournament has arrived! Only one team will hoist the most coveted trophy in the sport, the Giant Nut. The defending champions, End Game, are ready to defend their crown, but a stacked group of contenders aren't backing down. Fight Card: #12 Shatter! vs. #21 Riptide; #13 Hypershock vs. #20 P1; #32 Skorpios vs. #32 Malice; #16 Minotaur vs. #17 Bloodsport; #4 SawBlaze vs. #29 HiJinx; #24 Witch Doctor vs. #9 Mammoth; #32 Skorpios vs. #1 End Game; YouTube exclusives: #5 Uppercut vs. #28 HUGE; #8 Copperhead vs. #25 Lucky The winners were Riptide (KO, 69 seconds), P1 (UD), Skorpios (UD), Minotaur (UD), SawBlaze (UD), Witch Doctor (KO, 53 seconds), and End Game (KO, 57 seconds). The winners of the YouTube exclusives were Uppercut (UD) and Copperhead (UD)
172	12	"8 Down, 8 to Go"	March 24, 2022	0.745
It's all on the line for 16 killer bots as the round of 32 concludes. Spinners, lifters and flippers battle for survival in their quest for the ultimate prize: the Giant Nut! Fight Card: #31 Defender vs. #31 Hydra; #14 Cobalt vs. #19 Yeti; #10 Jackpot vs. #23 Tombstone; #15 MadCatter vs. #18 Black Dragon; #7 Blip vs. #26 Valkyrie; #11 Tantrum vs. #22 Gigabyte; #2 Ribbot vs. #31 Hydra; YouTube exclusives: #3 Whiplash vs. #30 Icewave; #27 Captain Shrederator vs. #6 Rotator The winners were Hydra (KO, 129 seconds), Cobalt (KO, 93 seconds), Jackpot (KO, 40 seconds), Black Dragon (SD), Blip (KO, 174 seconds), Tantrum (UD), and Hydra (KO, 124 seconds). The winners of the YouTube exclusives were Whiplash (KO, 58 seconds) and Rotator (KO, 76 seconds)
173	13	"Round of 16"	March 31, 2022	0.789
The march towards The Giant Nut rages on as the final 16 bots fight for survival! The best of the best are left, but only eight will survive tonight to face the ultimate conflict. Fight Card: #21 Riptide vs. #5 Uppercut; #11 Tantrum vs. #6 Rotator; #7 Blip vs. #10 JackPot; #31 Hydra vs. #18 Black Dragon; #24 Witch Doctor vs. #8 Copperhead; #20 P1 vs. #4 SawBlaze; #3 Whiplash vs. #14 Cobalt; and #16 Minotaur vs. #1 End Game The winners were Riptide (KO, 69 seconds), Tantrum (KO, 179 seconds), Blip (KO, 62 seconds), Hydra (UD), Witch Doctor (KO, 60 seconds), SawBlaze (UD), Cobalt (SD) and Minotaur (UD)
174	14	"Battlebots: The Finals"	April 7, 2022	0.769
By the end of tonight's season finale, a new team will hoist the Giant Nut and be crowned BattleBots World Champion. It's winner takes all, as the final eight bots face off in the ultimate robotic fight to the death. Fight Card (quarter finals): #21 Riptide vs. #4 SawBlaze; #14 Cobalt vs. #11 Tantrum; #7 Blip vs. #31 Hydra; #24 Witch Doctor vs. #16 Minotaur. (semifinals): #31 Hydra vs. #11 Tantrum; #4 SawBlaze vs. #24 Witch Doctor. (Final) #24 Witch Doctor vs. #11 Tantrum. The winners of the quarter-finals were SawBlaze (KO, 98 seconds), Tantrum (KO, 95 seconds), Hydra (KO, 63 seconds), and Witch Doctor (UD). The winners of the semi-finals were Tantrum (SD) and Witch Doctor (KO, 65 seconds). The Giant Bolt Award winners were Hypershock (Most Destructive), SawBlaze (Founders Award), Glitch & Riptide (Best Newcomer), and Blip (Grant Imahara Award) (Best Design). The 2022 BattleBots World Champion is Tantrum (KO, 173 seconds).
