= BattleBots =

American robot combat television series

- Also known as: Comedy Central Sports Presents: BattleBots (seasons 1–5)
- Genre: Robot competition
- Created by: Greg Munson; Trey Roski
- Directed by: Dan McDowell; Ryan Polito
- Presented by: Tim Green; Sean Salisbury; Bil Dwyer; Molly McGrath; Samantha Ponder; Chris Rose; Kenny Florian
- Starring: Mark Beiro; Bill Nye; Donna D'Errico; Traci Bingham; Randy Sklar; Jason Sklar; Heidi Mark; Arj Barker; Brad Wollack; Carmen Electra; Tony Rock; Alison Haislip; Faruq Tauheed; Jessica Chobot; Jenny Taft
- Narrated by: Chris Rose; Kenny Florian
- Composer: Vanacore Music
- Country of origin: United States
- Original language: English
- No. of seasons: 12
- No. of episodes: 191 (list of episodes)

Production
- Executive producers: Mack Anderson; Bradley Anderson; Debbie Liebling; Lloyd Braun; Chris Cowan; Trey Roski; Greg Munson; Aaron Catling
- Editor: Jonathan Siegel
- Running time: 30–60 minutes
- Production companies: Whalerock Industries; BattleBots Productions

Original release
- Network: Comedy Central
- Release: August 23, 2000 – December 21, 2002
- Network: ABC
- Release: June 21, 2015 – September 1, 2016
- Network: Discovery Channel
- Release: May 11, 2018 – May 25, 2023

Related
- BattleBots: Bounty Hunters

BattleBots is an American robot combat television series and company. BattleBots is a series of competitions in which competitors design and operate remote-controlled armed and armored machines designed to fight in an arena combat elimination tournament. As a show, BattleBots aired for five seasons on Comedy Central (2000–2002), returning with two seasons on ABC (2015–2016) and five more on Discovery Channel (2018–2023), in addition to several spin-offs.

BattleBots was inspired by untelevised American Robot Wars competitions (1994–1997), created by Marc Thorpe. Thorpe's competitions also inspired the British TV program Robot Wars (1998–2004, 2016–2018), which acquired the name's television rights in 1995. Starting in 1997, Marc Thorpe's ability to continue his Robot Wars competitions came under legal threat from his former sponsor. In response, competitors Greg Munson and Trey Roski put together a new company, BattleBots, as an unofficial continuation of the American competitions. The first official BattleBots event was hosted at the Long Beach Pyramid in Long Beach, California, in August 1999, while a second event in Las Vegas was used to pitch the competition to television networks.

For five seasons, BattleBots aired on the American Comedy Central and was hosted by Bil Dwyer, Sean Salisbury, and Tim Green. Comedy Central's first season premiered on August 23, 2000, and its fifth and last season ended on December 21, 2002. While small untelevised competitions continued to be run under the BattleBots name since 2002, the show was on hiatus until it was revived on ABC in 2015.

A six-episode revival series premiered on ABC on June 21, 2015, to generally favorable reviews and ratings. Additionally, ABC renewed BattleBots for a seventh season, which premiered on June 23, 2016. In February 2018, Discovery Channel and Science picked up the show for an eighth season, which premiered on May 11, 2018. A ninth season of BattleBots premiered on Discovery Channel on June 7, 2019, the tenth season premiered on December 3, 2020, the eleventh season on January 6, 2022, and the twelfth season on January 5, 2023.

Two spin-off competitions have debuted on Discovery+. The first spin-off, BattleBots: Bounty Hunters, premiered on January 4, 2021, on Discovery+. A second spin-off premiered on August 5, 2022, under the name BattleBots: Champions. BattleBots: Pro League, a 20-episode competition, began airing on YouTube in July 2026, with international distribution planned for 2027.

== History ==
=== Early competitions ===
BattleBots is an offshoot of the original Robot Wars tournaments, the brainchild of Marc Thorpe. Robot Wars had financial backing from Sm:)e communications, a New York record company. The Thorpe partnership broke up in 1997, starting many years of legal wrangling between Thorpe and Profile Records (the former Sm:)e Communications). Profile licensed Robot Wars to Mentorn, a UK television production company. Mentorn's Robot Wars ran from 1998 to 2004 as a popular television program in the UK, with a short-lived revival from 2016 to 2017.

The robot builders left behind in San Francisco formed BattleBots, Inc. and began a series of larger competitions. The first was held in Long Beach, California in August 1999 and streamed online, attracting 40,000 streams. Lenny Stucker, a television producer known for his work on telecasts of professional boxing, was in attendance and showed interest in being involved with BattleBots—believing the concept of robot combat was "hip" and have shown an interest in technology. Stucker made changes to the competition's format and presentation to make it more suitable for television, including elements reminiscent of boxing (such as a red and blue corner) and shifting to a single-elimination format. The creators tried selling the competition as a television series to networks such as CBS, NBC, HBO, and Showtime, but none picked it up. A second event was held as a pay-per-view in Las Vegas in 1999, the PPV was in turn, used as a pilot to pitch the show again, with a higher rate of success.

=== Comedy Central seasons (2000–2002) ===
Among the networks interested was Comedy Central, who ultimately picked up the program. Debbie Liebling, the network's Senior Vice President of original programming and development, felt that the concept would appeal to the network's young adult demographic, explaining that "it was really funny and really nerdy. The Internet was not a big thing yet, so the nerd culture wasn't so celebrated. It was sports for the nerdy person, I guess." Co-creator Greg Munson viewed the deal as a double-edged sword; it gave BattleBots an outlet and a larger budget, but the network insisted on the addition of comedic aspects to BattleBots as a program, such as sketches involving contestants. However, the competition itself was not affected by this mandate; Liebling described the final product as being "a parody of a sports show without being a parody". Munson lamented that the network had also ignored his suggestion for the co-host role to be filled by "attractive geek girls" with sufficient knowledge to speak with builders, having elected to "[keep] throwing bigger and better hot babes at it", such as Carmen Electra.

Despite this, viewership and awareness of BattleBots grew progressively over time; contestants Christian Carlberg and Lisa Winter were invited to appear on The Tonight Show with Jay Leno, BattleBots beat South Park as Comedy Central's highest-rated program for a period during Season 3, competitor interest grew and licensing deals also emerged. The success of BattleBots, however, resulted in competition from other broadcasters; TLC introduced a competing program, Robotica, while other channels imported episodes of the British Robot Wars series. By 2002, the program had begun to face further difficulties; Munson felt that the bouts had become "homogenized" because the participants had "perfected" the sport of robot fighting, leading to a lack of innovation in robot designs and strategies. Furthermore, BattleBots had sued Anheuser-Busch and its advertising agency for producing and airing a commercial during Super Bowl XXXVII that parodied the program and featured a robot greatly resembling one from BattleBots (this lawsuit, however, was dismissed in 2004, after a judge ruled that the ad was a parody protected by fair use). In September 2002, Comedy Central cancelled BattleBots after its fifth season, BattleBots 5.0. Viacom acquired full control of the network in April 2003; Stucker believed that Comedy Central had become "tired" of the program, and Roski stated that Viacom had wanted to shift Comedy Central back towards traditional comedy programming.

=== ABC/Discovery Channel revival (2015–2023) ===
In December 2014, ABC announced that it had picked up a six-episode revival of BattleBots, produced by Whalerock Industries, to premiere in June 2015. Roski and Munson served as executive producers, joined by Lloyd Braun. The 2015 revival drew an average viewership of 5.4 million in its Sunday-night timeslot, with a 1.9 share in the 18-49 demographic. In November 2015, ABC announced that it had renewed the BattleBots revival for the seventh overall season of the series. The 2016 competition expanded to a 56-team field.

After ABC declined to renew the revival for a subsequent season, the series was picked up by Discovery Channel and sister network Science. In April 2018, the networks announced that a new season would premiere that year: May 11 on Discovery and May 16 on Science Channel. The announcement reported that among the returning bots would be favorites Tombstone, Minotaur, Chomp, Witch Doctor, Bronco, Bombshell, Bite Force, and Yeti. Chris Rose and Kenny Florian return to call the action, provide background information about the bots and teams, and offer commentary. Jessica Chobot served again as the sideline reporter. Faruq Tauheed returned as the ring announcer.

BattleBots returned for another season on June 5, 2019, on Discovery and Science Channel. Chris Rose and Kenny Florian returned as hosts with a new sideline reporter, Jenny Taft, interviewing all of the BattleBots competitors in the workshop. The COVID-19 pandemic delayed the tenth-season premiere on Discovery, planned for May 2020. Filming finally occurred October 10–21 for the season 10 premiere on December 3, 2020. An eleventh season ran from January 6 to April 7, 2022, establishing a permanent base for production at Caesars Entertainment Studios in Las Vegas. A twelfth season—marketed as "World Championship VII"—ran from January 5 to May 25, 2023.

=== Other untelevised competitions ===
From 2002 to 2011, the Comedy Central-era arena was utilized for BattleBotsIQ (later rebranded to BotsIQ), a series of annual competitions for students using robots built at the 120lb (middleweight) weight class. 15lb robots were added to the tournament series starting in 2005. Several other small tournaments were held at trade shows and private company events during the 2000s. In 2024, BotsIQ was repurposed into BattleBots: Metal Mayhem, a competition between 15lb robots built by high schoolers. The event was sponsored by the US Army and held in Austin as part of the 2024 South by Southwest technology festival.

Between August 21 and 26, 2009, a major BattleBots-branded event was held and filmed in Vallejo, California. Three competitions were held: The High School Championship, Collegiate Championship and Pro Championship. Competitors included a mix of Comedy Central stars and newcomers who would return to the reboot. Though essentially an extension of BotsIQ, it notably saw the return of heavyweight machines and their professional creators. CBS Sports originally agreed to air the Collegiate Championship before dropping out due to lack of commercial interest. A deal with Fox was later signed before also falling apart for unknown reasons. The pilot episode of the Collegiate Championship was released onto the official BattleBots YouTube Channel on the 17th of September 2010.

The rebooted version of BattleBots has hosted several untelevised shows in Las Vegas, featuring the heavyweight machines from the televised series. In 2019 and 2022, minor tournaments were hosted in collaboration with re:MARS, a technology conference run by Amazon. The re:MARS competition on June 6, 2019 was won by Witch Doctor (out of ten competitors), while the competition on June 23, 2022 was won by HyperShock (out of eight competitors).

A live show, 'BattleBots: Destruct-A-Thon', is presented four days a week starting in February 2023, with a brief hiatus in August 2024. 'Destruct-A-Thon' exhibited unscripted fights between replicas of classic and reboot BattleBots heavyweight competitors. The replica bots, or 'ShowBots', were built and driven by a production crew with guidance from the original teams who designed the competitors. Starting May 2023, the production space was utilized for another live show, 'BattleBots Proving Ground', which involved fights between newly designed or untested bots from newcomers or unproven teams. 'Destruct-A-Thon' and 'Proving Ground' are hosted by Steve Judkins and Bil Dwyer, who previously hosted the Comedy Central era of the competition.

== Personalities ==
For the first five seasons, BattleBots was hosted by Bil Dwyer, Sean Salisbury, and Tim Green. Correspondents included former Baywatch actresses Donna D'Errico, Carmen Electra, and Traci Bingham, former Playboy Playmate Heidi Mark, comedian Arj Barker and identical twins Randy and Jason Sklar. Bill Nye was the show's "technical expert". The show's match announcer was longtime boxing ring announcer Mark Beiro.

The 2015 season was hosted by Molly McGrath, with Chris Rose and former UFC fighter Kenny Florian as commentators. The battle arena announcer was Faruq Tauheed, and Alison Haislip conducted interviews on the sidelines and behind the scenes. The judges were engineer and NASA astronaut Leland Melvin, Nerdist News anchor Jessica Chobot and visual effects artist, and former competitor, Fon Davis.

For the 2016 season, Samantha Ponder replaced Molly McGrath as host. The returning judges were Fon Davis, Jessica Chobot, and Leland Melvin, as well as celebrity guest judges actor Clark Gregg, MythBusters host and former Battlebots builder Adam Savage, NFL tightend Vernon Davis, and YouTube star Michael Stevens a.k.a. Vsauce.

For the 2018 season, Rose, Florian, and Tauheed all returned in their roles, with Rose and Florian taking over as the primary hosts of the show. Chobot and Haislip switched their roles, with Chobot becoming the new sideline reporter and Haislip one of the rotating judges. Other judges include former Battlebots competitors Lisa Winter, Derek Young, Grant Imahara and Mark Setrakian.

For the 2019 season, Chobot was replaced with Jenny Taft as a sideline reporter, and the judging panel was fixed to Winter, Young, and former competitor Jason Bardis instead of rotating as it had done in previous seasons.

For the 2020 season, former builder Peter Abrahamson was added as a ringside "bot whisperer" who provided technical details and in-depth analysis of matchups, robots, and damage.

- Jamie Hyneman and Adam Savage (creators of heavyweight Blendo), and Grant Imahara (creator of middleweight Deadblow) of Discovery Channel's MythBusters are former competitors. Deadblow sometimes appeared as a "guest MythBuster", assisting Grant with various experiments including "Driving In The Dark".
- Will Wright, the creator of SimCity and other Sim games, as well as Spore, was a long-time contestant. He competed with middleweight Chiabot in Seasons 1–5, multibot RACC along with Mike Winter in Long Beach 1999, and lightweight The Aggressive Polygon in Season 1. His daughter Cassidy competed with middleweight Misty the WonderBot in Seasons 4–5.
- Michael Loren Mauldin, founder of Lycos, entered multiple bots over the series, competing with Team Toad.
- One of the founders of BattleBots, Trey Roski, is the son of Edward Roski Jr., one of the owners of the STAPLES Center sports arena in Los Angeles.
- Jay Leno appeared with a novelty BattleBot, Chinkilla – a lift-type robot, Chinkilla did not comply with the competition rules and only competed in special exhibition matches at BattleBots events.
- Mark Setrakian, builder/creator of the fighting robots and control suits used on Robot Combat League, is known for his visually appealing robots such as Mechadon and Snake. He has also worked on control technology used for films like Men In Black, The Grinch, and Hellboy. Whilst Setrakian did not compete in the ABC revival series, he built Axis, a claw-like podium that rotated the Giant Nut on top of it while it was on display.
- Gary Coleman, in promotion with UGO.com, joined Jim Smentowski on Team Nightmare for BattleBots Season 5.
- Dan Barry, retired NASA astronaut and Survivor: Panama contestant, competed in BattleBots Season 7 with Black Ice.

== Format ==
=== Weight classes ===
Robots at BattleBots tournaments were separated into four weight classes in seasons 1–5. The weight limits increased slightly over time. At the final tournaments, the classes were:

- Lightweight – 60 pounds (30 kilograms)
- Middleweight – 120 pounds (54 kilograms)
- Heavyweight – 220 pounds (100 kilograms)
- Superheavyweight – 340 pounds (154 kilograms)

Starting in season 6, there were no longer separate weight classes, while the weight limit for heavyweights was increased from 220 to 250 pounds.

"Walking" robots (stompbots) propelled by means other than wheels were initially given a 50% weight bonus. The rules changed following the victory of a heavyweight stompbot (Son of Whyachi) at BattleBots 3.0. For BattleBots 4.0 and beyond only a 20% weight bonus was given to walkers and the technical rules specified that walking mechanisms do not use cam operated walking mechanisms as they were functionally too similar to wheel operation. Since the rules change, walking robots have entered the competition, but none has achieved any success beyond preliminary rounds. As of 2020, true walkers are given a 100% weight bonus, allowing the only competing walker, Chomp, to weigh 500 pounds.

=== Matches ===
Matches are three minutes long. During a match, two robots do their best to destroy or disable each other using whatever means available. The match begins with a series of lights that flash from yellow to green. The original Comedy Central version used a standard Christmas tree as seen in the sport of drag racing; the ABC revival uses just one box of lights that flash yellow three times, and then flash green.

If a robot pins or grabs an opposing robot by any means, the aggressor can hold the defender for up to 30 seconds before needing to release, though they are allowed to attempt another pin/grab after releasing, thereby granting another 30 seconds. Robots that are unable to release their opponent or otherwise become entangled may cause the match to be paused, allowing BattleBots technicians to enter the BattleBox and attempt to separate them. If they are able to be separated, the match restarts with the remaining time on the clock. If unable, the match will be ended prematurely and sent to the judges.

If a robot is unable to move for ten seconds, because it is too badly damaged or it is stuck in some manner (e.g., ensnared in an arena-trap), it is declared knocked out. In the Comedy Central version, the driver could also call a "tap-out" to forfeit the match if his or her robot is about to be destroyed. This ends the match ten seconds later; the opposing driver is "asked" (but not instructed) not to attack during the ten-second count.

If both robots survive the three minutes, or if the match is prematurely halted, a panel of judges distribute a total of 33 points (11 points a judge) over three categories: Damage, Aggression, and Control. Damage is weighted more heavily with five possible points, while Aggression and Control account for three each. Judges are provided with detailed guidelines for scoring, but in general terms, Damage points are awarded for how much non-cosmetic damage is inflicted to both robots either directly by their opponent and/or by arena hazards, Aggression refers to how much each robot engaged or avoided the other, and Control points are awarded based on how skillfully the drivers either evaded their opponents' attacks or positioned their own for maximum effectiveness. The robot with the higher score wins. Starting in Season 7, competitors who disagreed with the judges' decision may file an appeal, prompting a closer look at the fight and potentially overturning the decision. If this appeal fails, that team loses the ability to challenge further rulings that season.

At the end of the tournament, a series of 'rumbles' or 'melee rounds' is typically held in each weight class, allowing robots that survived the main tournament to fight in a 'free for all' in a 5-minute match. Occasionally, there are too many robots for one rumble, and multiple rumbles are held with the top surviving bots competing in a final event. During the Season 5 Heavyweight rumble (the first rumble of that competition), a sheared-off robot part went through the Lexan arena roof and fell (harmlessly) into the audience. Because of this, the rest of the rumbles were canceled due to safety concerns.

=== Arena ===
The BattleBox is a 48 ft × 48 ft (15 m × 15 m) square arena designed to protect the drivers, officials, and audience from flying debris and charging bots. It was originally designed by Pete Lampertson. As of the 2015 season, Pete was still overseeing the box with the help of Matt Neubauer. It has a steel floor and steel-framed walls and roof paneled with thick, bulletproof polycarbonate plastic. The teams bring their robots in through doorways, which are sealed after all humans have exited. The drivers control their machines from outside the sealed arena.

Arena booby-traps are intended to make fights more interesting and unpredictable and to reward drivers who can avoid the traps while pushing or carrying their opponent into them.

=== Prizes ===
Besides the Giant Nut trophy awarded to the winning team of the championship tournament, there are cash prizes for all robots that compete in combat at the tournament. In the second season of the ABC revival series, the winner of the championship tournament finals was awarded a cash prize of US$25,000. During Season 10, the prize was US$10,000.

Additionally, the Giant Bolt trophies are awarded to teams based on their robot's design and operation, regardless of their performance in the tournament. The awarded categories are: Most Destructive Robot, Best Design, and the Founder's Award (which celebrates those that "best represent the spirit and values" of BattleBots). Following the death of longtime competitor Grant Imahara in 2020, the Best Designer award was renamed to the Grant Imahara Award for Best Design in his honor.

== Episodes ==
Season	Episodes	Originally released		
Season	Episodes	First released	Last released	Network
1	15	August 23, 2000	December 5, 2000	Comedy Central
2	19	December 12, 2000	March 6, 2001	Comedy Central
3	20	July 10, 2001	September 11, 2001	Comedy Central
4	20	January 8, 2002	March 12, 2002	Comedy Central
5	20	August 20, 2002	December 21, 2002	Comedy Central
6	6	June 21, 2015	July 26, 2015	ABC
7	10	June 23, 2016	September 1, 2016	ABC
8	20	May 11, 2018	October 5, 2018	Discovery Channel
9	16	June 7, 2019	September 27, 2019	Discovery Channel
10	14	December 3, 2020	March 11, 2021	Discovery Channel
11	14	January 6, 2022	April 7, 2022	Discovery Channel
12	19	January 5, 2023	May 25, 2023	Discovery Channel

== Spin-off series ==
=== BattleBots: Bounty Hunters ===
On December 3, 2020, a spin-off streaming series was announced, titled BattleBots: Bounty Hunters. The streaming series was filmed concurrently with the 2020–2021 season and aired from January 4 to March 18, 2021, on Discovery+.

BattleBots: Bounty Hunters is a six-episode series involving 48 bots in total. Each episode is themed around a "bounty" placed on the heads of six destructive veteran bots: Bronco, Icewave, Tombstone, Beta, Witch Doctor, and Son of Whyachi. In each episode, eight bots (including newcomers) fight through a single-elimination tournament for the chance to fight in a bounty match against the veteran bot in question. Whichever team wins the bounty match earns US$25,000.

=== BattleBots: Champions ===
On July 19, 2022, a second spin-off, titled BattleBots: Champions, was announced. The streaming series aired from August 4 to September 8, 2022, on Discovery+. BattleBots: Champions is a sequel to BattleBots: Bounty Hunters, filmed concurrently with the 2022 season.

BattleBots: Champions is a six-episode series involving 48 bots in total. In each of the first five episodes, eight bots fight through a single-elimination tournament, called the "Sin City Slugfest". Each winner of the Sin City Slugfest then battles a winner of a BattleBots: Bounty Hunters bounty match. The victor progresses to the Golden Bolt tournament. The sixth episode is the Golden Bolt tournament, where the five surviving bots face off against each other and three current or former BattleBots champions (for 2022, Tombstone, End Game, and Tantrum). The overall winner of BattleBots: Champions is awarded the Golden Bolt.

From October 5 to November 9, 2023, a second season of BattleBots: Champions, titled BattleBots II: Sin City aired on Discovery Channel and streamed on MAX. The format was similar to the earlier series, eschewing the bounty match battle and replacing Tombstone with SawBlaze as an automatic Golden Bolt qualifier. It was filmed concurrently with the 2023 BattleBots World Championship VII (season 12).

Currently, End Game is the reigning champion with two consecutive wins.

According to Chris Rose, there is going to be another season of BattleBots: Champions on YouTube, with the filming taking place in Las Vegas in April-May 2026.

=== BattleBots: Pro League ===
On February 6, 2026, BattleBots announced that a new partnership with Bright Data would allow for what would be branded as “the next era of BattleBots.” This new sponsorship deal created BattleBots: Pro League, a 20-episode season premiering worldwide on YouTube, with weekly episodes on Thursdays. Pro League episodes follow a group stage style tournament, with 6 groups (A-F) of four robots each. Each robot in each group must face every other robot in its group (a round-robin format). The robot with the most wins from each group advances to a tournament later in the season.

== Competitors and results ==
=== Comedy Central ===
Comedy Central seasons
Season	Year	Weight class	Number of competitors	Winner	Runner-up	Semi-finalists
1.0	2000	Superheavyweight (325 lb)	15	Minion	DooAll	Rammstein, Ronin
1.0	2000	Heavyweight (210 lb)	20	Vlad the Impaler	Voltarc	Punjar, Killerhurtz
1.0	2000	Middleweight (115 lb)	12	Hazard	Deadblow	Super Orbiting Force, Pressure Drop
1.0	2000	Lightweight (58 lb)	24	Backlash	Alpha Raptor	Das Bot, Mouser Mecha Catbot
2.0	2000–2001	Superheavyweight (325 lb)	26	Diesector	Atomic Wedgie	War Machine, Revision Z
2.0	2000–2001	Heavyweight (210 lb)	33	Biohazard	Vlad the Impaler	FrenZy, Voltronic
2.0	2000–2001	Middleweight (115 lb)	29	Spaz	El Diablo	Bad Attitude, The Master
2.0	2000–2001	Lightweight (58 lb)	40	Ziggo	Backlash	Beta Raptor, Toe Crusher
3.0	2001	Superheavyweight (325 lb)	62	Vladiator	Minion	Diesector, Toro
3.0	2001	Heavyweight (210 lb)	90	Son of Whyachi	Biohazard	Hexadecimator, Overkill
3.0	2001	Middleweight (115 lb)	132	Hazard	Little Drummer Boy	T-Wrex, SABotage
3.0	2001	Lightweight (58 lb)	115	Dr. Inferno Jr.	Gamma Raptor	Sallad, Wedge of Doom
4.0	2002	Superheavyweight (340 lb)	69	Toro	New Cruelty	Little Blue Engine, Diesector
4.0	2002	Heavyweight (220 lb)	71	Biohazard	Overkill	Tazbot, Surgeon General
4.0	2002	Middleweight (120 lb)	106	Hazard	Complete Control	Heavy Metal Noise, Zion
4.0	2002	Lightweight (60 lb)	104	Ziggo	The Big B	Death by Monkeys, Carnage Raptor
5.0	2002	Superheavyweight (340 lb)	92	Diesector	Vladiator	New Cruelty, Maximus
5.0	2002	Heavyweight (220 lb)	101	Biohazard	Voltronic	Aces and Eights, Overkill
5.0	2002	Middleweight (120 lb)	150	T-Minus	SOB	Hazard, Turtle
5.0	2002	Lightweight (60 lb)	156	Dr. Inferno Jr.	Wedge of Doom	Gamma Raptor, Code:BLACK

=== ABC / Discovery Channel ===
ABC / Discovery Channel seasons
Season (overall)	Revival season	Year	Number of competitors	Winner	Runner-up	Semi-finalists (top 4)	Quarter-finalists (top 8)
6	1	2015	24	Bite Force	Tombstone	Ghost Raptor, Bronco	Overhaul, Witch Doctor, Icewave, Stinger
7	2	2016	55	Tombstone	Bombshell	Yeti, Minotaur	Beta, Poison Arrow, Chomp, Bronco
8	3	2018	55	Bite Force	Minotaur	Whiplash, Lock-Jaw	Rotator, Monsoon, Bronco, Bombshell
9	4	2019	68	Bite Force	Witch Doctor	Tombstone, Death Roll	Lock-Jaw, SawBlaze, Whiplash, Minotaur
10	5	2020–2021	59	End Game	Whiplash	Tantrum, Black Dragon	Shatter!, Hydra, SawBlaze, Ribbot
11	6	2022	59	Tantrum	Witch Doctor	Hydra, SawBlaze	Cobalt, Minotaur, Blip, Riptide
12	7 (World Championship VII)	2023	50	SawBlaze	HUGE	Ribbot, Copperhead	Minotaur, Witch Doctor, Hydra, Riptide

=== Other televised competitions ===
Long Beach 1999
Weight class	Number of competitors	Winner	Runner-up	Semi-finalists
"Gigabots" (200 lb)	24	Biohazard	Killerhurtz	Tazbot, Vlad the Impaler
"Megabots" (109 lb)	13	Son of Smashy	Knee Breaker	Deadblow, Carnivore
"Kilobots" (55 lb)	27	Ziggo	Defiant	Toe Crusher, Tentomushi

Las Vegas 1999 pay-per-view
Weight class	Number of competitors	Winner	Runner-up	Semi-finalists
Heavy weight (210)	24	Vlad the Impaler	Voltarc	Rhino, Punjar
Superheavyweight (325 lb)	8	Minion	Ricon	World Peace, Mechadon

BattleBots: Bounty Hunters (2021)
Bounty / Episode	Bounty Match Winner	Bounty Match Loser	Pre-bounty Finalist
Bronco (Episode 1)	Rotator	Bronco	MadCatter
Icewave (Episode 2)	Skorpios	Icewave	Hypershock
Tombstone (Episode 3)	Tombstone	Gruff	Kraken
Beta (Episode 4)	Lock-Jaw	Beta	Bloodsport
Witch Doctor (Episode 5)	Witch Doctor	SubZero	Malice
Son of Whyachi (Episode 6)	Gigabyte	Son of Whyachi	Copperhead

BattleBots: Champions (2022)
Episode	Golden Bolt Qualifier Winner	Golden Bolt Qualifier Loser	Sin City Slugfest Finalist
Gigabyte (Episode 1)	Hypershock	Gigabyte	MadCatter
Lock-Jaw (Episode 2)	Ribbot	Lock-Jaw	Deep Six
Rotator (Episode 3)	Glitch	Rotator	Uppercut
Skorpios (Episode 4)	Skorpios	Bloodsport	Blacksmith
Witch Doctor (Episode 5)	Witch Doctor	Whiplash	Black Dragon
Golden Bolt Tournament Winner	Golden Bolt Tournament Runner-up	Golden Bolt Tournament Semi-finalists	Golden Bolt Tournament Quarter-finalists
End Game	Witch Doctor	Tantrum, Hypershock	Ribbot, Glitch, Tombstone, Skorpios

BattleBots: Champions II (2023)
Episode	Golden Bolt Qualifier	Slugfest Finalist	Slugfest Semi-finalist
Episode 1	SHREDDIT BRO!	Valkyrie	Switchback, Rotator
Episode 2	Whiplash	Black Dragon	Malice, MadCatter
Episode 3	Free Shipping	Gigabyte	Beta, DeathRoll
Episode 4	JackPot	Cobalt	Lucky, Emulsifier
Episode 5	RIPperoni	HyperShock	Monsoon, Claw Viper
Golden Bolt Tournament Winner	Golden Bolt Tournament Runner-up	Golden Bolt Tournament Semi-finalists	Golden Bolt Tournament Quarter-finalists
End Game	SawBlaze	JackPot, Tantrum	Free Shipping, SHREDDIT BRO!, Whiplash, RIPperoni

== See also ==
- Robot Fighting League
- Survival Research Laboratories
- RoboGames
- Robot Wars (TV series)
