= Lisa Winter =

Engineer, roboticist, and television personality

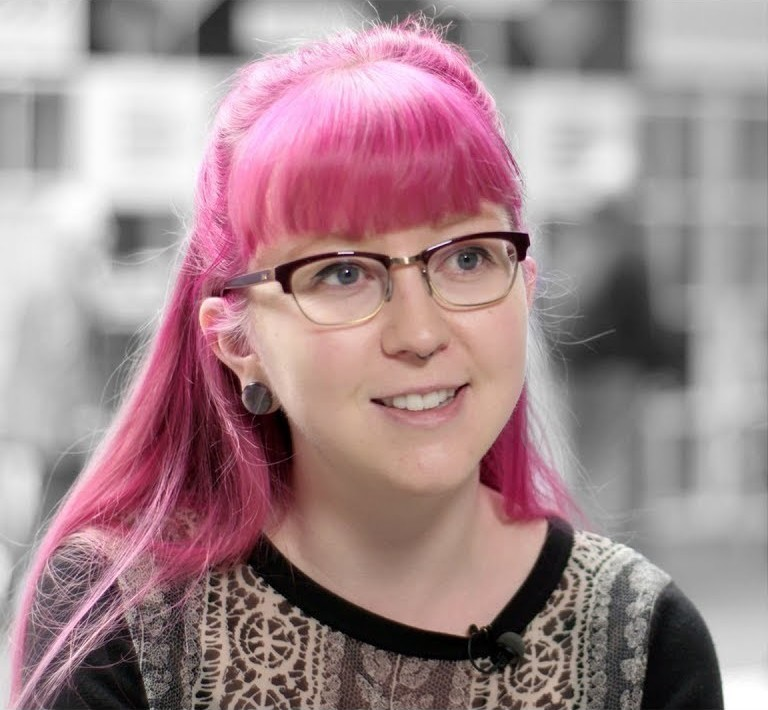
- Winter in 2017
- Born: 1985 or 1986 (age 39–40)
- Education: University of California Santa Cruz (Bachelor of Arts)
- Occupations: Roboticist; Television personality; Engineer
- Known for: BattleBots
- Website: www.lisaxwinter.com

Lisa Winter (born 1985 or 1986) is an American engineer, roboticist, and television personality. She is best known for her work on the television series BattleBots, where she competed with numerous robots and was formerly a judge.

== Early life ==
Growing up in Wisconsin, from an early age Winter expressed an interest in robotics. In 1996, she joined her father in building robots for battle competitions. She attended Miramonte High School, and went on to graduate from the University of California, Santa Cruz (UCSC) with a Bachelor of Arts degree.

== Robot competitions ==
She was a part of the team "Robot Action League".

=== Robot Wars ===
Winter first competed in 1996, when she was 10 years old, at Robot Wars in San Francisco. Her robot was called "Dough Boy", and consisted of an aluminum base and horizontally spinning blades. She eventually became the Robot Wars middleweight world champion.

=== BattleBots ===
Winter has been a part of every season of BattleBots. She competed in seasons 1 through 7, and was a judge for seasons 8 through 12. Her BattleBots include: Tentoumushi, Mr. Squeeky, Plan X, and Mega Tento.

In 2000, Winter and fellow competitor Christian Carlberg appeared on The Tonight Show with Jay Leno to demonstrate their robots and perform a mini fight.

== Career ==
After graduating from UCSC, she worked part time for her father's robotics company before being hired by an industrial design company. She cofounded Robot11, a smart toy company, in 2011. In 2013, she designed a social wearable device for Kwame Corp. As of 2020 she is the Engineering Project Manager at Mattel.

== Personal life ==
Winter is on the board of directors for Women In Robotics. She also volunteers her time to make "hat tags" for The Marine Mammal Center in Marin, California. She is a vegan.
