= Chris Rose =

American sportscaster (born 1971)

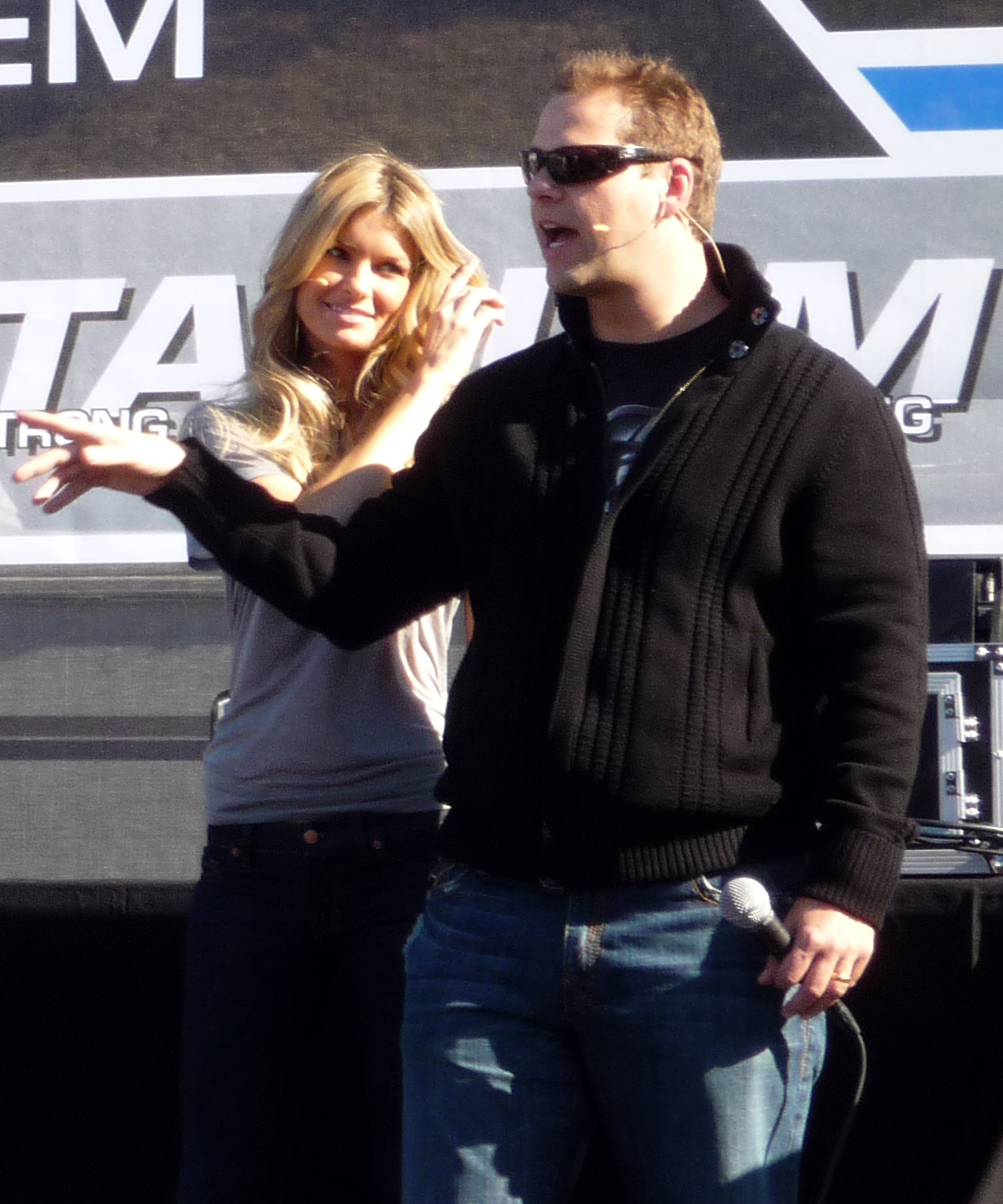
- Rose with Marisa Miller in December 2008
- Born: Christopher Rose; January 27, 1971 (age 55); Shaker Heights, Ohio, U.S.
- Education: Miami University (B.A.)
- Occupations: Sports journalist/TV/radio announcer and commentator
- Title: NFL studio host, NFL Network anchor, baseball commentator, football commentator

Christopher Rose (born January 27, 1971) is an American sportscaster for the NFL Network, and the preseason television play-by-play announcer for the Cleveland Browns of the National Football League (NFL). Outside of football, he is also a commentator for the Discovery Channel series BattleBots and podcast host for Jomboy Media.

== Early life and career ==
Rose, who was born and raised in Shaker Heights, Ohio, an eastside Cleveland suburb, attended University School in Hunting Valley, Ohio during high school and spent his childhood summers at North Star Camp. Rose attended Miami University in Oxford, Ohio and graduated in 1993. He served as station manager at the student-run radio station, WMSR. He is a lifelong fan of all three of Cleveland's major sports franchises (Guardians, Cavaliers, and Browns - for which he provides play by play during locally televised preseason games on WEWS-TV 5).

Rose currently resides in California with his wife Michelle and has two sons: Brady and Josh.

== Broadcasting career ==
=== The Best Damn Sports Show Period ===
Rose is known as one of the hosts of The Best Damn Sports Show Period, on Fox Sports Net, which aired from 2001-2009. Except for a brief period in 2004 and 2005, Rose hosted the show from its inception until it went off the air. Rose has also hosted the poker show Million Dollar Challenge.

=== Fox Sports ===
In 2007, Rose became a play-by-play announcer for Fox's coverage of the NFL. In 2006, he did Gamebreaks for the NFL coverage while Joe Buck and Curt Menefee hosted the studio coverage from the game site. He was the studio host for Fox's BCS coverage.

In 2007, he was the #7 play-by-play announcer for Fox's coverage of the NFL. A year later, he was demoted to #8 play-by-play but promoted again to #7 in 2009. Rose was again the #7 play-by-play announcer in 2010. On Sunday, November 8, 2009, Rose did Gamebreaks for the NFL on Fox while the Fox NFL Sunday crew did the pregame show from Bagram Airfield in Afghanistan. Trent Green and John Lynch were among the analysts who worked with Rose. In 2004, Rose was a fight announcer and narrator on the reality sports series The Next Great Champ. In addition, Rose was a ringside commentator for Golden Boy Boxing in 2012 airing on Fuel TV.

Rose took over the revamped Fox Saturday Baseball pre game show in 2009. Rose was also the host for the World Series pre-game show. He presented the World Series trophies from 2009 to 2011. He called select games as well as field reporting for MLB on FOX. He also hosted Big Shots: Titans at the Tee. During the 2010 Major League Baseball season he hosted the inaugural season of The Cheap Seats. David Cone took over the show following the 2010 season. On March 21, 2012, it was announced Matt Vasgersian would become the new pre-game host and Rose would no longer be working with the network.

Rose has been criticized for appearing to be too friendly with players he has interviewed during Fox's baseball coverage. For example, during the 2009 World Series, Rose referred to Derek Jeter of the New York Yankees as "Jeets". One year later during the World Series, Rose referred to both Brian Wilson and Tim Lincecum of the San Francisco Giants as "his friends."

=== MLB Network ===
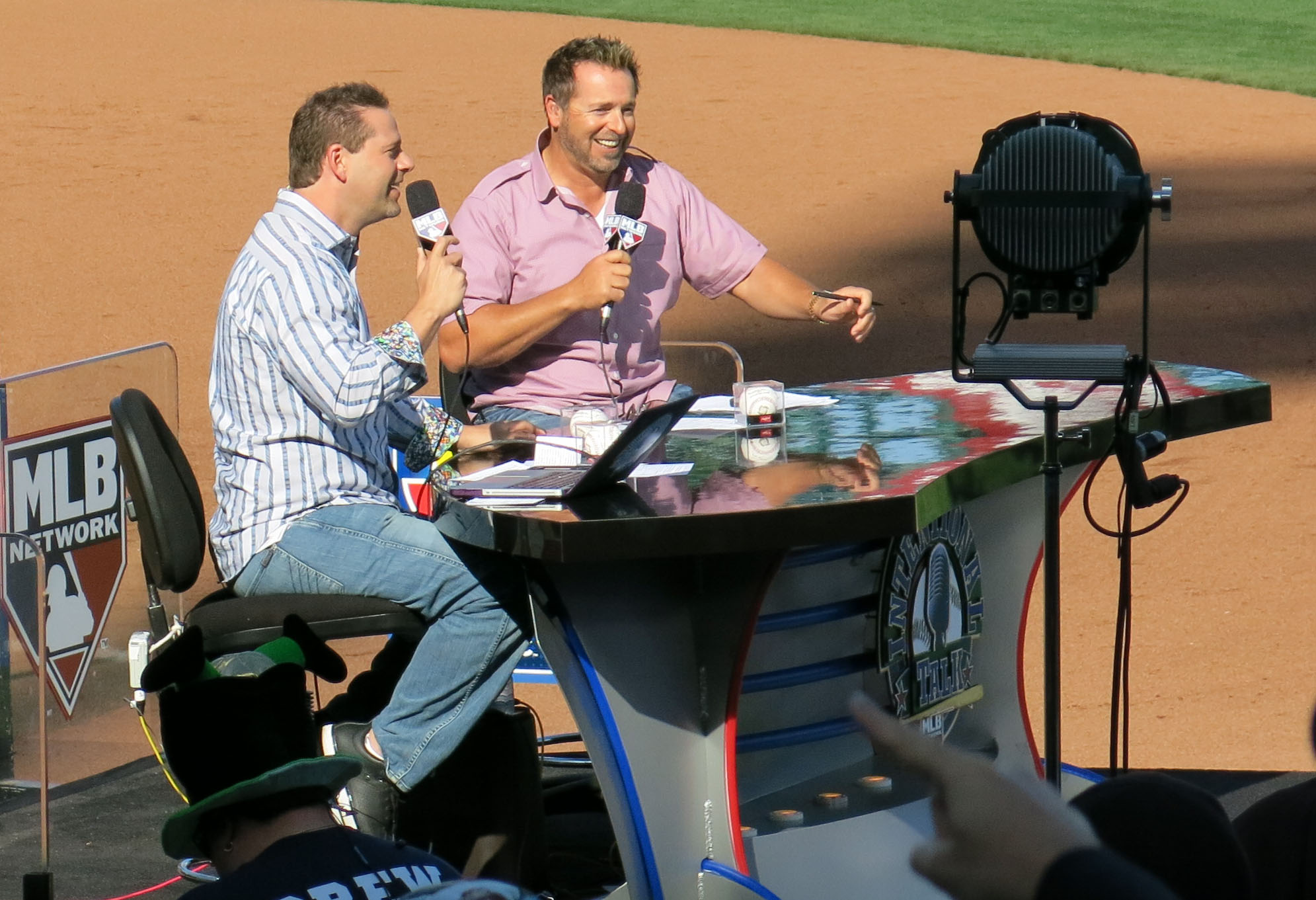
Chris Rose and Kevin Millar film a segment of Intentional Talk at the 2013 World Baseball Classic semifinal game 1 at AT&T Park in San Francisco, California, USA.

Rose was hired by MLB Network in April 2010. A year later, he began co-hosting Intentional Talk with Kevin Millar. Intentional Talk has become one of the most popular shows on MLB Network. On December 11, 2020, Rose announced that MLB Network was not picking up his contract and his last Intentional Talk show would take place on December 23, 2020.

=== NFL Network ===
On August 28, 2012, NFL Network announced they had added Rose to their team. He currently is a studio host for the channel. Rose is the host of NFL GameDay Highlights, NFL GameDay Final, as well as the postgame edition of NFL Total Access following the network's Thursday Night Football coverage. Rose continued to host Intentional Talk for MLB Network, even though that network's studios were in New Jersey while the NFL Network's were in Los Angeles.

=== Cleveland Browns ===
Since 2022, Rose has served as the play-by-play announcer for preseason telecasts of the Cleveland Browns on WEWS-TV 5 in Cleveland. Following the 2023 Browns season opener, longtime radio play-by-play announcer Jim Donovan went on medical leave to undergo treatment for leukemia, and Rose was named as Donovan's substitute. Rose would continue to serve as the Browns' radio announcer for the rest of the season; Andrew Siciliano would take over the permanent radio play-by-play announcer from 2024 onwards.

=== BattleBots ===
In 2015, Rose became a play-by-play announcer for ABC's revival of the robot combat series BattleBots, joined by UFC commentator Kenny Florian. Rose continued his role on the revival's third season, which moved to Science Channel.

=== PokerStars Big Game ===
In 2010, Rose co-hosted season 1 of the PokerStars Big Game with Joe Stapleton. Rose was replaced by Scott Huff in season 2, so Rose could focus on MLB broadcasting full-time.

=== Jomboy Media ===
On February 18, 2021, Rose announced he would be joining Jomboy Media with a podcast titled "The Chris Rose Rotation". This show will feature various MLB players as co-hosts for the 2021 season. The first episode of "The Chris Rose Rotation" premiered on March 1, 2021. The final episode of the show was released on March 10, 2025. Rose also hosts a daily baseball show with former MLB player Trevor Plouffe entitled “Baseball Today”.

In August 2022, Rose started hosting a national football podcast on Jomboy Media called “The Chris Rose Football Show” with Jets Tight End C. J. Uzomah. The show was rebranded as “Football Today” in August 2023 with Bobby Skinner & Justin Penik.

In March of 2025, Rose began hosting a new show titled “Dugout Discussions with Chris Rose”

In additions to hosting podcasts, Rose also provides play by play for various events in the Jomboy Media Warehouse including Blitzball, Floorball, and Ball in Play.

== Filmography ==
- Garfield: The Movie (on September 15, 2017, Rose said his foot was in the "Garfield" movie)
- Mr. 3000
- Rebound
- Glory Road
- The Comebacks
