= Dorchester, Wisconsin =

- Village
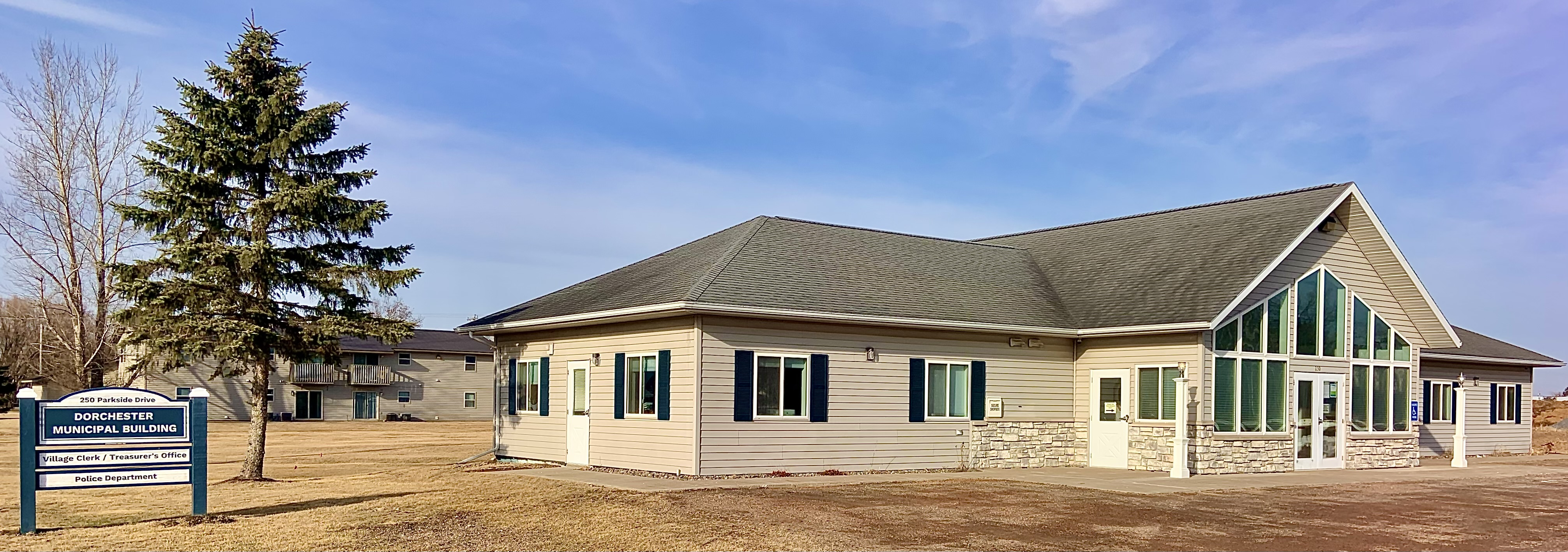
- Village hall

- Location of Dorchester in Clark County and Marathon County, Wisconsin.
- Coordinates: 45°0′8″N 90°19′55″W
- Country: United States
- State: Wisconsin
- Counties: Clark, Marathon

Area
  - Total: 1.43 sq mi (3.70 km^{2})
  - Land: 1.39 sq mi (3.61 km^{2})
  - Water: 0.035 sq mi (0.09 km^{2})
- Elevation: 1,427 ft (435 m)

Population (2020)
  - Total: 849
  - Density: 609/sq mi (235/km^{2})
- Time zone: UTC-6 (Central (CST))
  - Summer (DST): UTC-5 (CDT)
- Area codes: 715 & 534
- FIPS code: 55-20450
- GNIS feature ID: 1564058
- Website: www.dorchesterwi.com

Dorchester is a village in Clark and Marathon counties in the U.S. state of Wisconsin, along the 45th parallel. It is part of the Wausau, Wisconsin Metropolitan Statistical Area. The population was 849 at the 2020 census. Of this, 846 were in Clark County, and only 3 were in Marathon County.

== Geography ==
Dorchester is located at 45°0′8″N 90°19′55″W (45.002233, -90.331995).

According to the United States Census Bureau, the village has a total area of 1.42 square miles (3.68 km^{2}), of which 1.39 square miles (3.60 km^{2}) is land and 0.03 square miles (0.08 km^{2}) is water. Most of the village lies in Clark County, with only a small portion in Marathon County.

== Demographics ==
Historical population
Census	Pop.	Note	%±
1880	244		—
1890	350		43.4%
1910	476		—
1920	519		9.0%
1930	400		−22.9%
1940	456		14.0%
1950	457		0.2%
1960	504		10.3%
1970	491		−2.6%
1980	613		24.8%
1990	697		13.7%
2000	827		18.7%
2010	876		5.9%
2020	849		−3.1%
U.S. Decennial Census

=== 2010 census ===
As of the census of 2010, there were 876 people, 355 households, and 228 families living in the village. The population density was 630.2 inhabitants per square mile (243.3/km^{2}). There were 383 housing units at an average density of 275.5 per square mile (106.4/km^{2}). The racial makeup of the village was 90.3% White, 0.6% African American, 0.2% Native American, 0.1% Asian, 8.3% from other races, and 0.5% from two or more races. Hispanic or Latino of any race were 12.8% of the population.

There were 355 households, of which 33.2% had children under the age of 18 living with them, 48.5% were married couples living together, 8.2% had a female householder with no husband present, 7.6% had a male householder with no wife present, and 35.8% were non-families. 28.2% of all households were made up of individuals, and 11.3% had someone living alone who was 65 years of age or older. The average household size was 2.47 and the average family size was 2.99.

The median age in the village was 34.5 years. 26.3% of residents were under the age of 18; 8% were between the ages of 18 and 24; 28.4% were from 25 to 44; 21.9% were from 45 to 64; and 15.3% were 65 years of age or older. The gender makeup of the village was 51.4% male and 48.6% female.

=== 2000 census ===
As of the census of 2000, there were 827 people, 336 households, and 220 families living in the village. The population density was 631.7 people per square mile (243.7/km^{2}). There were 354 housing units at an average density of 270.4 per square mile (104.3/km^{2}). The racial makeup of the village was 96.98% White, 0.24% Native American, 1.93% from other races, and 0.85% from two or more races. Hispanic or Latino of any race were 2.30% of the population.

There were 336 households, out of which 32.7% had children under the age of 18 living with them, 53.9% were married couples living together, 8.0% had a female householder with no husband present, and 34.5% were non-families. 27.1% of all households were made up of individuals, and 13.7% had someone living alone who was 65 years of age or older. The average household size was 2.46 and the average family size was 3.01.

In the village, the population was spread out, with 26.5% under the age of 18, 9.1% from 18 to 24, 31.3% from 25 to 44, 15.7% from 45 to 64, and 17.4% who were 65 years of age or older. The median age was 35 years. For every 100 females, there were 97.8 males. For every 100 females age 18 and over, there were 93.6 males.

The median income for a household in the village was $34,750, and the median income for a family was $44,063. Males had a median income of $28,242 versus $23,958 for females. The per capita income for the village was $15,860. About 7.1% of families and 10.1% of the population were below the poverty line, including 12.4% of those under age 18 and 12.4% of those age 65 or over.

== Notable people ==
- Ervin Kleffman, composer
- Herman L. Kronschnabl, Wisconsin State Representative

== Gallery ==
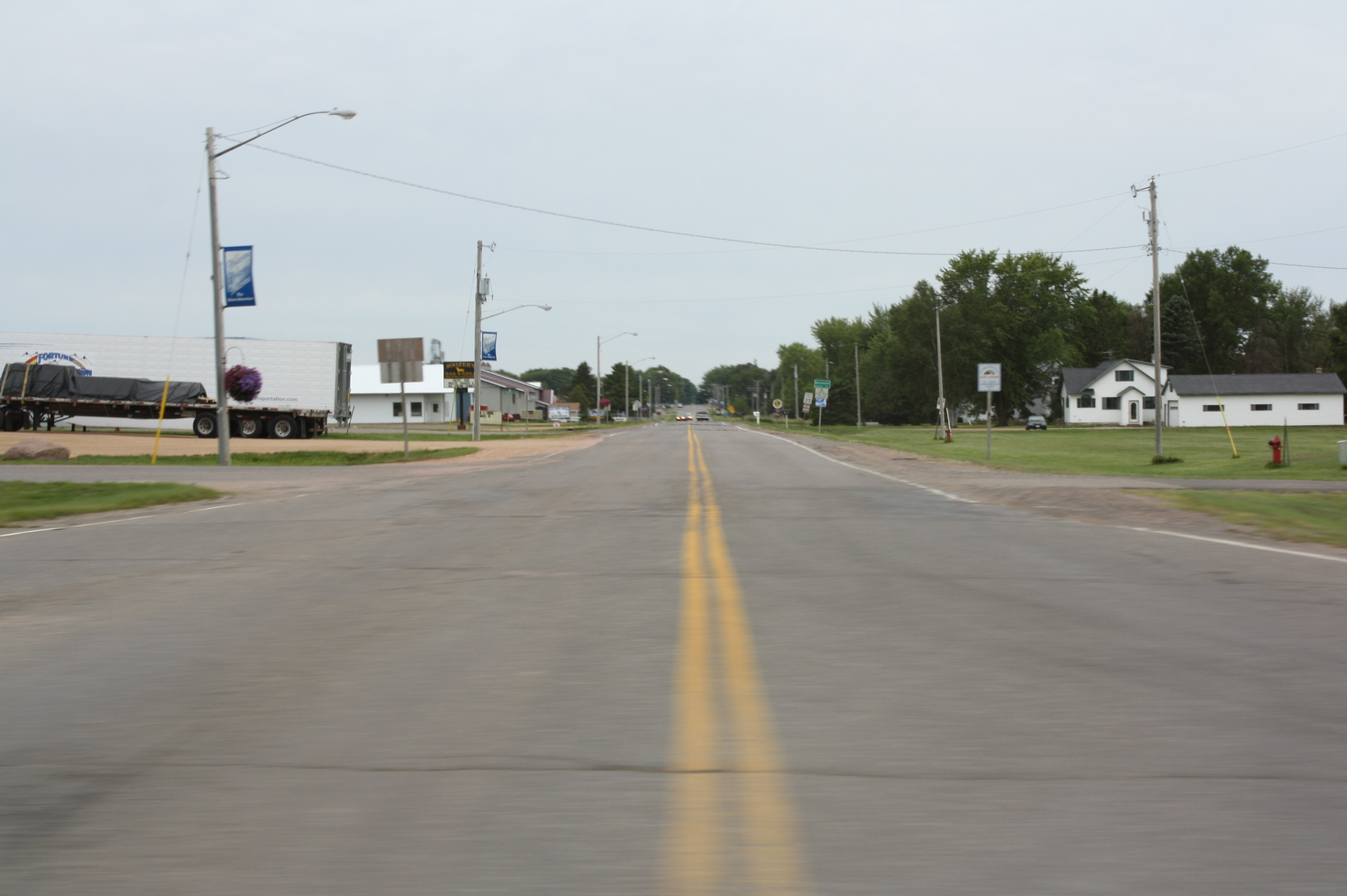
Looking west in Dorchester

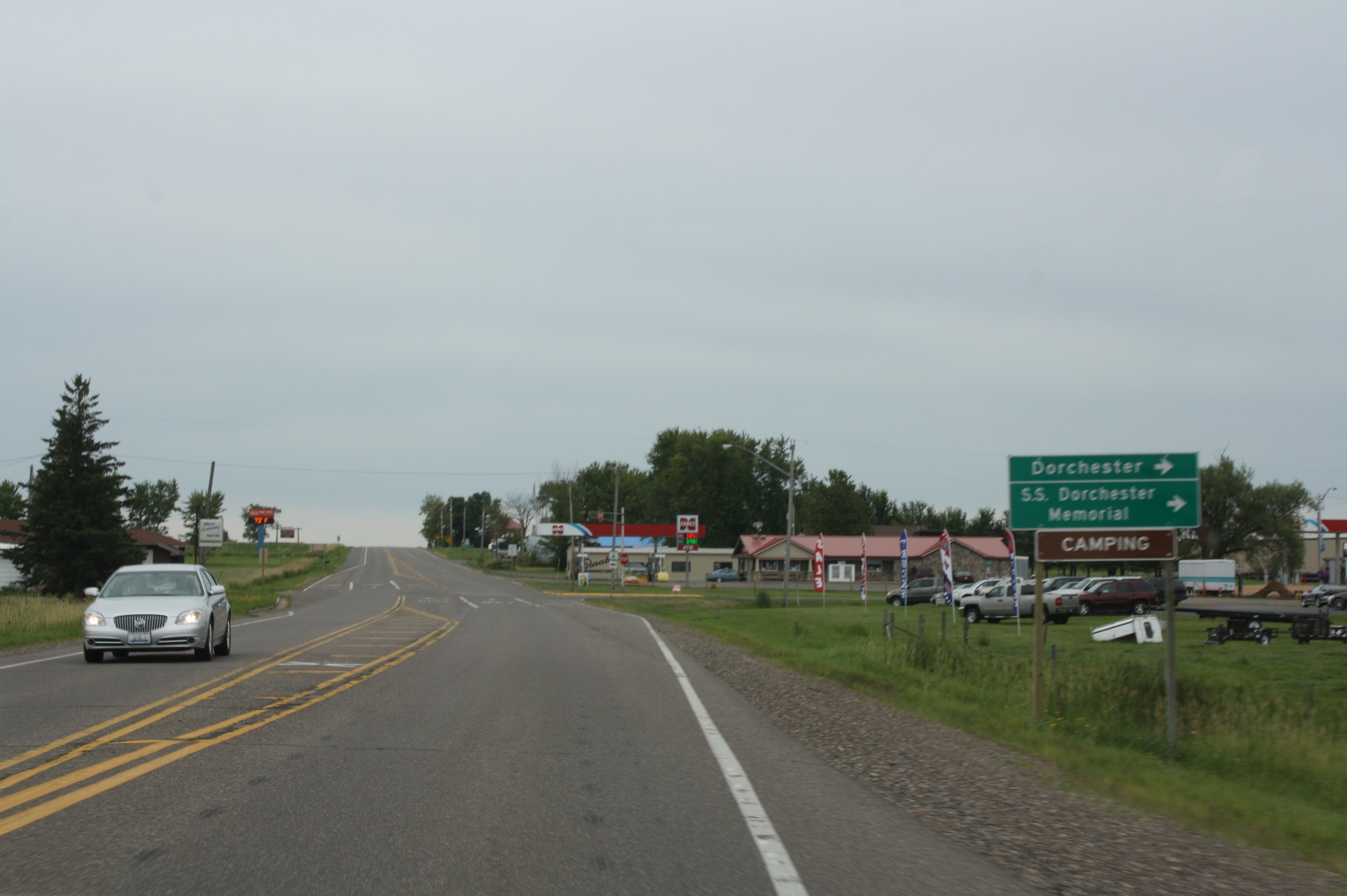
Looking south at Dorchester
